= Mongolostegus =

Mongolostegus Temporal range: Early Cretaceous, Aptian–Albian
- Skeletal reconstruction as an early-diverging stegosaur

Scientific classification
- Kingdom: Animalia
- Phylum: Chordata
- Class: Reptilia
- Clade: Dinosauria
- Clade: †Ornithischia
- Clade: †Thyreophora
- Clade: †Stegosauria
- Genus: †Mongolostegus; Tumanova and Alifanov, 2018

Type species
- †Mongolostegus exspectabilis Tumanova and Alifanov, 2018

Synonyms
- Wuerhosaurus "mongoliensis" Ulansky, 2014

Genus of stegosaurian dinosaurs

Mongolostegus (meaning "Mongolian roof") is an extinct genus of stegosaurian dinosaurs from the Early Cretaceous (Aptian–Albian ages) Dzunbain Formation of Mongolia. The genus contains a single species, Mongolostegus exspectabilis, known from a fragmentary single specimen representing the first stegosaur named from Mongolia. It is one of the youngest known stegosaurs, along with Yanbeilong and an unnamed species from the Hekou Group of China. In contrast to these taxa, which are members of the late-diverging stegosaur subfamily Stegosaurinae, Mongolostegus may have affinities to more basal taxa such as the Huayangosauridae.

== Discovery and description ==
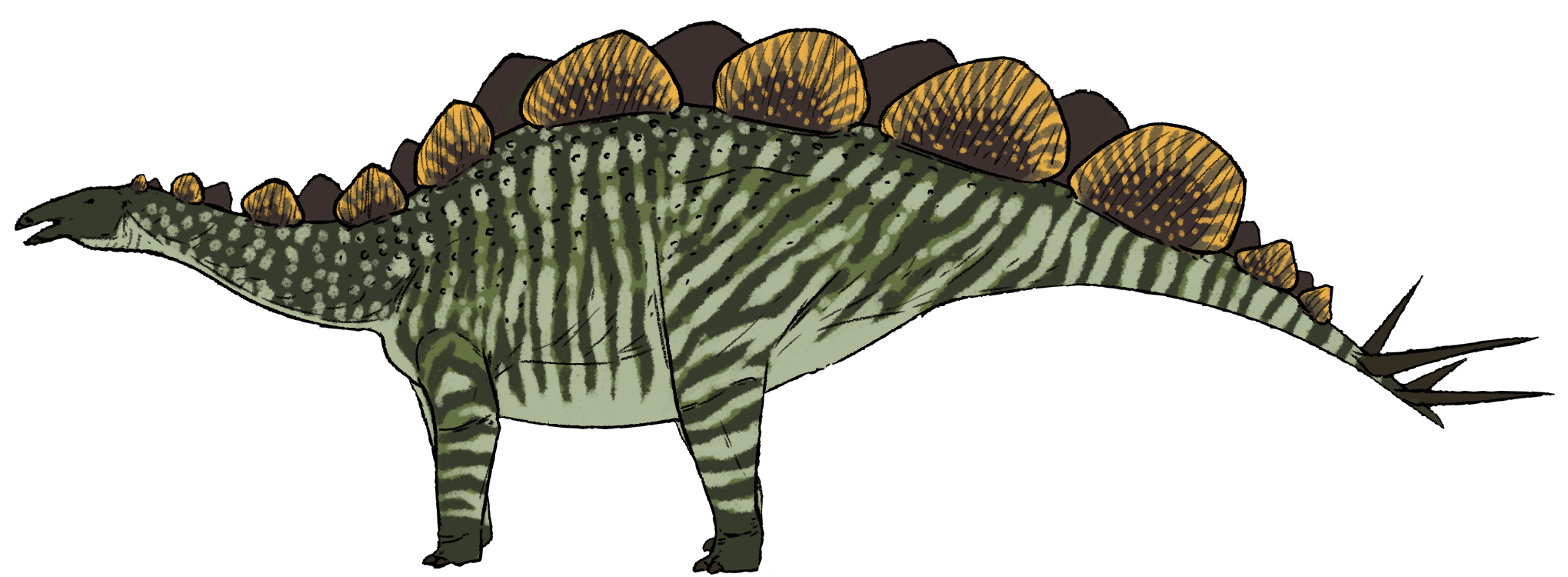
Speculative life restoration as a stegosaurid

The Mongolostegus holotype specimen, PIN 3779-15 was discovered in 1981 by a joint expedition between Soviet and Mongolian researchers. The specimen, recovered from a layer of the Dzunbain Formation at Chamrin-Us, Mongolia, comprises a single caudosacral vertebra articulated with the first five caudal vertebrae, a sacral rib, the left pubis and part of the right pubis, and various pelvic bone fragments.

Mongolostegus was first reported by Alifanov et al. (2005) and Alifanov (2012) as an indeterminate stegosaur. In 2014, Ulansky informally dubbed the material Wuerhosaurus "mongoliensis", but Galton and Carpenter (2016) noted the invalid status of this name as a nomen nudum.

In 2018, Tumanova and Alifanov formally described Mongolostegus exspectabilis as a new genus and species of stegosaurs based on these remains. The generic name, Mongolostegus, combines a reference to the discovery of the specimen in Mongolia with the Greek stege, meaning "roof". The specific name, exspectabilis, is derived from a Latin word meaning "expected for a long time". Mongolostegus is the first and only stegosaur named from this country.

Dating to the end of the Early Cretaceous, Mongolostegus is notably one of the few known Cretaceous stegosaurs and one of the youngest (most recent) known members of this clade in the fossil record. Yanbeilong from the Zuoyun Formation and an unnamed species from the Hekou Group, both from China, date to similar ages.

== Classification ==
In their 2018 description of Mongolostegus, Tumanova and Alifanov (2018) described this taxon as a member of the Stegosauridae without further discussion. The first research to include Mongolostegus was published in 2025 by Sánchez-Fenollosa & Cobos in a revision of stegosaur phylogeny and nomenclature. The authors noted that the very fragmentary nature of the species' holotype reduced the resolution of their results, requiring them to remove it for optimal clarity. When included, Mongolostegus was recovered in a polytomy with the most early-diverging (basal) stegosaurs, including Huayangosaurus, Gigantspinosaurus, and Bashanosaurus, all known from the Middle–Late Jurassic. This position is supported by anatomical features of the tail vertebrate (the lack of dorsal processes on the transverse processes and unexpanded apices of the neural spines) and pubis (postpubis dorsal edge lacking a distinct kink). As such, the authors interpreted Mongolostegus as a late-surviving member of either the Huayangosauridae or early-diverging Stegosauridae. These results are displayed in the cladogram below:

- Stegosauria
  - Bashanosaurus
  - Baiyinosaurus
  - Chungkingosaurus
  - Gigantspinosaurus
  - Huayangosaurus
  - Isaberrysaura
  - Mongolostegus
  - Stegosauridae
    - - Tuojiangosaurus
      - Paranthodon
    - Neostegosauria
      - Dacentrurinae
        ⊞
        - Alcovasaurus
        - - Kentrosaurus
          - - Thyreosaurus
            - - Adratiklit
              - Dacentrurus
                (including Miragaia)
        ⊟
      - Stegosaurinae
        ⊞
        - - - Qigu Formation stegosaur
            - Loricatosaurus
          - - Hesperosaurus
            - Stegosaurus stenops
        - - Jiangjunosaurus
          - - Hekou Group stegosaur
            - - Wuerhosaurus homheni
              - Yanbeilong
        ⊟

== See also ==
- Timeline of stegosaur research
