= Bashanosaurus =

Bashanosaurus Temporal range: Middle Jurassic (Bathonian), 166 ± 1.5 Ma
- Skeletal reconstruction

Scientific classification
- Kingdom: Animalia
- Phylum: Chordata
- Class: Reptilia
- Clade: Dinosauria
- Clade: †Ornithischia
- Clade: †Thyreophora
- Clade: †Stegosauria
- Family: †Huayangosauridae
- Genus: †Bashanosaurus; Dai et al., 2022

Type species
- †Bashanosaurus primitivus Dai et al., 2022

Extinct genus of stegosaurian dinosaur

Bashanosaurus (meaning "Bashan lizard") is an extinct genus of stegosaurian dinosaur from the Middle Jurassic (Bathonian age) Shaximiao Formation of Yunyang County, China. The genus contains a single species, Bashanosaurus primitivus, known from incomplete skeletons belonging to three individuals. It is one of the basalmost stegosaurs, as well as one of the oldest known stegosaurs, along with Adratiklit, Isaberrysaura, and Thyreosaurus.

== Discovery and naming ==
Bashanosaurus type locality in Yunyang County, China

In 2016, a quarry of dinosaur fossils representing outcrops of the lower Shaximiao Formation was found in Laojun Village of Pu'an Township in Yunyang County, Chongqing Municipality, China. The Bashanosaurus fossil material was among the bones found in the outcrops, consisting of three specimens collected from the same horizon.

The holotype specimen, CLGPR V00006-1, includes one dorsal and two caudal vertebrae, the right scapulocoracoid, a partial left hindlimb (femur, tibia, fibula, and a metatarsal), several fragmentary ribs, and three dermal armor pieces (two plates and one spine). A second specimen was referred, CLGPR V00006-2, consisting of five dorsal vertebrae, the right tibia and fibula, partial ribs, and an incomplete dermal plate. The third specimen, CLGPR V00006-3, is represented by a single dorsal vertebra.

In 2022, Hui Dai and colleagues described Bashanosaurus primitivus as a new genus and species of basal stegosaurian based on these fossil remains. The generic name, "'Bashanosaurus", combines "Bashan"—the ancient name of Chongqing, where the fossils were discovered—with the Greek "sauros", meaning "lizard". The specific name, "primitivus", references the fact that Bashanosaurus is among the earliest diverging stegosaurians.

Dai et al. (2022) also described a fourth stegosaurian specimen, CLGPR V00006-4, found in stratigraphic layers about 900 metres (3,000 ft) away and 50 metres (160 ft) above those of the Bashanosaurus locality. It includes a partial cranium (the frontals, parietals, and a braincase), a dorsal vertebra, and a small broken dermal spine. While similarities were noted between the dorsal vertebrae of this specimen and those referred to Bashanosaurus, it was not referred to this genus as it does not share unique traits with the holotype.

Bashanosaurus is notable for a stegosaur because of its early age, having been found in rocks dating to the Bathonian age (maximum age of 166.0±1.5 Ma) of the Middle Jurassic epoch. This makes it the oldest named stegosaur known from Asia. Few other stegosaurians approach it in age. Isaberrysaura, an Argentinian stegosaur originally described in 2017 as a basal ornithopod within the Neornithischia, may date to the earlier Bajocian age. The Bathonian–Callovian-aged El Mers II Formation of Morocco has also yielded the remains of the early stegosaurs Adratiklit and Thyreosaurus, described in 2020 and 2024, respectively.

The high diversity of stegosaurs found in the Middle Jurassic rocks of China suggests that this clade may have originated in Asia before dispersing throughout Africa and South America, and eventually Europe and North America.

== Description ==
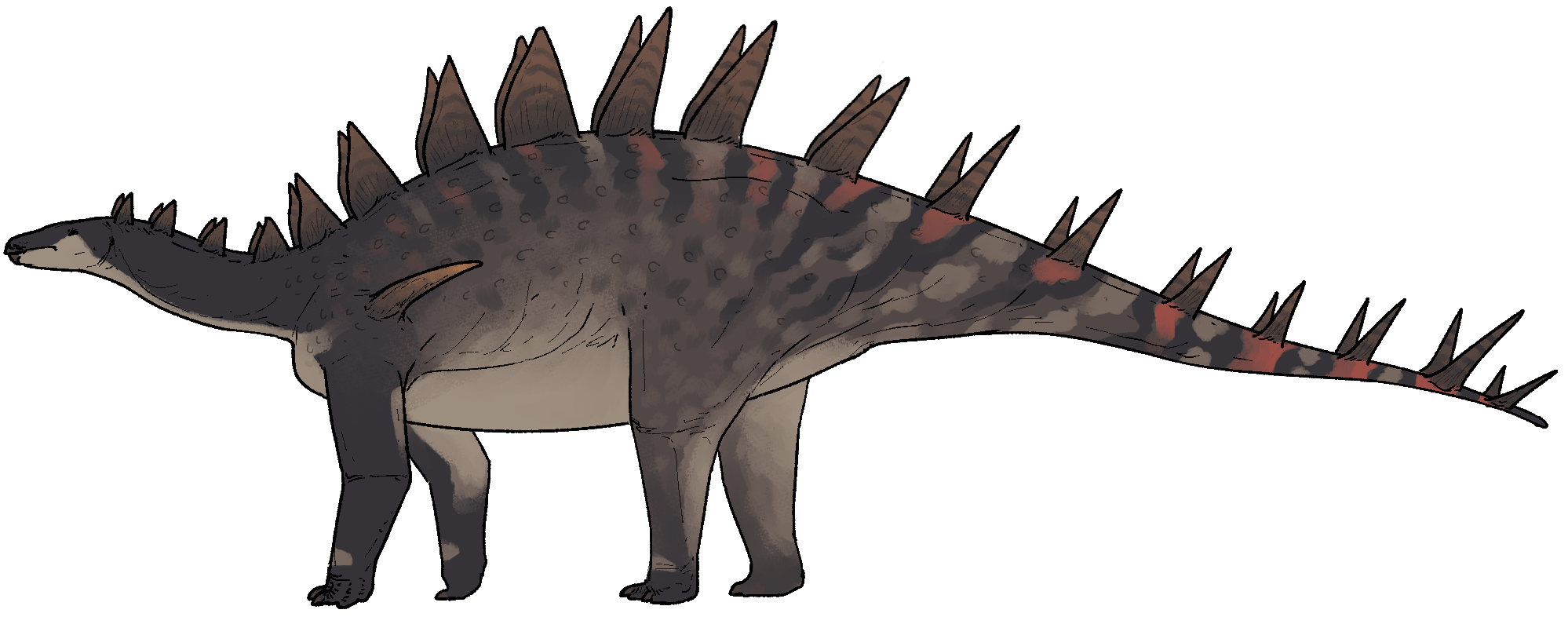
Life restoration

As a stegosaur, Bashanosaurus would have been a quadrupedal herbivore with a paired row of a combination of large plates and spines running along the top of the animal from the neck to the tail tip. These armor pieces—especially those on the end of the tail—could have served as defensive structures against predators.

While the Bashanosaurus fossil material generally resembles stegosaurs in morphology, several features are also reminiscent of the basal thyreophoran Scelidosaurus, indicating that Bashanosaurus had both plesiomorphic (ancestral) thyreophoran traits as well as derived stegosaurian traits.

=== Size ===
Size of Bashanosaurus compared to a human

Bashanosaurus seems to have been a small stegosaur. Based on the proportions of Huayangosaurus, Dai et al. (2022) estimate that Bashanosaurus may have been about 3 metres (9.8 ft) long. However, it is unclear if the fossil specimens belonged to fully grown animals, so it may have been able to grow larger. In comparison, the closely related Chungkingosaurus was moderately-sized, with specimens ranging from around 4–5 metres (13–16 ft) in length. Huayangosaurus was similar in size, around 4 metres (13 ft) in length and 500 kilograms (1,100 lb) in body mass.

=== Ontogenetic stage ===
The fossil material of Bashanosaurus demonstrates a unique blend of features typically seen in both adult and immature animals. For example, in adult Stegosaurus specimens, the scapula and coracoid, as well as the tibia and fibula, are fused together. However, in Bashanosaurus, the scapula and coracoid are fused, but the tibia and fibula are not. Furthermore, the anterior and greater trochanters of the femur are fused in Bashanosaurus. In the femora of Stegosaurus specimens, this fusion is only seen in adult individuals.

=== Skeleton ===
A small portion of the skeleton of Bashanosaurus is known from three different specimens, including vertebrae from the back and tail, ribs, bones from the shoulder and hind limbs, and osteoderms.

In total, seven dorsal vertebrae are known from Bashanosaurus. One of these, CLGPR V00006-3, is nearly complete, missing only the tip of the neural spine. The centrum of this bone is amphiplatyan, meaning that it is flat on both ends. This contrasts with its close relative Chungkingosaurus, where one side of the centrum is curves outward strongly. Like most stegosaurs, the centrum length, width, and height are all similar (except for Dacentrurus, where the width is greater than the length). The vertebral centra of the basal stegosaur Gigantspinosaurus have large fossae (depressions), but these are not seen in Bashanosaurus. Like many early stegosaurs, the neural arch pedicle is not dorsally expanded; an expanded pedicle is common in later-diverging taxa in this clade. The parapophyses are more greatly elevated than in other stegosaurs, similar to the Scelidosaurus, an early thyreophoran.

Two partial caudal vertebrae are known from Bashanosaurus, both from the holotype specimen. These have clear facets for chevrons to articulate with, indicating that these vertebrae are not from the posterior end of the tail. The prezygapophyses significantly hang over the anterior end of the centrum. In the contemporary Huayangosaurus, they only over hang slightly.

Many ribs are associated with the holotype and one of the referred specimens but have not been described in depth.

The Bashanosaurus holotype includes a well-preserved right scapulocoracoid, missing part of the distal end of the scapula and the dorsal edge of the coracoid. The acromial process of the scapula is unusual, being poorly developed. In the majority of stegosaurs, this process is prominent and rectangular. However, in Bashanosaurus, it is small and triangular—more similar to the non-stegosaurian Scelidosaurus than its closer relatives. The blade of the scapula is generally slender, but with a notable flared expansion at the base. In other stegosaurs, the blade is deeper, without this distal expansion. Like in Huayangosaurus, there is no coracoid foramen.

Several hindlimb bones have been assigned to Bashanosaurus. These include the left femur, tibia, fibula, and a metatarsal of the holotype, and a referred right tibia and fibula. The femur is poorly preserved, and only observable in posterior view. The fourth trochanter of the femur is incomplete, but visible as a ridge with a distinct process. It is unique in being positioned below the middle of the shaft of the femur, rather than at the midpoint, as in other stegosaurs. In some stegosaurs, like Dacentrurus, Kentrosaurus, and Stegosaurus, the fourth trochanter is absent or only poorly developed. The distal end of the femur is divided into two epicondyles by a deep groove. The tibiae and fibulae are generally similar in morphology to other stegosaurs. The cnemial crest of the tibia is visible as a sharp ridge. The left metatarsal III is well-preserved, with strongly expanded ends.

=== Osteoderms ===
Illustration of osteoderms known from Bashanosaurus: a single spine (A) and three plates (B–D)

Four incomplete osteodermss are known from Bashanosaurus, consisting of one spine and three plates. The spine is tall and thin. It is unknown where the spine would have been located in life; spines at the end of the tail—forming a structure called a thagomizer—are common in stegosaurians, with some taxa also bearing a parascapular spine near the shoulder. The plates appear broadly rectangular. The plate bases are thickened, with a groove separating the base from the anterior and posterior plate margins. This dermal plate morphology is considered to be an autapomorphy of Bashanosaurus.

== Classification ==
In the phylogenetic analyses in their 2022 description of Bashanosaurus, Dai and colleagues recovered it in the basalmost clade within the Stegosauria, as the sister taxon to the Late Jurassic Chungkingosaurus. Later publications built upon this phylogenetic dataset and found very similar results to the original description; in their 2024 description of the Early Cretaceous stegosaur Yanbeilong, Jia and colleagues recovered the results displayed in Topology A below. Using an updated matrix, Sánchez-Fenollosa and Cobos (2025) recovered Bashanosaurus as a member of a larger Huayangosauridae clade, as the sister taxon to Huayangosaurus. These results are displayed in Topology B below:

Topology A: Jia et al. (2024)

- Stegosauria
  - - Bashanosaurus
    - Chungkingosaurus
  - - Huayangosaurus
    - Stegosauridae
      - - Isaberrysaura
        - Gigantspinosaurus
      - - Alcovasaurus
        - - Jiangjunosaurus
          - - - Tuojiangosaurus
              - Paranthodon
            - - Kentrosaurus
              - - Dacentrurinae
                  | ⊞ | Adratiklit; Dacentrurus | ⊟ |
                - Stegosaurinae
                  ⊞
                  - - Hesperosaurus
                    - Miragaia
                  - - Loricatosaurus
                    - - Yanbeilong
                      - - Wuerhosaurus
                        - Stegosaurus stenops
                  ⊟

Topology B: Sánchez-Fenollosa & Cobos (2025)

- Stegosauria
  - Huayangosauridae
    - Isaberrysaura
    - - - Bashanosaurus
        - Huayangosaurus
      - - Baiyinosaurus
        - Gigantspinosaurus
  - Stegosauridae
    - Chungkingosaurus
    - - - Tuojiangosaurus
        - Paranthodon
      - Neostegosauria
        - Dacentrurinae
          ⊞
          - Alcovasaurus
          - - Kentrosaurus
            - - Thyreosaurus
              - - Adratiklit
                - Dacentrurus
                  (including Miragaia)
          ⊟
        - Stegosaurinae
          ⊞
          - - - Qigu Formation stegosaur
              - Loricatosaurus
            - - Hesperosaurus
              - Stegosaurus stenops
          - - Jiangjunosaurus
            - - Hekou Group stegosaur
              - - Wuerhosaurus homheni
                - Yanbeilong
          ⊟

== Paleoecology ==
=== Palaeoenvironment ===
Using analyses of sedimentology and elemental geochemistry, the Shaximao Formation has been interpreted as representing a semi-arid to semi-humid region with meandering rivers and an intricate seasonal lake system. During the wet, flooding season, the lake level was high, surrounded by a small alluvial plain. During the drier season, there would have been small ephemeral lakes throughout a much larger alluvial plain.

=== Contemporary fauna ===
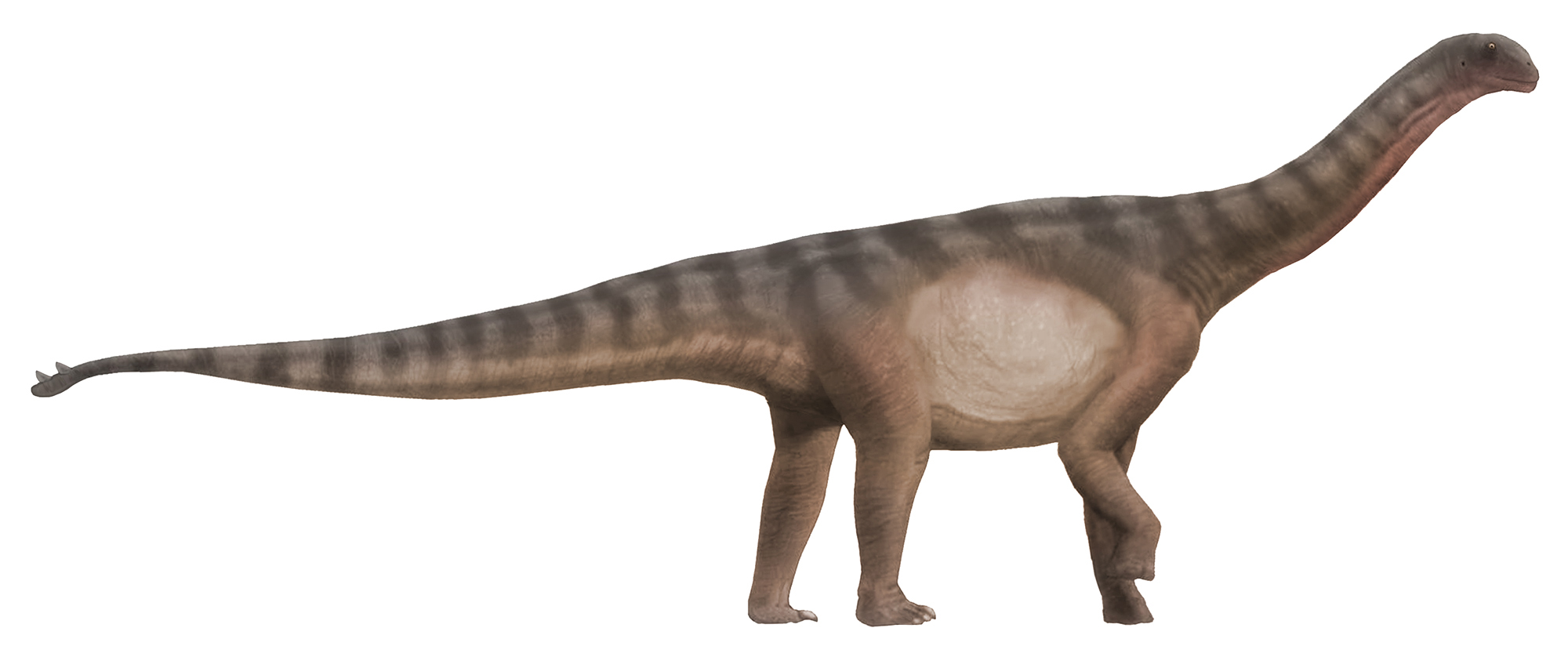
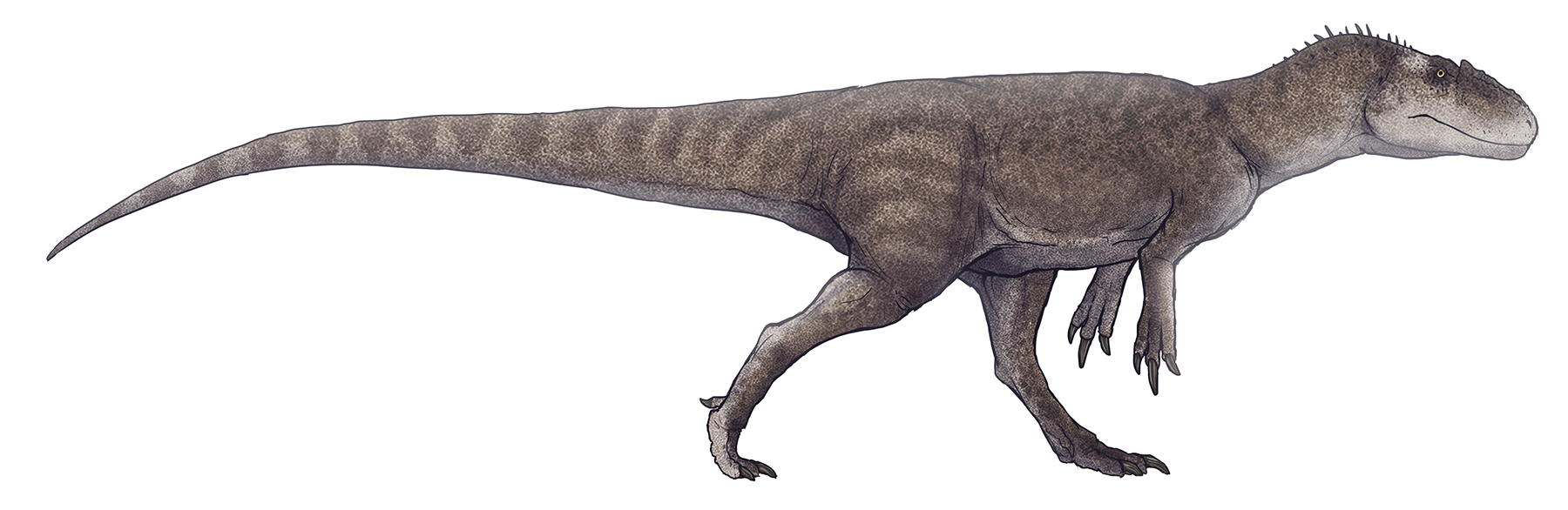
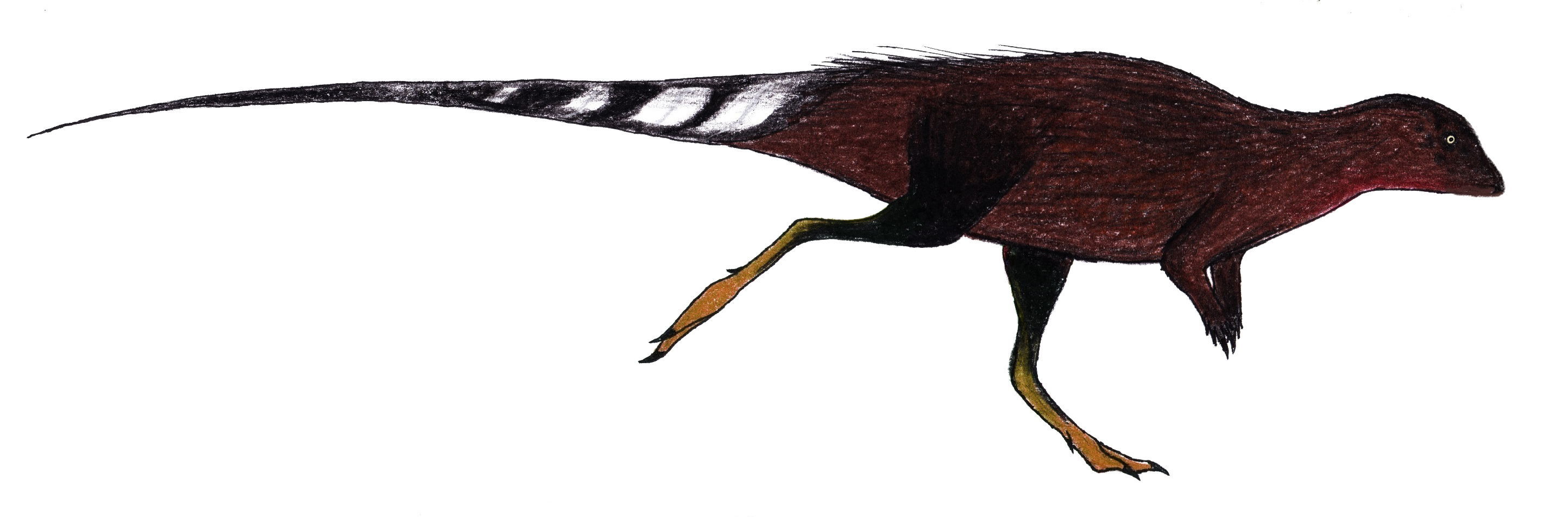
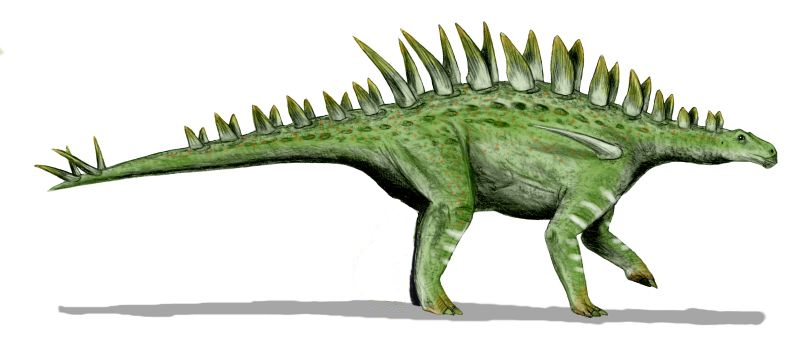
Life restorations of various dinosaurs known from the Lower Member of the Shaximiao Formation. In clockwise order from the top left: Shunosaurus, Gasosaurus, Huayangosaurus, and Hexinlusaurus

The Bashanosaurus fossil material was discovered in the "Dinosaur Fossil Wall" locality of the Shaximiao Formation (Lower Member) of Yunyang County, China, which dates to the Bathonian age of the middle Jurassic period, ~166 million years ago. Several other dinosaur fossils, predominantly belonging to sauropods, have also been found in this bonebed, including Omeisaurus puxiani (a mamenchisaurid), Shunosaurus (a basal eusauropod), and Yuzhoulong (a basal macronarian).

Many other fossil taxa have been found in other localities of the lower Shaximiao Formation, so they may not have been exactly contemporaneous with Bashanosaurus. The dinosaurs discovered include the fellow stegosaurian Huayangosaurus, sauropods (Abrosaurus, Bashunosaurus, Dashanpusaurus, Datousaurus, Omeisaurus spp., and Protognathosaurus), theropods (Chuandongocoelurus, Gasosaurus, Kaijiangosaurus, Szechuanosaurus, Xuanhanosaurus, and an indeterminate megalosaurid), and neornithischians (Agilisaurus, Hexinlusaurus, and Xiaosaurus). The non-dinosaurian fauna includes pterosaurs (Angustinaripterus), turtles (Chengyuchelys spp., Plesiochelys, and Trionyx), crocodyliforms (Teleosaurus, Sunosuchus, and Hsisosuchus), pliosaurid plesiosaurs, therapsids (Bienotheroides and Polistodon), fish (Hybodus, Yuchoulepis, Lepidotes, and Ceratodus), and amphibians (Sinobrachyops).

The upper layers of the formation, which date to younger ages, have also yielded a similar dinosaur fauna, including several stegosaurs (Chialingosaurus, Chungkingosaurus, Gigantspinosaurus, Tuojiangosaurus, and Yingshanosaurus) and various sauropods, theropods, basal ornithischians.

== See also ==
- Adratiklit
- Isaberrysaura
- Huayangosaurus
- Timeline of stegosaur research
- 2022 in archosaur paleontology
