= Yanbeilong =

Yanbeilong Temporal range: Early Cretaceous, Albian
- Skeletal reconstruction

Scientific classification
- Domain: Eukaryota
- Kingdom: Animalia
- Phylum: Chordata
- Clade: Dinosauria
- Clade: †Ornithischia
- Clade: †Thyreophora
- Clade: †Stegosauria
- Family: †Stegosauridae
- Subfamily: †Stegosaurinae
- Genus: †Yanbeilong; Jia et al., 2024
- Species: †Y. ultimus

Binomial name
- †Yanbeilong ultimus Jia et al., 2024

Genus of stegosaurian dinosaurs

Yanbeilong (meaning "north of Yanmen Pass dragon") is an extinct genus of stegosaurian dinosaurs from the Early Cretaceous (Albian age) Zuoyun Formation of Shanxi, China. The genus contains a single species, Yanbeilong ultimus, known from a single partial skeleton including several vertebrae and the pelvic girdle. It is one of the youngest known stegosaurs, alongside Mongolostegus from Mongolia and unnamed stegosaurine remains from the Hekou Group of China, both of which date to the Aptian–Albian ages.

== Discovery and naming ==
Map of China with Zuoyun County indicated (near the Yanbeilong type locality)

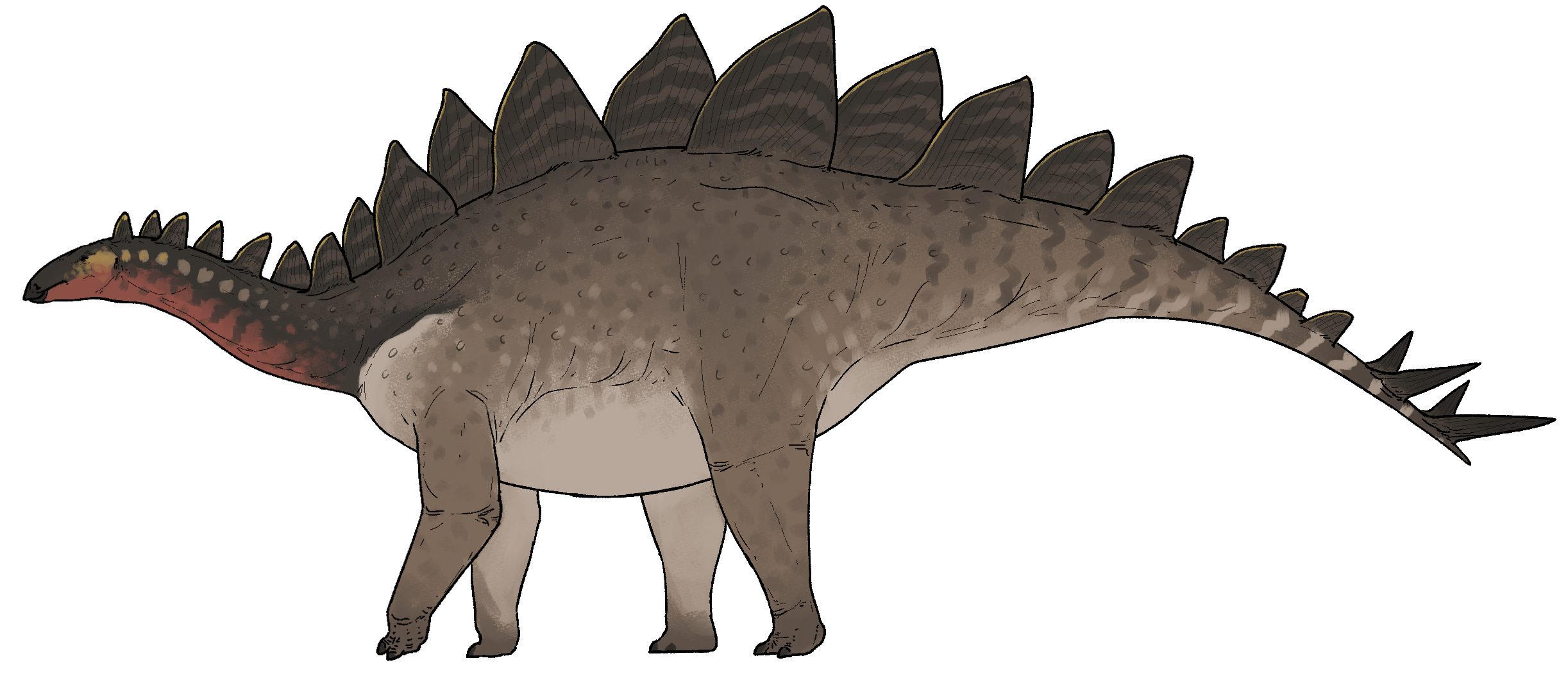
Speculative life restoration

The Yanbeilong holotype specimen, SXMG V 00006, was discovered in 2011 in sediments of the Zuoyun Formation near Madaotou Township in Zuoyun County of Datong City, Shanxi Province, China. The specimen consists of the sacrum, both ilia, the left ischium, right pubis, seven dorsal vertebrae (two of which were isolated, the other five found in association with the ilio-sacral block), and a caudal vertebra.

In 2024, Lei Jia and colleagues described Yanbeilong ultimus as a new genus and species of stegosaur based on these fossil remains. The generic name, "Yanbeilong", combines the Chinese "Yanbei", meaning "North of Yanmen Pass"—referencing the general area of the type locality—and "long", meaning "dragon". The specific name, "ultimus", is a Latin word meaning "last", referencing the fact that this taxon represents a late-surviving member of the stegosaur lineage.

== Classification ==
In their phylogenetic analyses, Jia et al. (2024) recovered Yanbeilong as a deeply-nested member of the Stegosauria, as the sister taxon to a clade containing Stegosaurus stenops and Wuerhosaurus. An updated and more comprehensive analysis published the following year recovered similar results, with Yanbeilong as the sister taxon to Wuerhosaurus, in a Chinese clade within the Stegosaurinae also containing Jiangjunosaurus and an unnamed taxon from the Hekou Group. These results are shown in the cladogram below:

- Stegosauria
  - Huayangosauridae
    ⊞
    - Isaberrysaura
    - - - Bashanosaurus
        - Huayangosaurus
      - - Baiyinosaurus
        - Gigantspinosaurus
    ⊟
  - Stegosauridae
    - Chungkingosaurus
    - - - Tuojiangosaurus
        - Paranthodon
      - Neostegosauria
        - Dacentrurinae
          ⊞
          - Alcovasaurus
          - - Kentrosaurus
            - - Thyreosaurus
              - - Adratiklit
                - Dacentrurus
                  (including Miragaia)
          ⊟
        - Stegosaurinae
          - - - Qigu Formation stegosaur
              - Loricatosaurus
            - - Hesperosaurus
              - Stegosaurus stenops
          - - Jiangjunosaurus
            - - Hekou Group stegosaur
              - - Wuerhosaurus homheni
                - Yanbeilong
