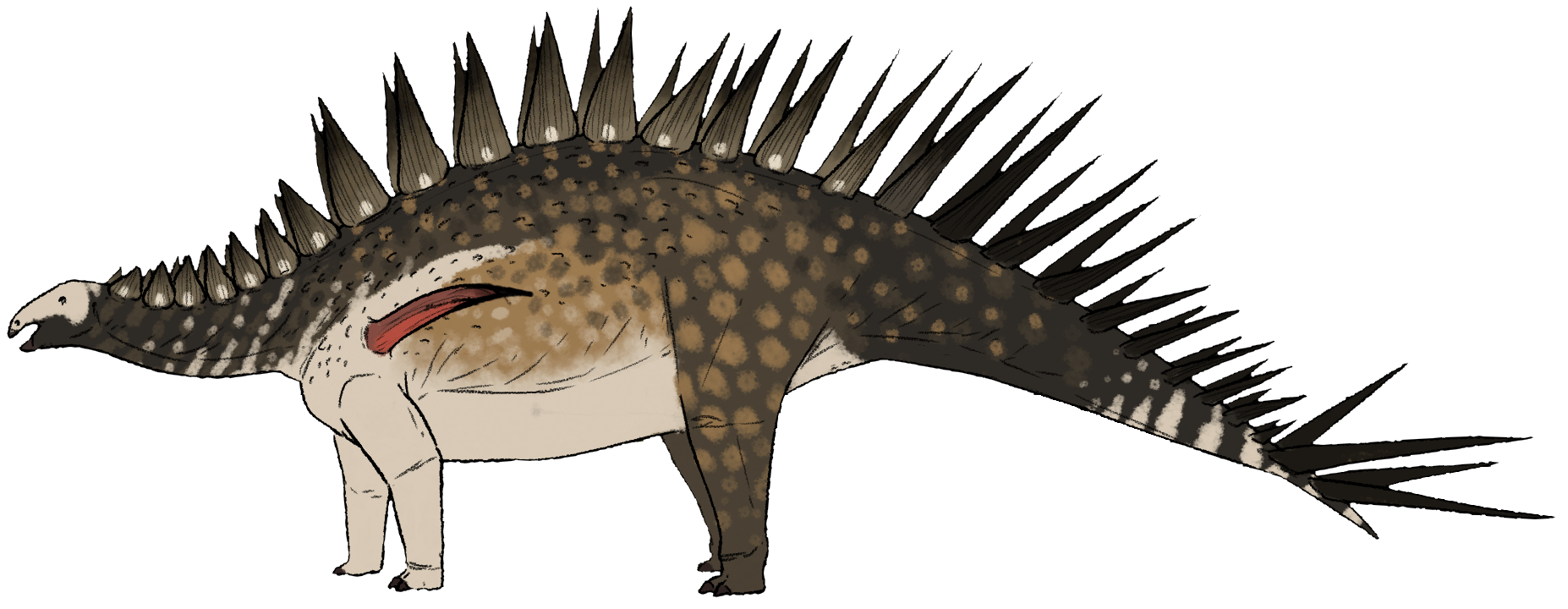
- Life restoration

Scientific classification
- Kingdom: Animalia
- Phylum: Chordata
- Class: Reptilia
- Clade: Dinosauria
- Clade: †Ornithischia
- Clade: †Thyreophora
- Clade: †Stegosauria
- Family: †Stegosauridae
- Subfamily: †Stegosaurinae
- Genus: †Jiangjunosaurus
- Species: †J. junggarensis

Binomial name
- †Jiangjunosaurus junggarensis Jia et al., 2007

= Jiangjunosaurus =

Jiangjunosaurus Temporal range: Late Jurassic, 160 Ma

Extinct genus of dinosaurs

Jiangjunosaurus is an extinct genus of herbivorous stegosaurian dinosaurs from the Oxfordian-age (Upper Jurassic) Shishugou Formation of the Junggar Basin, Xinjiang, China.

== Discovery and naming ==
In 2002, Liu Yongfei discovered the remains of a stegosaurian. These were secured by a Sino-American expedition and prepared by Xiang Lishi and Ding Xiaoqing.

The type species, Jiangjunosaurus junggarensis, was named and described by Jia Chengkai, Catherine Foster, Xu Xing and James Clark in 2007. The generic name refers to the abandoned town of Jiangjunmiao. Jiangjun, 將 軍, is "general" in Chinese and the town's name, the "temple of the general", has been explained by the burial of one. The specific name refers to the provenance from the Junggar.

The holotype, IVPP V 14724, was found in a layer of the Shishugou Formation, dating from the Oxfordian. It includes the lower jaws, some rear skull bones, eleven neck vertebrae, ribs, a scapula, a coracoid, and two neck plates. These elements were found in almost perfect articulation. It represents a subadult individual.

== Description ==
Jiangjunosaurus was a medium-sized stegosaur, reaching 6–7 metres (20–23 ft) in length and 2.5 metric tons (2.8 short tons) in body mass. The describers established three distinguishing traits: the crowns of the teeth are symmetrical and in side view wider than tall; the spine of the axis, the second neck vertebra, has a rectangular profile in side view, instead of a triangular one; and the rear neck vertebrae have large vein openings in their sides.

The skull of Jiangjunosaurus is relatively elongated, the maximum width above the postorbitals probably measuring 35% of the skull length. There are at least fourteen teeth in the maxilla. The quadratojugal has a robust horizontal front branch and a thin short vertical branch, only half as tall as the quadrate shaft. There is no clear foramen paraquadraticum, opening between the quadrate and quadratojugal. The quadrate is inclined to the rear and has a depression on its flange contacting the pterygoid. There is no clear opening between the front branches of the pterygoids.

The predentary, the bone core of the lower beak placed on the fronts of both lower jaws, has a deep and hooked "chin". Between the predentary and the tooth row a gap is present equal to about four tooth positions. From the rear part of a bone shelf at the outside of the tooth row a vertical plate extends upwards obscuring that row in side view. The plate continues to the rear into a high coronoid process. Between dentary, surangular and angular a rather tall triangular mandibular fenestra is present. The dentary bears twenty-one teeth, which are slightly larger than those of the upper jaws. All teeth of Jiangjunosaurus are symmetrical with a triangular profile. Front and rear edges have both seven denticles. In side view the teeth are broad, about as wide as tall. Both their inner and outer sides are convexly curved from the front to the rear. The usual vertical ridges are present but weakly developed; the frontmost and rearmost teeth lack them completely. Primary vertical ridges in the middle are absent.

Of the neck vertebrae the second, the axis, has a neural spine or processus spinosus that is rectangular in side view, due to a higher than normal front edge. It is elongated and rather low. From the fifth cervical vertebra onwards large depressions appear on the lower rear side of the vertebral body. These are pierced by large openings that become progressively wider further back in the series. These foramina are superficially very similar to the pneumatic openings with Saurischia. However, CAT-scans of the Jiangjunosaurus fossils revealed that the openings are not connected to inner air spaces and thus probably served as vein channels. Some dorsal ribs have a crescent-shaped flange at their lower ends. Two neck plates have been preserved, probably in their original position. One is positioned above the axis, the other above the third cervical. The plates are roughly circular or diamond-shaped in form. They are slightly taller than wide in side view, have an obtuse triangular top and a constricted base. The bases are transversely thicker than the top sections, which show a pattern of fine diverging ridges. The plates are positioned to the right of the neural spines and the describers assumed two rows were originally present.

== Phylogeny ==
Jiangjunosaurus was placed in the Stegosauridae in 2007. The describers concluded that within the Stegosauridae it had a basal position. This was not based on an exact cladistic analysis but on the method of comparative anatomy. Jiangjunosaurus shows a mix of basal and derived traits. Characters that are typically stegosaurid are the inclined quadrate; the vertical plate on the dentary; the depression on the pterygoid flange of the quadrate; the bottom edge of the scapula exceeding the upper edge of the coracoid in length; and the double row of larger neck plates. A basal stegosaurid position is suggested by the horizontal front branch of the quadratojugal combined with a ventral process on the main body.

Subsequent research using phylogenetic analyses recovered Jiangjunosaurus in various positions within the Stegosauridae. A 2025 publication by Sánchez-Fenollosa & Cobos included Jiangjunosaurus in a phylogenetic analysis and recovered it as a member of a clade of Chinese stegosaurines including Wuerhosaurus and Yanbeilong. This was partially based on the similarity of its neck vertebrae with those of an unnamed species from the Hekou Group. These results are displayed in the cladogram below:

- Stegosauria
  - Huayangosauridae
    ⊞
    - Isaberrysaura
    - - - Bashanosaurus
        - Huayangosaurus
      - - Baiyinosaurus
        - Gigantspinosaurus
    ⊟
  - Stegosauridae
    - Chungkingosaurus
    - - - Tuojiangosaurus
        - Paranthodon
      - Neostegosauria
        - Dacentrurinae
          ⊞
          - Alcovasaurus
          - - Kentrosaurus
            - - Thyreosaurus
              - - Adratiklit
                - Dacentrurus
                  (including Miragaia)
          ⊟
        - Stegosaurinae
          - - - Qigu Formation stegosaur
              - Loricatosaurus
            - - Hesperosaurus
              - Stegosaurus stenops
          - - Jiangjunosaurus
            - - Hekou Group stegosaur
              - - Wuerhosaurus homheni
                - Yanbeilong

== Paleobiology ==
Jiangjunosaurus may have been a prey item for the metriacanthosaurid theropod Sinraptor.

== See also ==
- Timeline of stegosaur research
