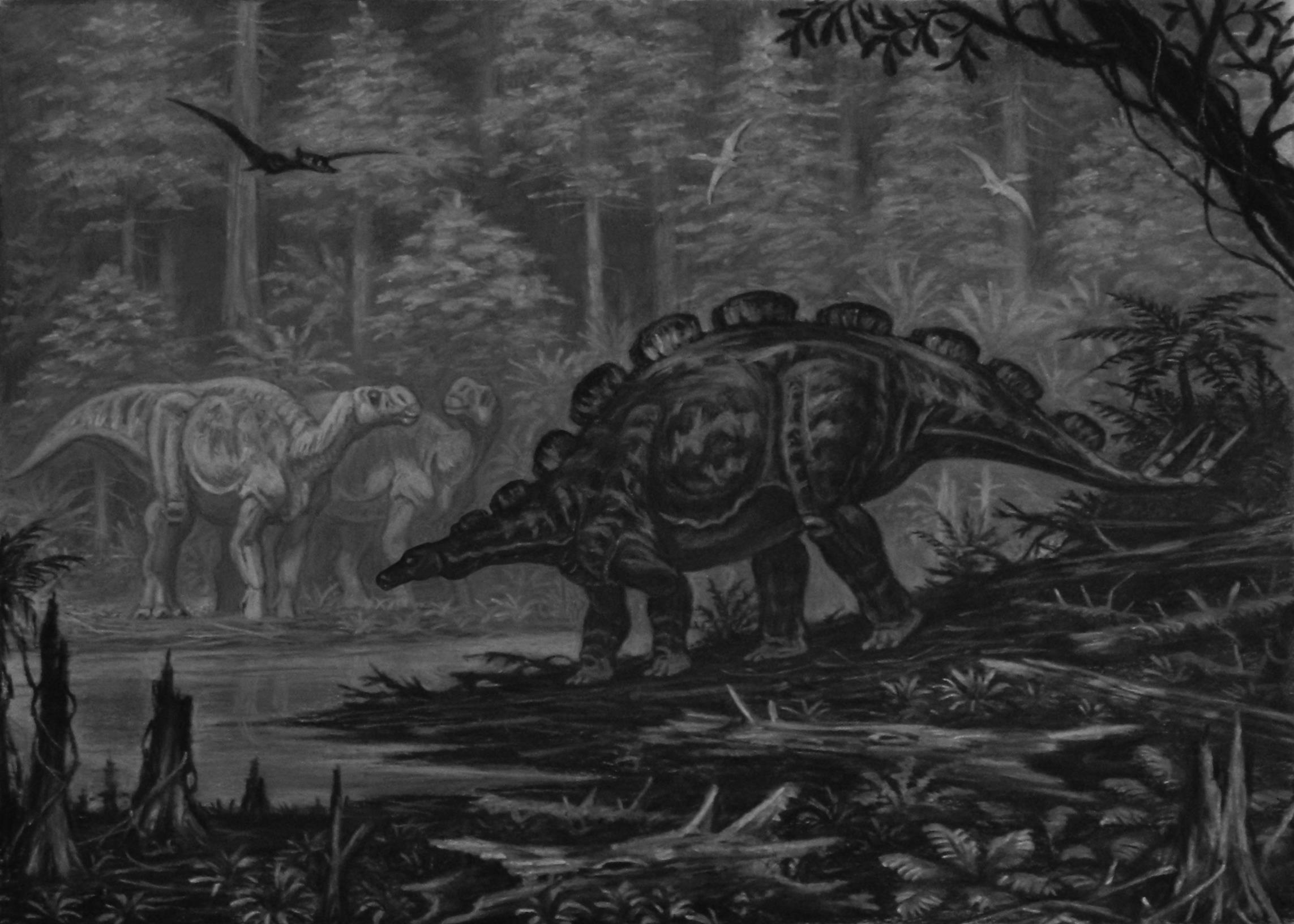
- Restoration of W. homheni with low plates

Scientific classification
- Kingdom: Animalia
- Phylum: Chordata
- Class: Reptilia
- Clade: Dinosauria
- Clade: †Ornithischia
- Clade: †Thyreophora
- Clade: †Stegosauria
- Family: †Stegosauridae
- Subfamily: †Stegosaurinae
- Genus: †Wuerhosaurus; Dong, 1973

Type species
- Wuerhosaurus homheni Dong, 1973

Species
- W. homheni Dong, 1973; W. ordosensis Dong, 1993

Synonyms
- Stegosaurus homheni (Dong, 1973) Maidment et al., 2008

= Wuerhosaurus =

Wuerhosaurus Temporal range: Early Cretaceous, 135.2–Barremian Ma

Extinct genus of dinosaurs

Wuerhosaurus is an extinct genus of stegosaurine stegosaur dinosaurs from the Early Cretaceous of China. The genus contains two species, Wuerhosaurus homheni, the type species named in 1973, and Wuerhosaurus ordosensis, named in 1993. It is one of the youngest (most recent) known stegosaurs in the fossil record, alongside Mongolostegus and Yanbeilong.

== Discovery and species ==
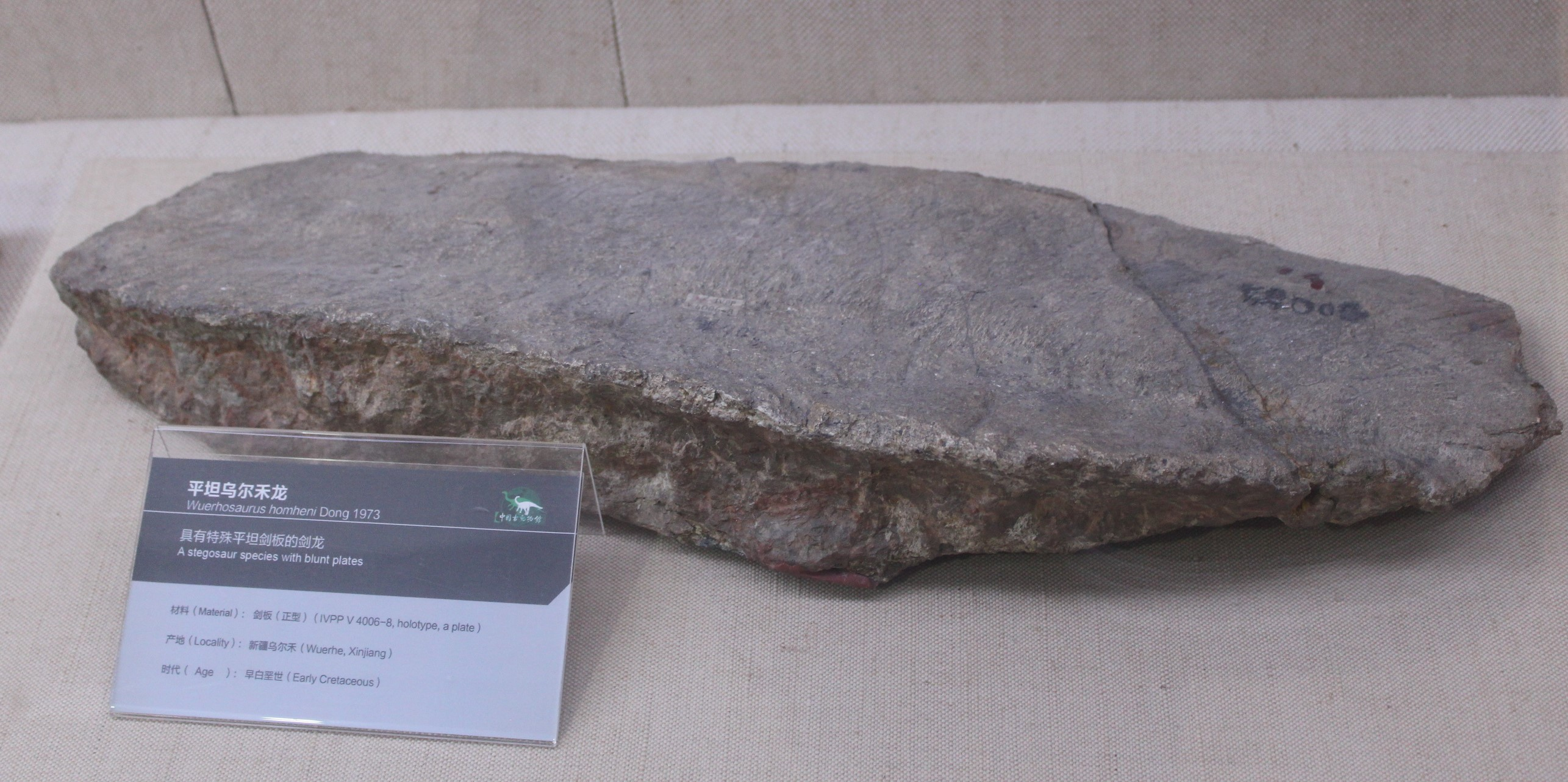
Plate of W. homheni, Paleozoological Museum of China

Wuerhosaurus homheni is the type species, described by Dong Zhiming in 1973 from the Tugulu Group in Xinjiang, western China. The generic name is derived from the city of Wuerho. Three separate localities in the Wuerho Valley were discovered to contain material from the new stegosaur: 64043-5, 64043 and 64045. The remains consisted of the holotype, Institute of Vertebrate Paleontology and Paleoanthropology (IVPP) V.4006, a skull-less fragmentary skeleton, and the paratype IVPP V.4007. Holotype material includes a mostly complete pelvis and sacrum lacking the ischium, the first caudal vertebrae, two dorsal vertebrae, a scapulocoracoid, humerus and phalanx, as well as two dermal plates. Three posterior caudal vertebrae from the tail and a partial ulna of a second individual form the paratype, and Dong referred a partial ischium from a third locality to Wuerhosaurus.

A smaller stegosaur from the Ejinhoro Formation in the Ordos Basin in Inner Mongolia was found in 1988. When the specimen (IVPP V.6877) was described by Dong in 1993, it was named W. ordosensis, as it was from a similar age and had a similar anatomy. The holotype of the species includes a nearly complete torso, consisting of three cervical vertebrae, all eleven dorsal vertebrae (with attached ribs), a complete sacrum with a right ilium, and the first five caudal vertebrae, all articulated. An additional dorsal vertebra and dermal plate were referred to the taxon when it was named. In 2014 Roman Ulansky named a new species of Wuerhosaurus, "W. mongoliensis" for vertebrae and pelvic material, but the name is an invalid nomen nudum. It was formally described as Mongolostegus in 2018.

== Description ==
Wuerhosaurus homheni was probably a broad-bodied animal, reaching 7 metres (23 ft) in length and 4 metric tons (4.4 short tons) in body mass. Only a few scattered bones have been found, making a full restoration difficult. Its dorsal plates were at first thought to have been much rounder or flatter than other stegosaurids, but Maidment established this was an illusion caused by breakage: their actual form is unknown. W. homheni had a pelvis of which the front of the ilia strongly flared outwards indicating a very broad belly. The neural spines on the tail base were exceptionally tall.

In contrast, W. ordosensis was much smaller, estimated by Paul to have been 5 m (16 ft) long and weigh 1.2 metric tons (1.3 short tons). It had a relatively long neck with a broad pelvis, but the neural spines are shorter.

== Classification ==
=== Phylogeny ===
Wuerhosaurus is one of the most derived stegosaurians, being closely related to either Dacentrurus and Hesperosaurus, or Hesperosaurus and Stegosaurus, depending on phylogenetic analysis. Carpenter et al. (2001) recovered Wuerhosaurus in the former relationship, close to Hesperosaurus and Dacentrurus as basal in Stegosauridae. Wuerhosaurus was recovered in a different position by Escaso et al. (2007), still related to Hesperosaurus, but basal to a clade of Lexovisaurus and Stegosaurus. Maidment et al. (2008) recovered a different placement with Wuerhosaurus as being in a clade of taxa in derived Stegosaurinae, most closely related to Hesperosaurus and then Stegosaurus. More recently, Maidment (2017) elaborated upon her earlier analyses, and instead resolved Wuerhosaurus as closest to Stegosaurus, with Hesperosaurus being more closely related to Miragaia. These results are shown below.

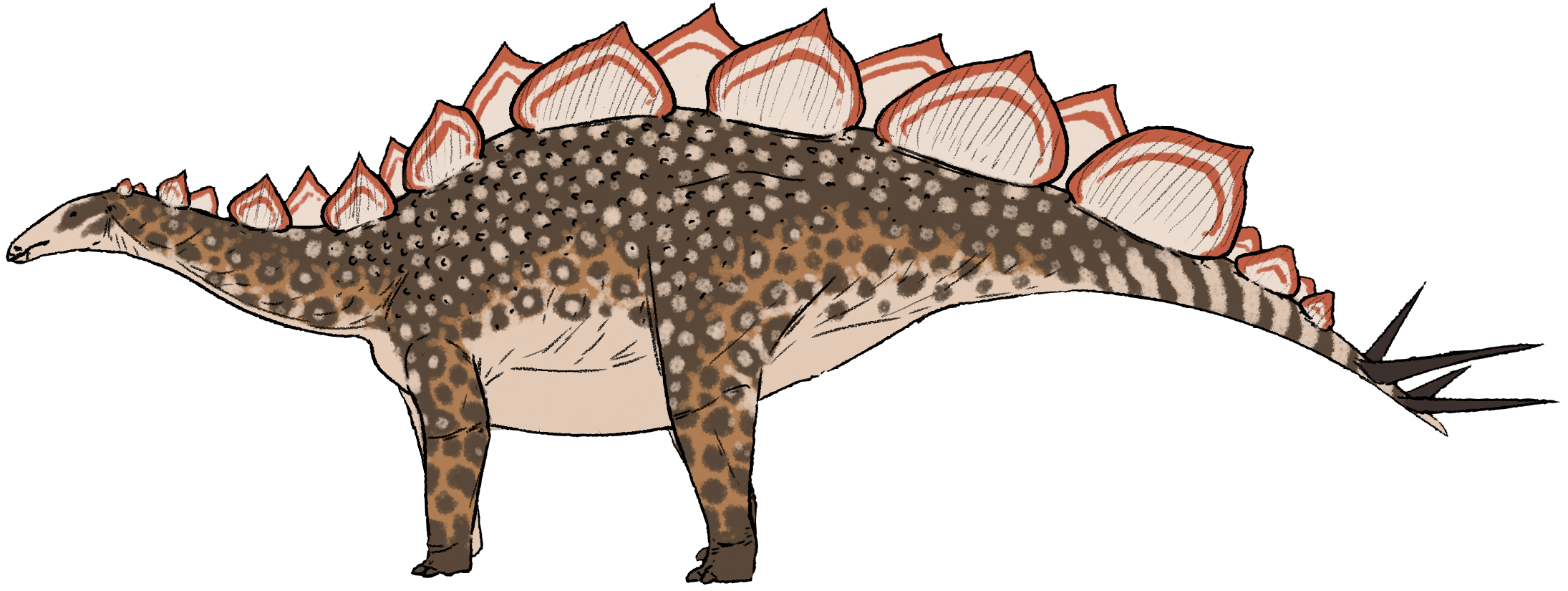
Restoration of W. homheni with tall plates

- Stegosauria
  - - - Huayangosaurus taibaii
      - Chungkingosaurus jiangbeiensis
    - - Tuojiangosaurus multispinus
      - Paranthodon africanus
  - - Jiangjunosaurus junggarensis
    - - Gigantspinosaurus sichuanensis
      - - Kentrosaurus aethiopicus
        - - Dacentrurus armatus
          - - Loricatosaurus priscus
            - - - Hesperosaurus mjosi
                - Miragaia longicollum
              - - Stegosaurus stenops
                - Wuerhosaurus homheni

=== Synonymy with Stegosaurus ===
Maidment and colleagues proposed in 2008 that Wuerhosaurus was a junior synonym of Stegosaurus, with W. homheni being renamed Stegosaurus homheni, and W. ordosensis being a dubious taxon. W. homheni was synonymized because the holotype that could be located was similar to Stegosaurus, and because of its phylogenetic position. Wuerhosaurus placed between Stegosaurus and Hesperosaurus, the latter being considered a species of Stegosaurus because of its age, location, and anatomy. Since Wuerhosaurus placed between two possible Stegosaurus species, Maidment et al. synonymized the taxon as well. Wuerhosaurus ordosensis was considered to be a nomen dubium because the holotype could not be found in the IVPP collections. The original description did not mention any valid diagnostic traits, and no other description provided features either, so Maidment et al. considered the taxon undiagnostic. This opinion has been contested, however, by Carpenter (2010). He discussed how the diagnoses and features used by Maidment et al. were inconsistent and generalized, with Wuerhosaurus homheni bearing numerous differences. As such, Carpenter advocated for the separation of both Hesperosaurus and Wuerhosaurus from Stegosaurus. In 2017, Hou and Ji described and isolated stegosaur sacrum with paired ilia that they referred to W. ordosensis based on similarities to the holotype. The researchers concluded that several anatomical features separated this species from W. homheni.

== Paleoecology ==
The type species, W. homheni, is known from the Tugulu Group, while W. ordosensis is known from the Ejinhoro and Luohandong Formations. The approximate age of Wuerhosaurus is 130 mya, based on the approximate dating of the Tsaganstabian fauna, and thus the stegosaur would have lived in the Hauterivian era, which is roughly coeval with the Wealden group, from which other stegosaur material has been found. Uranium-lead dating has shown that the age of Wuerhosaurus in the Lianmuqin Formation of the Tugulu Group is slightly younger than 135.2 million years old, while Wuerhosaurus in the Ejinhoro Formation is from the Barremian. Stegosaur footprints from the Tugulu Group in Xinjiang Province, China, have been attributed as registered by W. homheni individuals. These tracks include the world's smallest stegosaur tracks, measuring 5.7 cm in length, indicative of a dinosaur that was approximately cat-sized.

== See also ==
- Timeline of stegosaur research
