= Ejinhoro =

Ejinhoro may refer to:

- Ejin Horo Banner, subdivision of Inner Mongolia, China
- Ejinhoro Formation, geological formation in Inner Mongolia, China
