= Zuoyun Formation =

Early Cretaceous geologic formation in China

- Stratigraphic range: Albian
- Type: Geological formation
- Underlies: Zhumapu Formation

Lithology
- Primary: Conglomerate, mudstone

Location
- Coordinates: 40.0°N 112.7°E
- Approximate paleocoordinates: 42.4°N 104.1°E
- Region: Shanxi Province
- Country: China
- Zuoyun Formation (China) Zuoyun Formation (Shanxi)

The Zuoyun Formation is an Early Cretaceous (estimated Albian) geologic formation in Shanxi Province, China. Dinosaur fossils attributable to the genus level are known from this formation. During the Early Cretaceous, the Zuoyun area was generally dominated by an arid subtropical environment. There was irregular alternation of arid and humid climate, during which catastrophic flooding resulted in thick proluvial fan conglomerate-mudstone deposits.

== Dinosaurs ==
Remains of the following dinosaurs have been found in the formation:

Color key: Taxon / Reclassified taxon / Taxon falsely reported as present / Dubious taxon or junior synonym / Ichnotaxon / Ootaxon / Morphotaxon	Notes; Uncertain or tentative taxa are in small text; ~~crossed out~~ taxa are discredited.

=== Dinosaurs ===
Genus	Species	Location	Stratigraphic position	Material	Notes	Images
Yanbeilong	Y. ultimus			Sacrum, pelvic girdle, dorsal vertebrae, and one caudal vertebra	A stegosaurine stegosaurid	

== See also ==
- List of dinosaur-bearing rock formations
