= Ejinhoro Formation =

Geological formation in Inner Mongolia, China

- Stratigraphic range: Early Cretaceous; Barremian
- Type: Geological formation

Lithology
- Primary: Sandstone
- Other: Mudstone, siltstone

Location
- Coordinates: 39.4°N 108.4°E
- Approximate paleocoordinates: 40.5°N 105.5°E
- Region: Inner Mongolia
- Country: China
- Extent: Ordos Basin
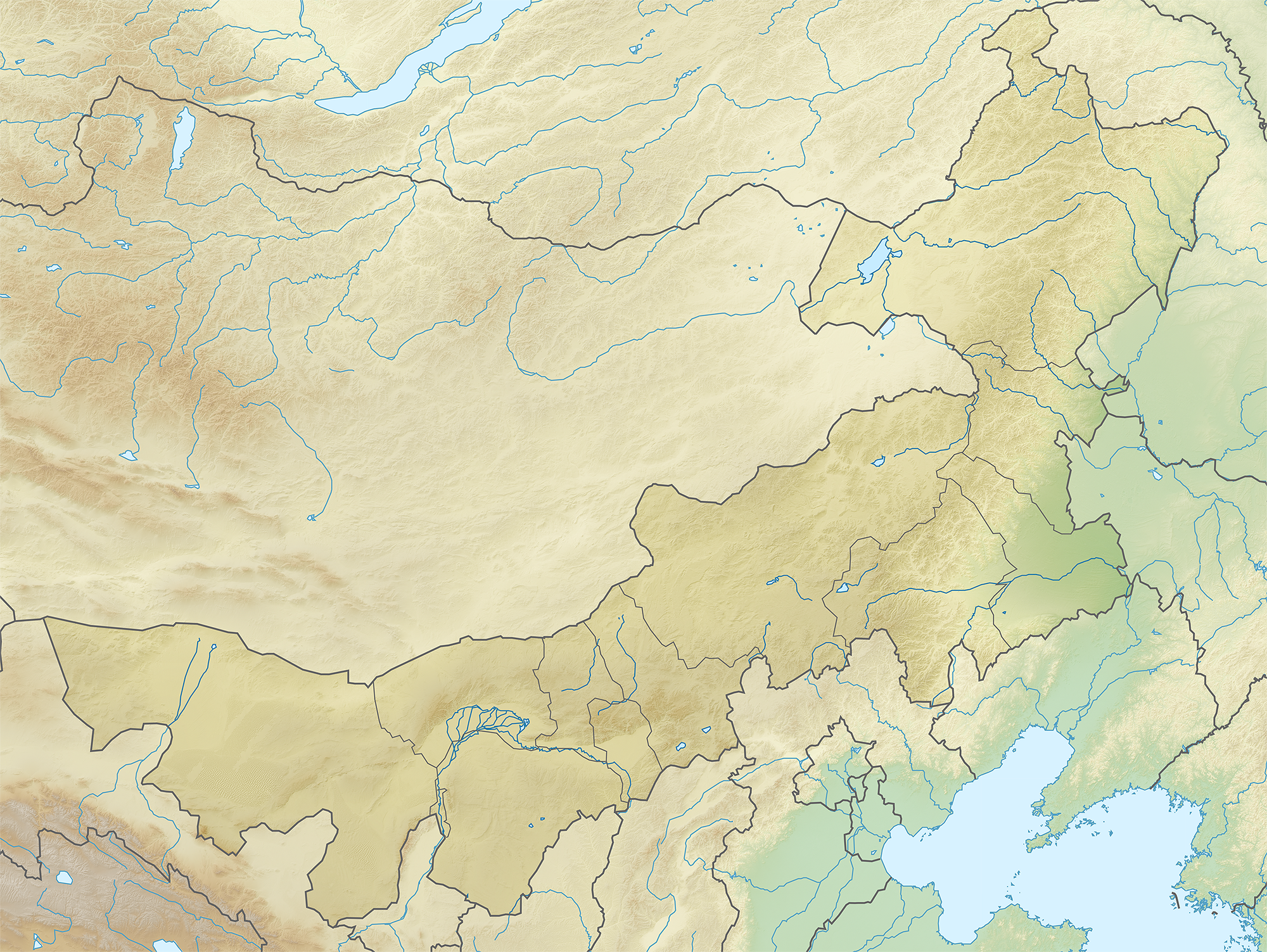
- Ejinhoro Formation (China) Ejinhoro Formation (Inner Mongolia)

The Ejinhoro Formation (simplified Chinese: 伊金霍洛组; traditional Chinese: 伊金霍洛組; pinyin: Yījīnhuòluò Zǔ) is a geological formation in Inner Mongolia, north China, whose strata date back to the Early Cretaceous period (Barremian).

Dinosaur remains are among the fossils that have been recovered from the formation.

== Fossil content ==
=== Mammals ===
Mammals
Taxa	Presence	Notes	Images
Genus: Hangjinia; 1. H. chowi	A single dentary	A gobiconodontid	

=== Dinosaurs ===
Dinosaurs
Taxa	Presence	Notes	Images
Genus: Chiayusaurus; 1. C. sp.	Isolated teeth.	A sauropod.	Sinornithoides Wuerhosaurus
Psittacosaurus; 1. P. neimongoliensis 2. P. ordosensis		A ceratopsian.: 1. "[One] nearly complete skeleton and other fragmentary material." 2. "Partial cranial material."	Sinornithoides Wuerhosaurus
Saurischia; 1. indeterminate		A large saurischian.	Sinornithoides Wuerhosaurus
Sinornithoides; 1. S. youngi	"Near-complete articulated skeleton."	A troodontid.	Sinornithoides Wuerhosaurus
Stegosauridae; 1. indeterminate	Isolated teeth.	A stegosaurid.	Sinornithoides Wuerhosaurus
Wuerhosaurus; 1. W. ordosensis		A large stegosaurid. "Partial skeleton, plate, vertebra, adult."	Sinornithoides Wuerhosaurus

=== Pterosaurs ===
Indeterminate pterosaur remains have also been recovered from the formation.

== See also ==
- List of dinosaur-bearing rock formations
