= Thagomizer =

Spike arrangement on stegosaur tails

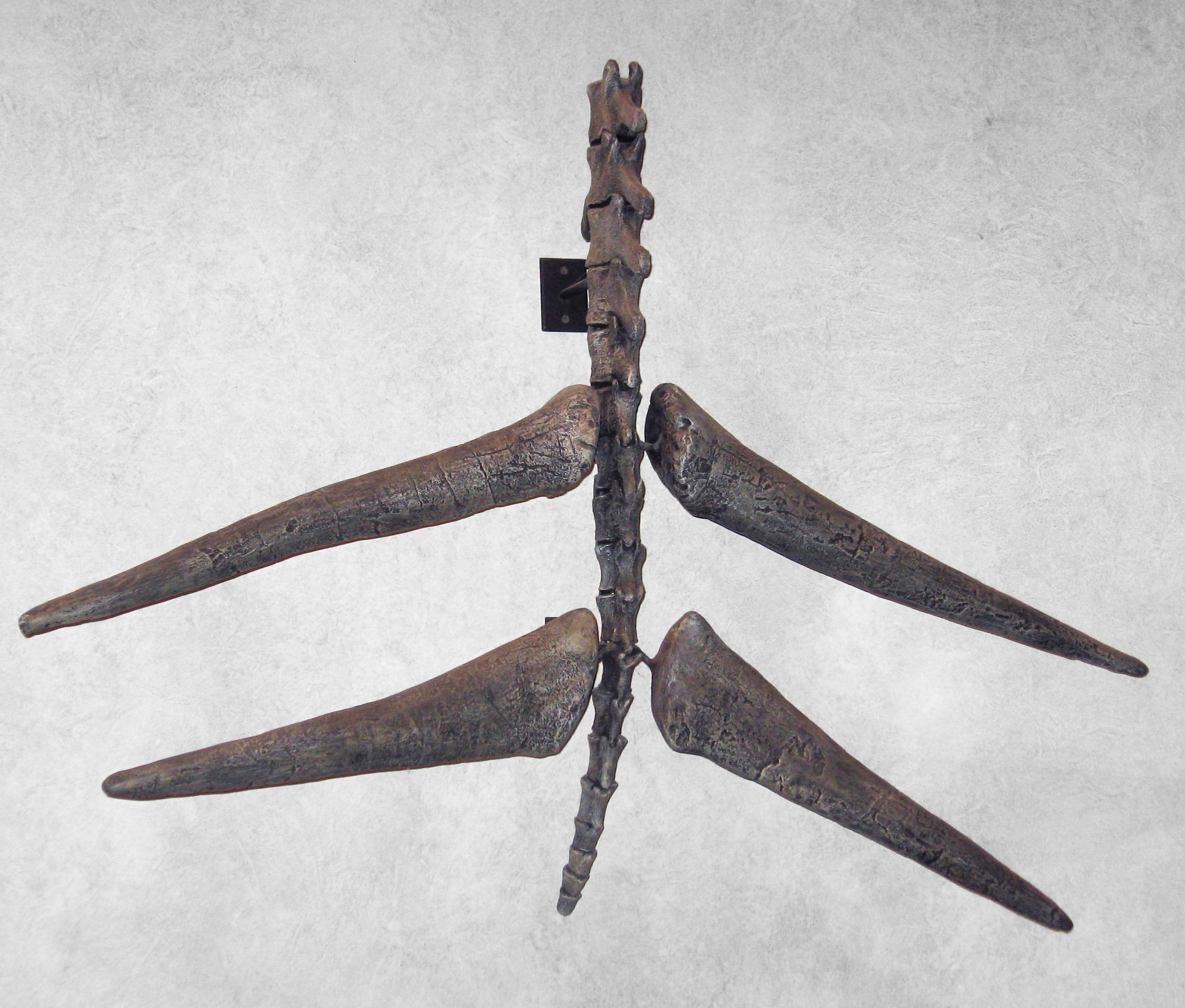
Thagomizer on a mounted Stegosaurus tail

A thagomizer (/ˈθæɡəmaɪzər/) is the distinctive arrangement of spike-shaped osteoderms on the tails of some stegosaurian dinosaurs. These spikes are believed to have been a defensive measure against predators.

The arrangement of spikes originally had no distinct name. Cartoonist Gary Larson invented the name "thagomizer" in 1982 as a joke in his comic strip The Far Side, and it was gradually adopted as an informal term sometimes used within scientific circles, research, and education.

== Etymology ==
This Far Side cartoon is the source of the term thagomizer.

The term thagomizer was coined by Gary Larson in jest. In a 1982 The Far Side comic, a group of cavemen are taught by a caveman lecturer that the spikes on a stegosaur's tail were named "after the late Thag Simmons".

The term was picked up initially by Kenneth Carpenter, then a paleontologist at the Denver Museum of Nature and Science, who used the term when describing a fossil at the Society of Vertebrate Paleontology Annual Meeting in 1993. Thagomizer has since been adopted as an anatomical term and is used by the Smithsonian Institution, the Dinosaur National Monument, the book The Complete Dinosaur and the BBC documentary series Planet Dinosaur. The term has also appeared in some scientific papers describing stegosaurs and related dinosaurs.

== Paleobiology ==
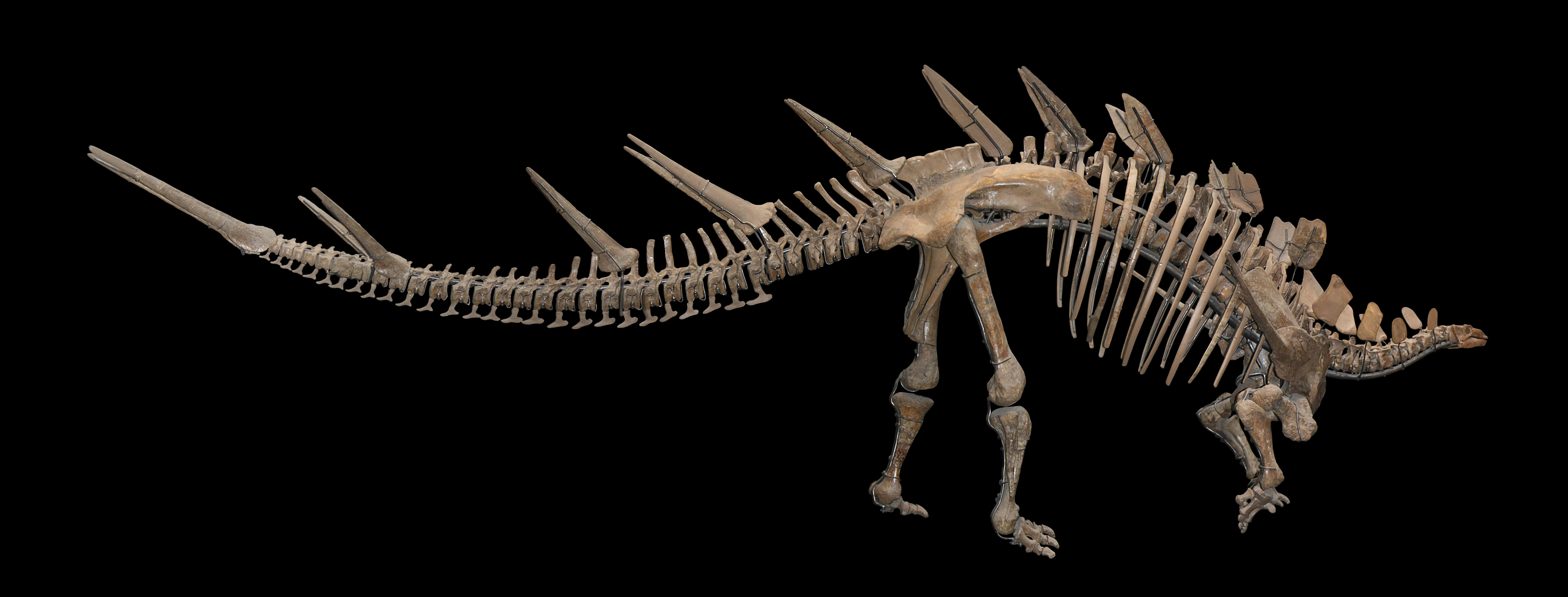
Skeleton of Kentrosaurus

Some stegosaurs such as Kentrosaurus do not have a distinct "thagomizer" consisting of two pairs of spikes, as in these species there is not clear differentiation between the last two pairs on the tail and the other tail osteoderms, which are also spike-like, unlike the broad plate-like osteoderms on the back of Stegosaurus.

There has been debate about whether the thagomizer was used simply for display, as posited by Gilmore in 1914, or used as a defensive weapon. Robert Bakker noted that it is likely that the stegosaur tail was much more flexible than those of other ornithischian dinosaurs because it lacked ossified tendons, thus lending credence to the idea of the thagomizer being a weapon. He also observed that Stegosaurus could have maneuvered its rear easily by keeping its large hindlimbs stationary and pushing off with its very powerfully muscled but short forelimbs, allowing it to swivel deftly to deal with attack. In 2010, analysis of a digitized model of Kentrosaurus aethiopicus showed that the tail could bring the thagomizer around to the sides of the dinosaur, possibly striking an attacker beside it.

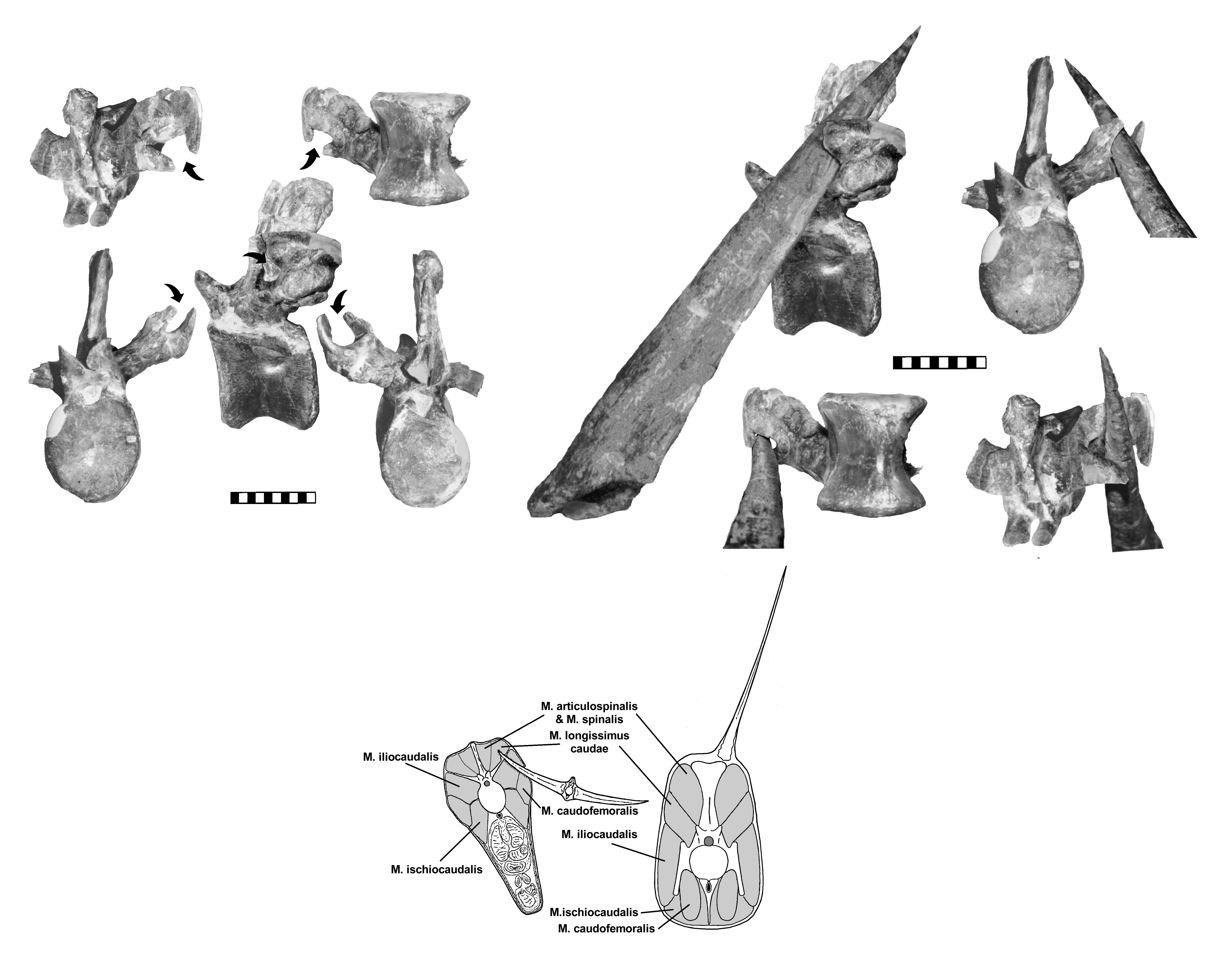
Allosaurus tail vertebra with a hole matching a thagomizer spine

In 2001, a study of thagomizers by McWhinney et al. showed a high incidence of trauma-related damage. This too supports the theory that the principal function of the thagomizer was defense in combat. There is also evidence for a defense function in the form of an Allosaurus tail vertebra with a partially healed puncture wound that fits a Stegosaurus tail spike. This usage of the thagomizer would be similar to defensive behaviors in some extant lizards with tail spikes, such as the giant girdled lizard.

The species of stegosaur known as Stegosaurus stenops had four dermal spikes, each about 60–90 cm (2–3 ft) long. Discoveries of articulated stegosaur armor show that, at least in some species, these spikes protruded horizontally from the tail, not vertically as is often depicted. Initially, Othniel Charles Marsh described S. armatus as having eight spikes in its tail, unlike S. stenops. However, recent research re-examined this and concluded this species also had four.

== Other uses ==
=== Mathematics ===
The thagomizer graph K_{1,1,n} is tripartite

In a 2017 paper, the term thagomizer graph (and also the associated "thagomizer matroid") was introduced for the complete tripartite graph K_{1,1,n}.

=== Molecular biology ===
In 2023, researchers at the University of California, San Francisco presented Thagomizer, a modality for the interrogation of RNA-protein binding events in CLIP-Seq (Cross-linking and immunoprecipitation) data.

== See also ==
- Tail club
- Timeline of stegosaur research
