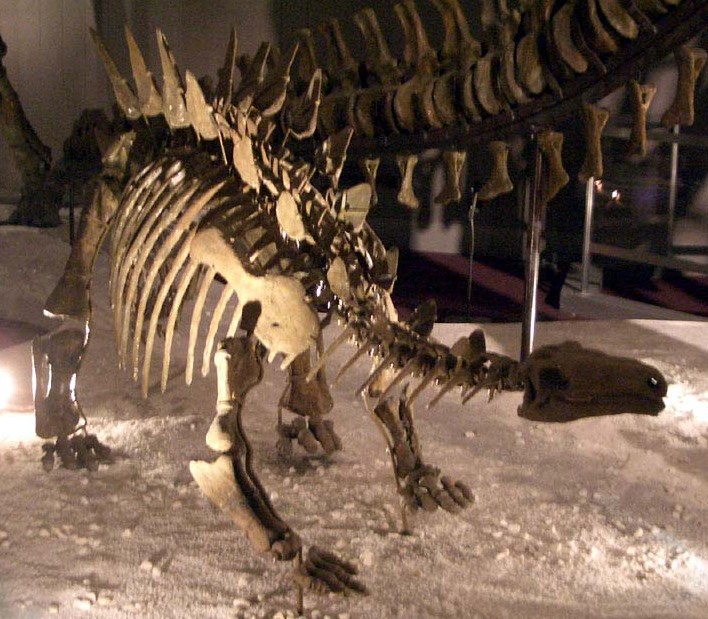
- Mounted skeleton

Scientific classification
- Kingdom: Animalia
- Phylum: Chordata
- Class: Reptilia
- Clade: Dinosauria
- Clade: †Ornithischia
- Clade: †Thyreophora
- Clade: †Stegosauria
- Family: †Huayangosauridae
- Genus: †Chungkingosaurus; Dong et al., 1983
- Species: †C. jiangbeiensis

Binomial name
- †Chungkingosaurus jiangbeiensis Dong et al., 1983

= Chungkingosaurus =

Chungkingosaurus Temporal range: Late Jurassic, 163.5–157.3 Ma

Extinct genus of dinosaurs

Chungkingosaurus (meaning "Chongqing Lizard") is a genus of stegosaurian dinosaur from the Late Jurassic Upper Shaximiao Formation in what is now China. The type species is Chungkingosaurus jiangbeiensis.

== Description ==
Size comparison

According to Dong e.a. the Chungkingosaurus jiangbeiensis holotype was one of the smallest stegosaurs with a length of less than four metres, even though it was apparently an adult, judging by the ossification of the sacrum. Chungkingosaurus sp. 1 was estimated at five metres; Chungkingosaurus sp. 2 was seen as longer than five metres. Dong e.a. indicated that Chungkingosaurus strongly resembled Tuojiangosaurus, found in the same formation, in many anatomical details. Chungkingosaurus was different in its smaller size, deeper snout and front lower jaws (resulting in a relatively high and narrow skull), and non-overlapping teeth with less pronounced denticles.

Chungkingosaurus probably possessed two rows of plates and spikes on its back, which were arranged in pairs, but the total number is unknown. A skeleton model in the Chongqing Municipal museum shows fourteen pairs of plates. This model also has two pairs of tail spikes. The plates of Chungkingosaurus have a thickened middle section, as if they were modified spikes. The plates resemble those of Tuojiangosaurus. The form of the thagomizer, the tail end spikes used as a defensive weapon, is only known from specimen CV 00208. It preserves two pairs of obliquely vertical, rather stout, spikes. Dong et al. reported that a third pair to the front of these was originally present but lost during the excavation. A unique feature is the presence of an additional pair at the very tail end, consisting of long thin spikes oriented almost horizontally and obliquely to the sides and rear in top view. Paul described this kind of thagomizer as a "pin-cushion array". The thagomizer of Tuojiangosaurus is not known from articulated remains.

== Discovery and species ==
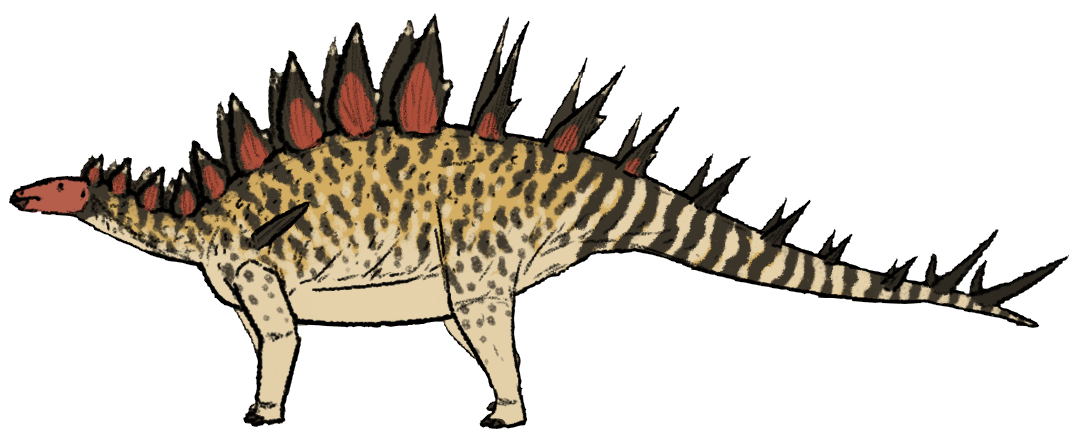
Life restoration

Fossils of Chungkingosaurus were found near Chongqing, China, from 1977 onwards. The type species, Chungkingosaurus jiangbeiensis, was named and described by Dong Zhiming, Zhou Shiwu, and Zhang Yihong in 1983. The generic name refers to Chongqing (previously transliterated as Chungking) in Sichuan. The specific name refers to the district of Jiangbei.

The holotype, CV 00206, was found in the Chungking Group of the Upper Shaximiao Formation. It consists of a partial skeleton, containing the snout, the front of the lower jaws, ten dorsal vertebrae, a pelvis with sacrum, a series of twenty-three tail vertebrae, the lower end of a humerus, three metacarpals, both thighbones and shinbones and five back plates.

Dong e.a. in 1983 described three additional species. These were not separately named but identified as Chungkingosaurus sp. 1–3. Chungkingosaurus sp. 1 was based on specimen CV 00207, a pelvis with sacrum. The next species, Chungkingosaurus sp. 2, was based on specimen CV 00205, a partial skeleton. The last species, Chungkingosaurus sp. 3, was based on specimen CV 00208, a series of ten vertebrae of a tail end with an articulated thagomizer. In 2014, Roman Ulansky named CV 00205 Chungkingosaurus giganticus, and CV 00207 Chungkingosaurus magnus. Peter Malcolm Galton and Kenneth Carpenter later identified both as nomina dubia, referring both to C. jiangbeiensis.

In 2006, Susannah Maidment and Wei Guangbiao considered Chungkingosaurus a valid genus, even though much of the material could no longer be localised. Specimen CV 00207 was by them no longer referred to Chungkingosaurus. However, Gregory S. Paul in 2010 suggested that Chungkingosaurus was the juvenile of Tuojiangosaurus.

== Classification ==
Chungkingosaurus was in 1983 by Dong e.a. placed in the Stegosaurinae. In 2006 Maidment & Wei considered it a basal member of the Stegosauria. In 2008 Maidment e.a. assigned it to the Huayangosauridae.

== Paleobiology ==
Like all stegosaurs, Chungkingosaurus was a herbivore. Chungkingosaurus is thought to have coexisted with large plant-eaters and stegosaurids such as Chialingosaurus, Tuojiangosaurus, Mamenchisaurus, and Omeisaurus. It may have also been preyed upon by theropods such as Yangchuanosaurus.

== See also ==
- Timeline of stegosaur research
