= Kenneth Carpenter =

American paleontologist (born 1949)

- Born: 21 September 1949 (age 77); Tokyo, Japan
- Education: University of Colorado Boulder

Kenneth Carpenter (born 21 September 1949) is an American paleontologist. He is the former director of the USU Eastern Prehistoric Museum and author or co-author of books on dinosaurs and Mesozoic life. His main research interests are armored dinosaurs (Ankylosauria and Stegosauria), as well as the Early Cretaceous dinosaurs from the Cedar Mountain Formation in eastern Utah.

== Bibliography ==
- Kenneth Carpenter, (1999) Eggs, Nests, and Baby Dinosaurs: A Look at Dinosaur Reproduction (Life of the Past), Indiana University Press; ISBN 0-253-33497-7.
- ----- The Dinosaurs of Marsh and Cope (out of print).
- Kenneth Carpenter (Editor), Philip J. Currie (Editor) (1992) Dinosaur Systematics: Approaches and Perspectives Cambridge University Press, Paperback ISBN 0-521-43810-1 ; Hardcover (1990) ISBN 0-521-36672-0
- Kenneth Carpenter (Editor), Karl F. Hirsch (Editor), John R. Horner (Editor), (1994) Dinosaur Eggs and Babies, Cambridge University Press ISBN 0-521-44342-3 ; Paperback ISBN 0-521-56723-8
- The Upper Jurassic Morrison Formation - an Interdisciplinary Study - Results of a Symposium held at the Denver Museum of Natural History, May 26–28, 1994, Guest Editors: Kenneth Carpenter, Daniel J. Chure, and James I. Kirkland., Modern Geology, (ISBN 90-5699-183-3) Volumes 22 and 23.
- J. D. Lees, Marc Cerasini, Kenneth Carpenter, Alfonsi (1998) The Official Godzilla Compendium. Random House (Merchandising); ISBN 0-679-88822-5
- Acrocanthosaurus: Inside and Out
