= Hekou Group =

- Stratigraphic range: Early Cretaceous, Valanginian–Albian
- Type: Geologic group
- Sub-units: Huazhuang Formation, Hongkoucheng Formation, Yanguoxia Formation, Zhujiatai Formation
- Underlies: Unconformity: Minhe Formation
- Overlies: Unconformity: Xiangtang Formation
- Thickness: 3,700 m (12,100 ft)

Lithology
- Primary: Sandstone, mudstone, conglomerate

Location
- Coordinates: 35.9°N 103.3°E
- Approximate paleocoordinates: 34.8°N 103.1°E
- Region: Gansu
- Country: China
- Extent: Longzhong Basin
- Hekou Group (China) Hekou Group (Gansu)

The Hekou Group is a geological group in Gansu Province, China. It is Early Cretaceous in age. Many dinosaur fossils have been recovered from the Hekou Group, including iguanodonts, large sauropods, and armored dinosaurs. Fossil eggs are rare, but one oogenus, Polyclonoolithus, was discovered in the Hekou Group. Extensive fossil tracks belonging to pterosaurs and dinosaurs have also been described. The group spans the Valanginian to Albian and can be subdivided into four formations.

== Fossil content ==
Color key: Taxon / Reclassified taxon / Taxon falsely reported as present / Dubious taxon or junior synonym / Ichnotaxon / Ootaxon / Morphotaxon	Notes; Uncertain or tentative taxa are in small text; ~~crossed out~~ taxa are discredited.

=== Dinosaurs ===
==== Ornithischians ====
Ornithischians of the Hekou Group
Genus	Species	Location	Stratigraphic position	Material	Notes	Images
Lanzhousaurus	L. magnidens			A partial skeleton including the mandible, maxillary teeth, dentary teeth, cervical and dorsal vertebrae, sternal plates, ribs, and pubes	A large styracosternan iguanodontian	
Stegosaurinae Indet.	Indeterminate			A partial skeleton including cervical and dorsal vertebrae, ribs, a right forelimb (including a partial humerus, ulna, and radius), and one dermal plate	An unnamed stegosaurid distinct from Wuerhosaurus and Stegosaurus stenops.	
Taohelong	T. jinchengensis			A partial skeleton including ribs, a left ilium, a caudal vertebra, and part of the sacral shield	A polacanthine nodosaurid	

==== Sauropods ====
Sauropods of the Hekou Group
Genus	Species	Location	Stratigraphic position	Material	Notes	Images
Daxiatitan	D. binglingi			A partial skeleton including cervical, dorsal, and caudal vertebrae, ribs, and a haemal arch, scapulocoracoid, and femur	A titanosaurian sauropod	
Huanghetitan	H. liujiaxiaensis			A partial skeleton including caudal vertebrae, a partial sacrum and ribs, and the left shoulder girdle	A somphospondylian sauropod	
Yongjinglong	Y. datangi			A partial skeleton including teeth, cervical and dorsal vertebrae, a rib, the left scapulocoracoid, and the right ulna and radius	A euhelopodid somphospondylian	

=== Fish ===
==== Ray-finned Fish ====
Ray-finned Fish of the Helou Group
Genus	Species	Location	Stratigraphic position	Material	Notes	Images
Sinamia	S. lanshoensis			Many well-preserved specimens as part and counterpart fossils	A sinamiid amiiform	

== See also ==
- List of fossil sites
- List of dinosaur bearing rock formations
