= Yingshanosaurus =

Yingshanosaurus Temporal range: Middle Jurassic, ~latest Bathonian–early Callovian
- Reconstructed skeleton with known material in white

Scientific classification
- Kingdom: Animalia
- Phylum: Chordata
- Class: Reptilia
- Clade: Dinosauria
- Clade: †Ornithischia
- Clade: †Thyreophora
- Clade: †Stegosauria
- Family: †Stegosauridae
- Subfamily: †Stegosaurinae
- Genus: †Yingshanosaurus; Zhu, 1994
- Species: †Y. jichuanensis

Binomial name
- †Yingshanosaurus jichuanensis Zhu, 1994

Genus of stegosaurian dinosaur

Yingshanosaurus (meaning "Yingshan lizard") is an extinct genus of stegosaurian dinosaur from the Middle Jurassic of what is now Southwestern China. It is known from a partial skeleton discovered in 1983, including back, sacrum, and tail vertebrae, forelimb and hindlimb bones, shoulder and hip bones, and several osteoderms, including plates and a shoulder spine. The genus contains a single species, Yingshanosaurus jichuanensis, named and described in 1994. For some time after its discovery and scientific description, many paleontologists were unaware of the Chinese research published on it and questioned its validity.

Like other stegosaurs, Yingshanosaurus was a slow-moving, quadrupedal herbivore. At 4–5 metres (13–16 ft) long, it is a medium-sized member of this group. Its forelimbs are relatively short in relation to its hindlimbs, and it has a wide torso with a broad back. Several flattened, semi-triangular plates were arranged in pairs along the neck, back, and tail. The large spine near its shoulder likely functioned as a form of protection from predators for its torso. It probably had a pair of spines at the tip of its tail like other stegosaurs, though none are currently known. Unlike many earlier species, the fenestrae (holes) between vertebrae in the sacrum are almost completely closed. While all of the stegosaurs contemporary with Yingshanosaurus are part of earlier-diverging groups in this clade, its anatomy suggests it had derived traits consistent with members of the more exclusive subfamily Stegosaurinae.

Yingshanosaurus is known from the Upper Shaximiao Formation, which dates to the Bathonian–Callovian ages of the Jurassic period. This formation has also yielded abundant fossils of diverse dinosaurs, including other stegosaurs and many sauropods, theropods, and early ornithischians, in addition to turtles, crocodyliforms, mammal relatives, and fish. These fossils were deposited in a semi-arid to semi-humid environment with meandering rivers.

== Discovery and naming ==
Location of Yingshan County in China, where Yingshanosaurus was found

In 1983, a villager in the town of Jichuan discovered a partial associated dinosaur skeleton while digging the foundation for his house in Yingshan County of Sichuan Province, China. After he contacted the Nanchong Cultural Bureau, a team led by Zhu Songlin from the Chongqing Natural History Museum and Zou Jian, with assistance from the Nanchong Cultural Bureau and Yingshan Cultural Center, conducted preliminary excavations at the site. The type locality represents outcrops of the Jurassic Shaximiao Formation. In January of the following year, Zhu revisited the site to unearth the remaining fossil material. The collected specimen consists of much of a partially articulated skeleton, comprising nine dorsal vertebrae, a nearly complete ilio-sacral block and pelvic girdle, seven caudal vertebrae and haemal arches, some dorsal ribs, the left scapulocoracoid and a partial left forelimb, most of the left hindlimb, and five osteoderms. It is accessioned at the Chongqing Natural History Museum.

Later in 1984, in a volume describing the diversity of stegosaur fossils in the Sichuan Basin, Zhou Shiwu briefly reported on the discovery and provided a figure of the specimen's pelvis and a single dorsal plate. Zhou noted that preliminary observations of the skeleton confidently placed the animal as a member of the 'evolutionarily advanced' clade Stegosaurinae. Zhou later discussed the specimen at a 1985 dinosaur symposium in Toulouse, France. This lecture was published in 1986. Through 1992 and 1993, a mounted skeleton of this specimen was displayed in a Japanese exhibition of Chinese dinosaurs, where it was also referenced under the mistranslated title "Yunshanosaurus". However, the name remained a nomen nudum ("naked name") because a formal description of the bones had not yet been published.

In 1994, Zhu Songlin described Yingshanosaurus jichuanensis as a distinct genus and species of stegosaurian dinosaurs, establishing the partial skeleton as the holotype specimen, CV00722. The generic name, Yingshanosaurus, combines a reference to the discovery of the specimen in Yingshan County with the Greek σαῦρος (sauros), meaning "reptile". The specific name, jichuanensis, references the type locality in Jichuan Township.

Due to the limited availability of Zhu's 1994 publication, the validity of Yingshanosaurus went unnoticed by many researchers outside of China; in their 2006 review of Chinese stegosaurs, Maidment & Wei stated they were unable to find a description, a diagnosis, or any published figures of the Yingshanosaurus fossils, and, as such, the name should be recognized as a nomen nudum. In 2007, Wings, Pfretzschner & Maisch reiterated this claim, expressing that a formal description was lacking. Some popular science books on dinosaurs and paleontology have even included Yingshanosaurus with disclaimers regarding the informality of its name. While the validity of Yingshanosaurus has subsequently been reaffirmed, it is rarely mentioned in the scientific literature outside of China.

== Description ==
Size of Yingshanosaurus compared to a human

As a stegosaur, Yingshanosaurus would have been a quadrupedal herbivore with a row of large paired plates and spines along the top of the animal from the neck to the tail tip. The purpose of these osteoderms is debated. The plates have been suggested to play a role in display, species recognition, or thermoregulation. Due to their thinness, fragility, and upright arrangement, the plates did not function as armor. In contrast, the spikes at the end of the tail, sometimes referred to as the 'thagomizer', likely served as defensive structures. Other traits typical of species in this clade include a proportionally small head, short forelimbs, longer column-like hindlimbs, and short metacarpals and metatarsals.

The known fossil material of Yingshanosaurus indicates it was a medium-sized stegosaur with a body length of around 4–5 metres (13–16 ft). This is similar to the more well-known stegosaur genus Kentrosaurus from the Tendaguru Formation of Tanzania, which is estimated at 4 metres (13 ft) long. Based on the fusion of several bones, including the scapula to the coracoid and the tibia to the fibula, the Yingshanosaurus holotype can be identified as a mature adult individual.

=== Skeleton ===
In total, nine dorsal vertebrae are known for Yingshanosaurus. The first is a nearly complete anterior (front) vertebra missing the tip of the neural spine. The length and width of the centrum are approximately equal, and the articular surfaces are slightly concave but nearly amphiplatian (flat). The neural canal is large. Two associated middle dorsal vertebrae are preserved, although both are missing the neural spines, transverse processes, and parts of the centra. The neural arches are tall, with vertically elongated neural canals—a characteristic feature of stegosaurs. The last six consecutive posterior dorsals are known, articulated with the sacrum. The first three of these are missing at least part of the centum due to taphonomic weathering, the fourth and fifth are complete, and the sixth is missing the neural spine. The neural arches are even taller than those of the mid-dorsals. The neural canals are generally triangular. The neural spines are thin and inclined posteriorly, with the flattened tops expanded outward. The postzygapophyses of the last dorsal are notably more expanded and robust. The transverse processes project at angle of about 60° relative to the neural spine. The proximal ends of two dorsal ribs were found in association with the last dorsal vertebrae. Based on their morphology, Yingshanosaurus likely had a broad back similar to some other stegosaurs like Wuerhosaurus.

The sacrum is composed of five firmly fused vertebrae, the first of which is a dorsosacral (reinforced dorsal vertebra). The height of the centra and neural spines increases from front to back. The neural spine tips bear prominent ossified tendons. The sacral ribs extend laterally, firmly fusing to the ilia. In ventral (bottom) view, the gaps between these form three large elliptical fenestrae. In dorsal (top) view, these fenestrae are extremely reduced, with a maximum diameter of 1 centimetre (0.39 in).

Seven fairly complete caudal vertebrae are known for Yingshanosaurus. The first two caudals in the series are preserved, both demonstrating similar anatomy. The anterior surfaces of their centra are mostly flat, and the posterior surfaces are concave. The transverse processes and caudal ribs are fused into platelike triangular structures projecting laterally. The neural spines are tall, although the tip is not preserved in the second caudal. In the first, the tip is expanded but not bifurcated, in contrast to some other stegosaurs like Stegosaurus. Three anterior caudal vertebrae are known, with biconcave centra. The transverse processes are rodlike and directed ventrally. The neural spines are tall, with expanded apices wider than the bases. Two middle caudal vertebrae are also preserved, demonstrating laterally compressed biconcave centra that are longer than they are wide. The neural spines are platelike and inclined posteriorly, without expanded tips. Seven haemal arches were found which demonstrate typical stegosaur anatomy, contrasting with the inverted T-shape seen in the haemal arches of Kentrosaurus.

The left scapulocoracoid of Yingshanosaurus is well-preserved. The scapula shaft is constricted at the base, with the posterior end expanded and flattened into a platelike surface. The oval-shaped coracoid features a foramen that does not penetrate through the bone. The known bones of the left forelimb include a humerus, radius, and isolated metacarpal. The humerus is 40 centimetres (16 in) long, with a short shaft. The radius, a simple straight bone expanded on both ends, is 30.5 centimetres (12.0 in) long. The metacarpal is identified as the second based on the shape and size.

Both ilia are preserved, with a maximum length of 80 centimetres (31 in). The elongate preacetabular process, a characteristic of stegosaurs, extends dorsolaterally. It is not preserved on the right side. The iliac processes taper to a triangle. The acetabulum is deep, with a well-developed pubic process. The left and right prepubic processes of the pubis are preserved, but the posterior processes are missing. The processes are platelike, with expanded ends, and the obturator foramen is open. The left ischium is slightly curved, with a well-developed iliac peduncle (articular process for the ilium) and a thin pubic peduncle (articular process for the pubis).

The known bones of the hindlimb include the left femur, tibia, and fibula, and bones from both feet. The femur is 67.5 centimetres (26.6 in) long, with a straight shaft and well-developed greater trochanter. The tibia and fibula are firmly fused to each other, with a maximum length of about 46 centimetres (18 in). The astragalus is fused to the tibia. The fibula is slender, and slightly longer than the tibia. The foot bones include the right metatarsal I and III, left metatarsal III, and one pedal phalanx articulated with the left metatarsal. The third metatarsals are wider than the first, and the phalanx is small with a short shaft.

=== Osteoderms ===
Illustration of osteoderms known from Yingshanosaurus: the parascapular spine (A) and three dorsal plates (B–D)

The Yingshanosaurus holotype includes five nearly complete osteoderms—large bony structures embedded in the skin—from various regions of the body. The largest of these, at about 80 centimetres (31 in) long, is a left parascapular spine from the shoulder region. The base is formed by an expanded angular plate with a flattened platform-like surface to attach to the torso. A large, slightly curved spike protrudes backward from the base. The contemporary Gigantspinosaurus has a similar large shoulder spine. Before the discovery of the Gigantspinosaurus holotype, which preserves both parascapular spines in articulation with the rest of the body, the identity of these large osteoderms and their articulation with the body was unclear, and some early reconstructions placed them near the pelvic girdle as "parasacral spines". It is now understood that the broad bases of these spines would have lain parallel to the body surface at the posteroventral (toward the back and rear) edge of the scapular blade, with the spine projecting posterolaterally (outward and toward the back) outside of the body. This spine almost certainly functioned as a protection for the trunk, and may have been able to rotate slightly around the scapula.

The remaining four osteoderms are broad plates from the back and tail, comprising a pentagonal anterior dorsal plate, a teardrop-shaped middle dorsal plate, and two triangular anterior caudal plates. All of the plates are thin in cross section, increasing in thickness toward the widened bases. The underside of the plates feature wrinkled textures where they would be embedded in the skin. The two caudal plates were found in close association and are nearly identical in size and shape. This suggests the plates of Yingshanosaurus were arranged in symmetrical pairs along the dorsal midline, contrasting with some stegosaurs like Stegosaurus, where the plates were in a staggered, alternating row. The plates of Yingshanosaurus are proportionally small, similar in relative scale to those of Kentrosaurus and Dacentrurus, but not the much larger ones of Stegosaurus.

== Classification ==
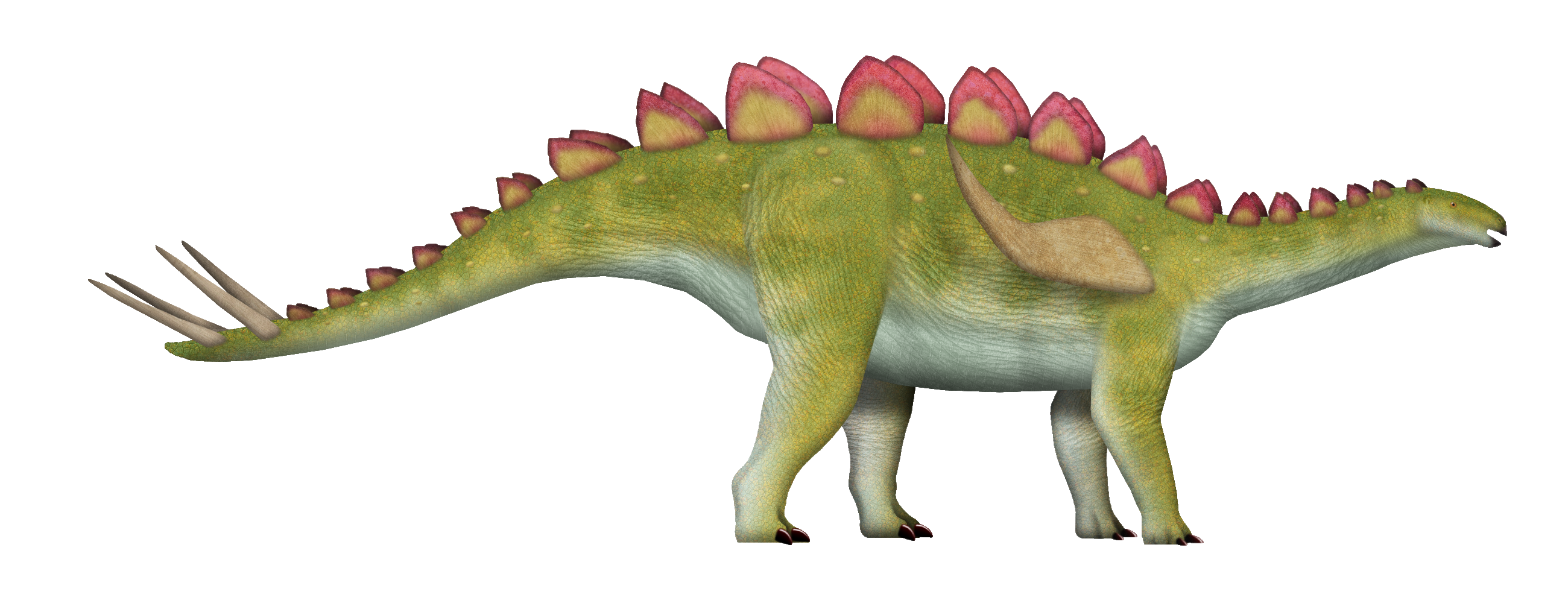
Speculative life restoration

In his 1994 description of Yingshanosaurus, Zhu reasoned that the genus could be identified as a later-diverging stegosaurine within the stegosaurian family Stegosauridae, in comparison to the other stegosaurs found in the Shaximao Formation, which are recognized as more basal taxa. These other stegosaurs, which include Huayangosaurus and its relatives, have similar forelimb and hindlimb lengths, spikelike plates, and more prominent sacral fenestrae. Zhu argued that the comparatively short forelimbs, broad plates, reinforced pelvic girdle with a nearly fused sacral region, in addition to the tall dorsal vertebral neural spines and expanded caudal neural spine tips, were evidence of this classification. He also observed that the ratio of the femur to tibia length is more similar to the stegosaurid Kentrosaurus, than to Stegosaurus and Dacentrurus.

The presence of a derived stegosaurine like Yingshanosaurus in a formation otherwise dominated by more "primitive" taxa led Hao et al. (2018) to construct a tentative cladogram to illustrate the evolutionary relationships of Chinese stegosaurs. They placed Yingshanosaurus as the most derived stegosaur in the Sichuan Basin. While they did not reconstruct the precise relationships of stegosaurids, they speculated that the taxa diverged roughly in the order displayed in the diagram below, although they noted that the placements of Chialingosaurus and Jiangjunosaurus are tentative.

- Stegosauria
  - Gigantspinosaurus
  - Huayangosauridae
    - Huayangosaurus
    - Chungkingosaurus
  - Stegosauridae
    - Chialingosaurus
    - Tuojiangosaurus
    - Jiangjunosaurus
    - Yingshanosaurus
    - Monkonosaurus
    - Wuerhosaurus

== Paleoecology ==
=== Age and palaeoenvironment ===
Yingshanosaurus is known from the uppermost part of the Upper Member of the Shaximiao Formation. Analyses of the sedimentology and elemental geochemistry of this formation indicate that the depositional environment was semi-arid to semi-humid, with meandering rivers and a complex seasonal lake system. During the wet, flooding season, the lake level was high, surrounded by a small alluvial plain. During the drier season, small ephemeral lakes were scattered throughout a much larger alluvial plain.

The age of the rock layers of the Upper Shaximiao Formation has been debated, with estimates in 2011 proposing a Bajocian–Bathonian age range in the Middle Jurassic epoch. Subsequent research determined that the older Lower Member could be reliably dated to the Bathonian (166 ± 1.5 Ma), setting this as the oldest possible age for the Upper Member. In 2026, zircon U–Pb ages of 164.4 ± 1.7 Ma and 163.7 ± 0.9 Ma were obtained from a dinosaur-bearing locality of the upper Shaximiao Formation, suggesting that at least that region can be placed within the latest Bathonian to early Callovian.

=== Contemporary fauna ===
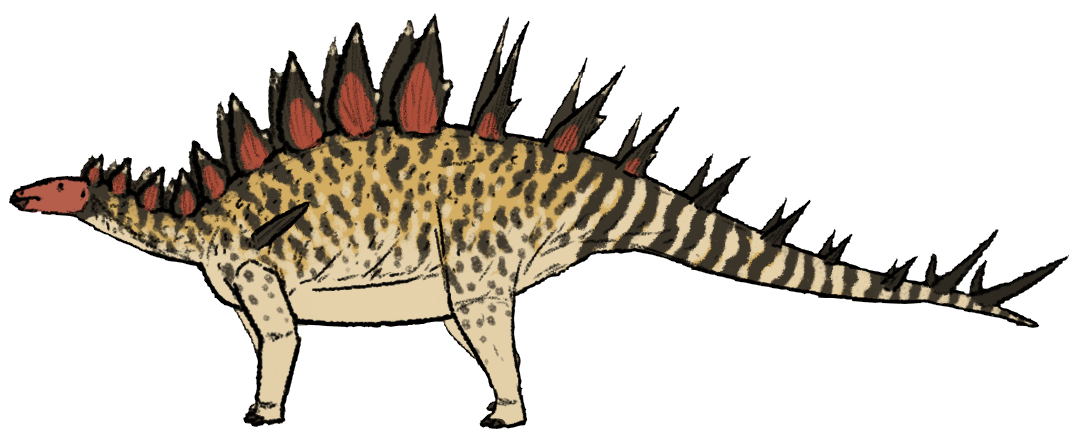
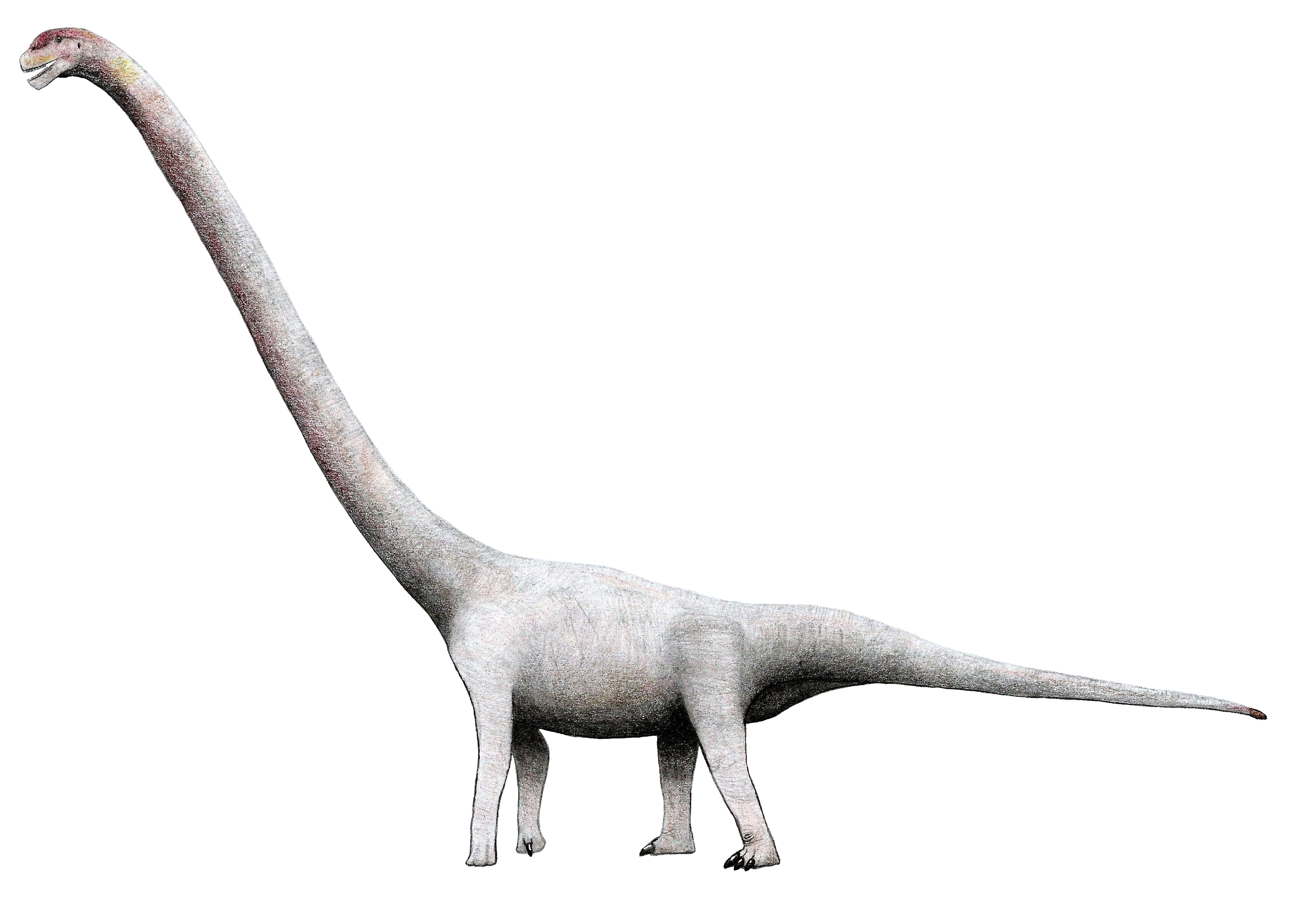
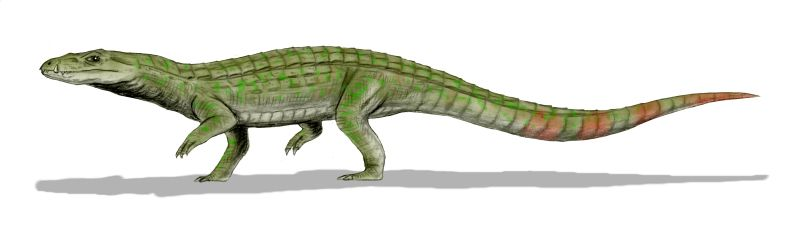
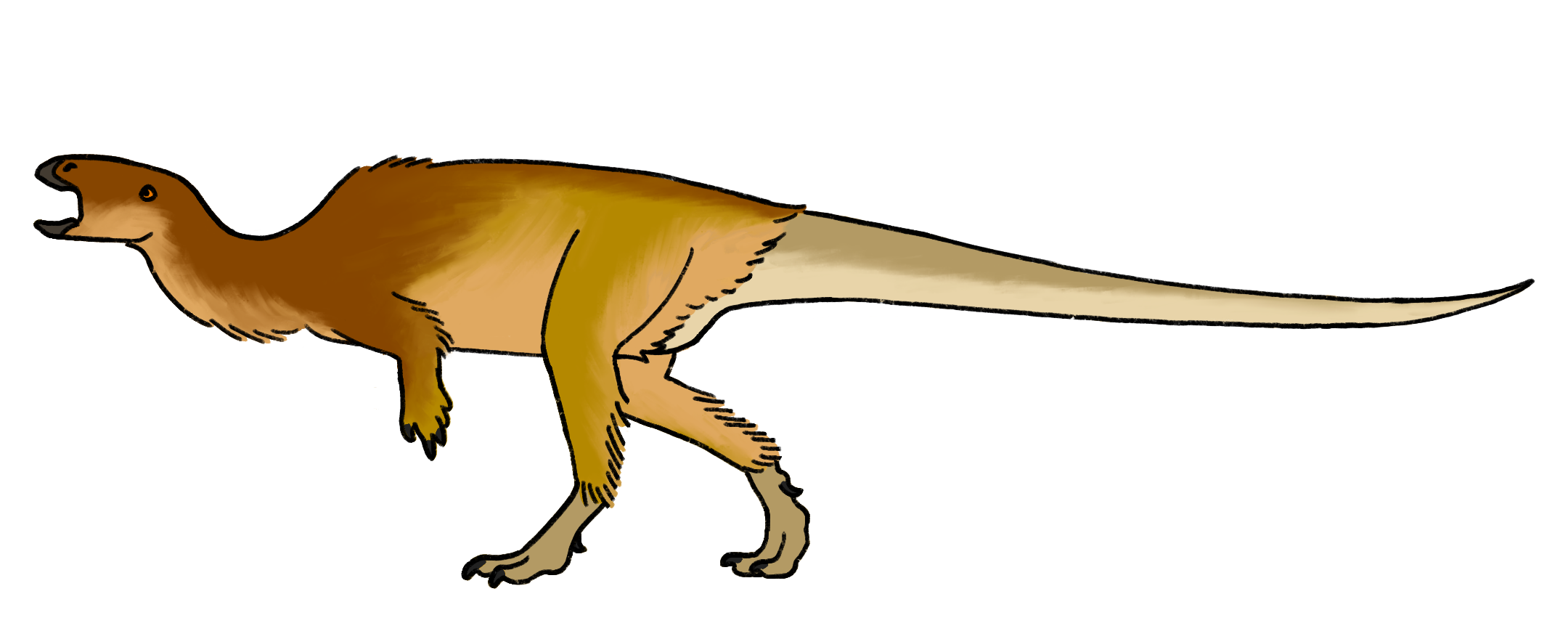
Speculative life restorations of various reptile genera known from the Upper Member of the Shaximiao Formation. In clockwise order from top left: Chungkingosaurus, Omeisaurus, Yandusaurus, and Sichuanosuchus

Many other fossil taxa have been found in localities of the Upper Shaximiao Formation, but they may not have been strictly coeval with Yingshanosaurus. Many stegosaurs have been found in this part of the formation, including Chialingosaurus, Chungkingosaurus, Gigantspinosaurus, and Tuojiangosaurus. Other dinosaurs discovered include sauropods (Daanosaurus, Mamenchisaurus spp., Omeisaurus spp., and Zigongosaurus), theropods (Chienkosaurus, Sinraptor (Yangchuanosaurus) hepingensis, Szechuanosaurus, and Yangchuanosaurus shangyouensis), and neornithischians (Gongbusaurus and Yandusaurus). The non-dinosaurian fauna includes several turtle species, crocodyliforms (Sichuanosuchus, Peipehsuchus, and Hsisosuchus spp.), therapsids (Bienotheroides and Shunotherium), and fish (Chungkingichthys and Ceratodus spp.).

The lower layers of the formation, which date to older ages, have also yielded a similar dinosaur fauna, including the stegosaurs Bashanosaurus and Huayangosaurus and various sauropods, theropods, basal ornithischians.

== See also ==
- Timeline of stegosaur research
- 1994 in paleontology
