= Zigong Dinosaur Museum =

Coordinates: 29°23′56″N 104°49′34″E

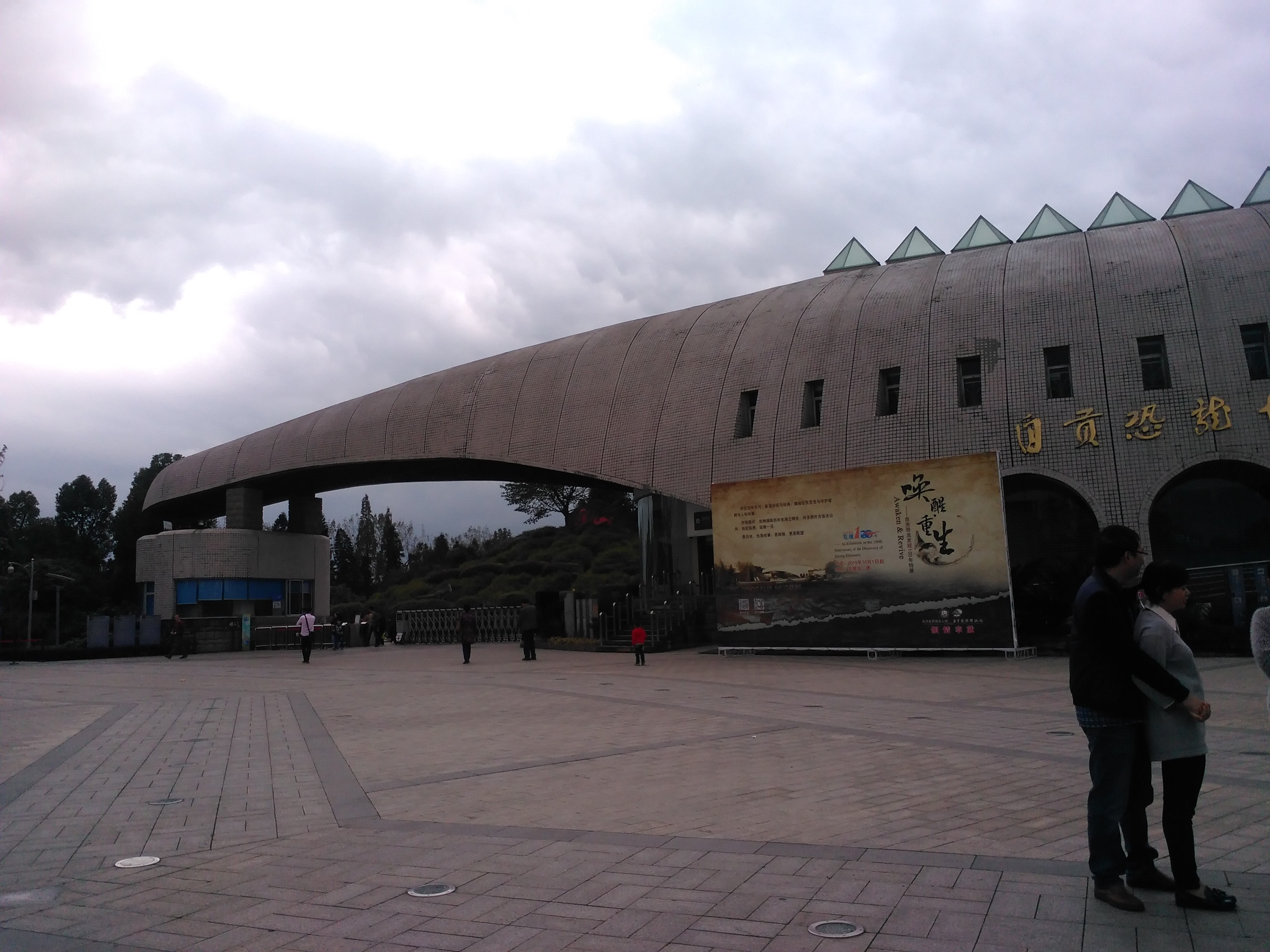
- Established: 1987
- Location: Zigong, Sichuan
- Type: Natural History Museum

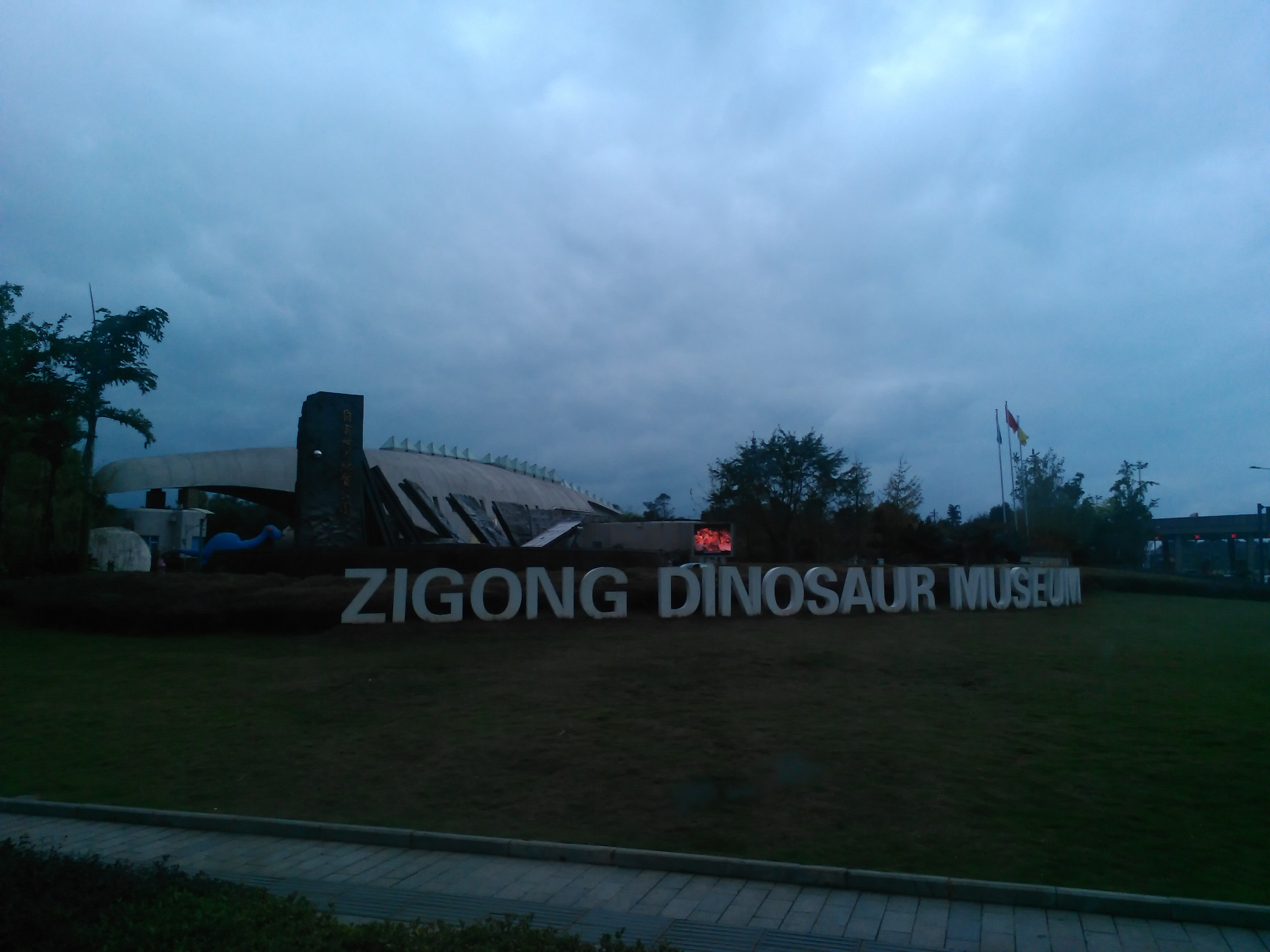
Main entrance

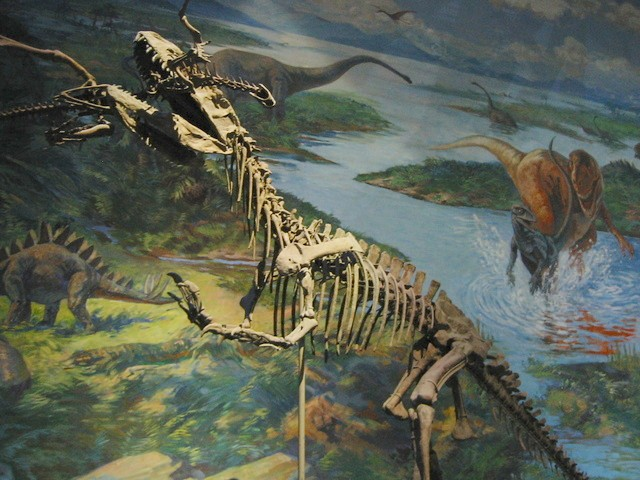
Yangchuanosaurus at the Zigong Dinosaur Museum

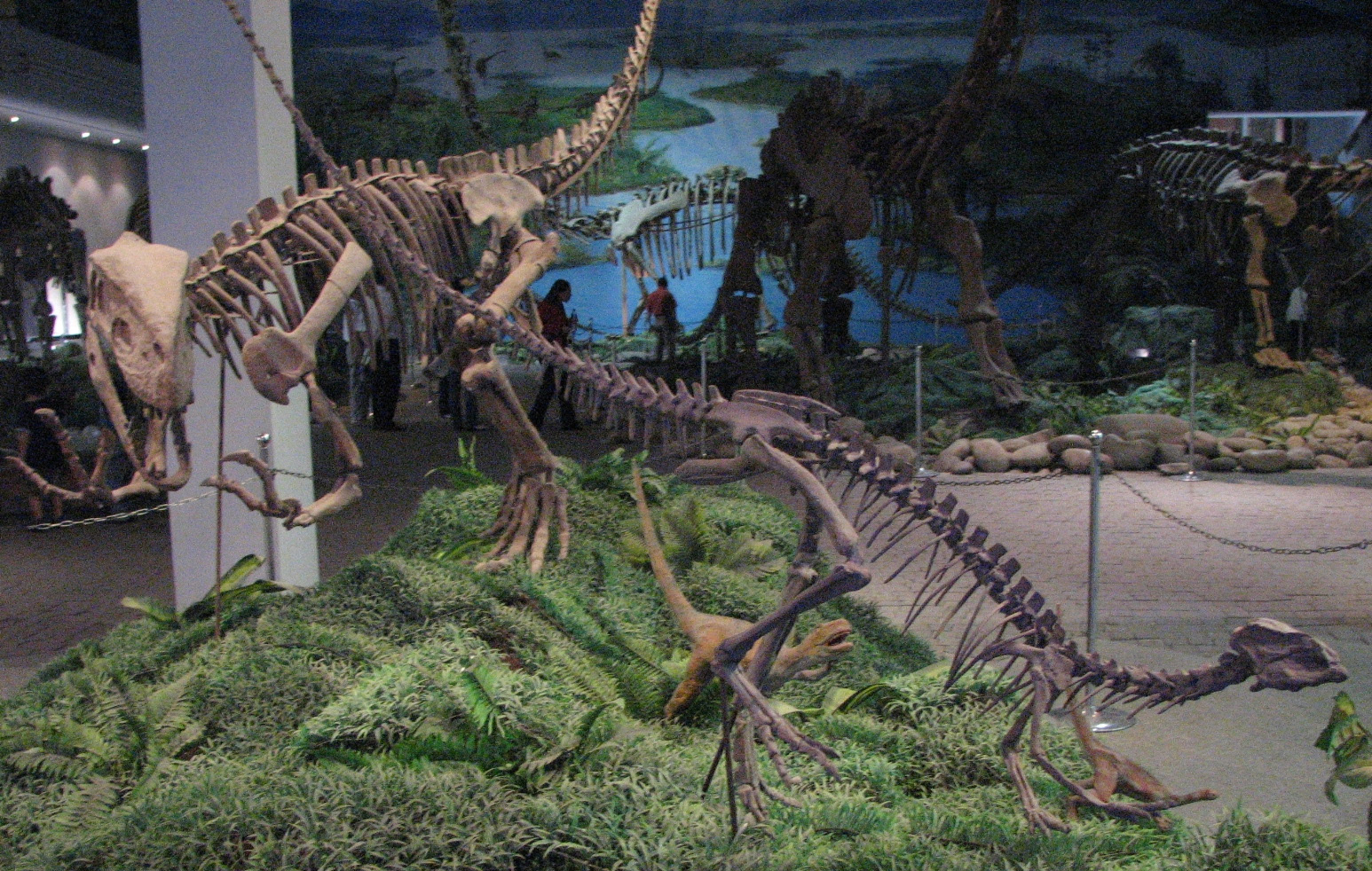
Dinosaurs at the Zigong Dinosaur Museum

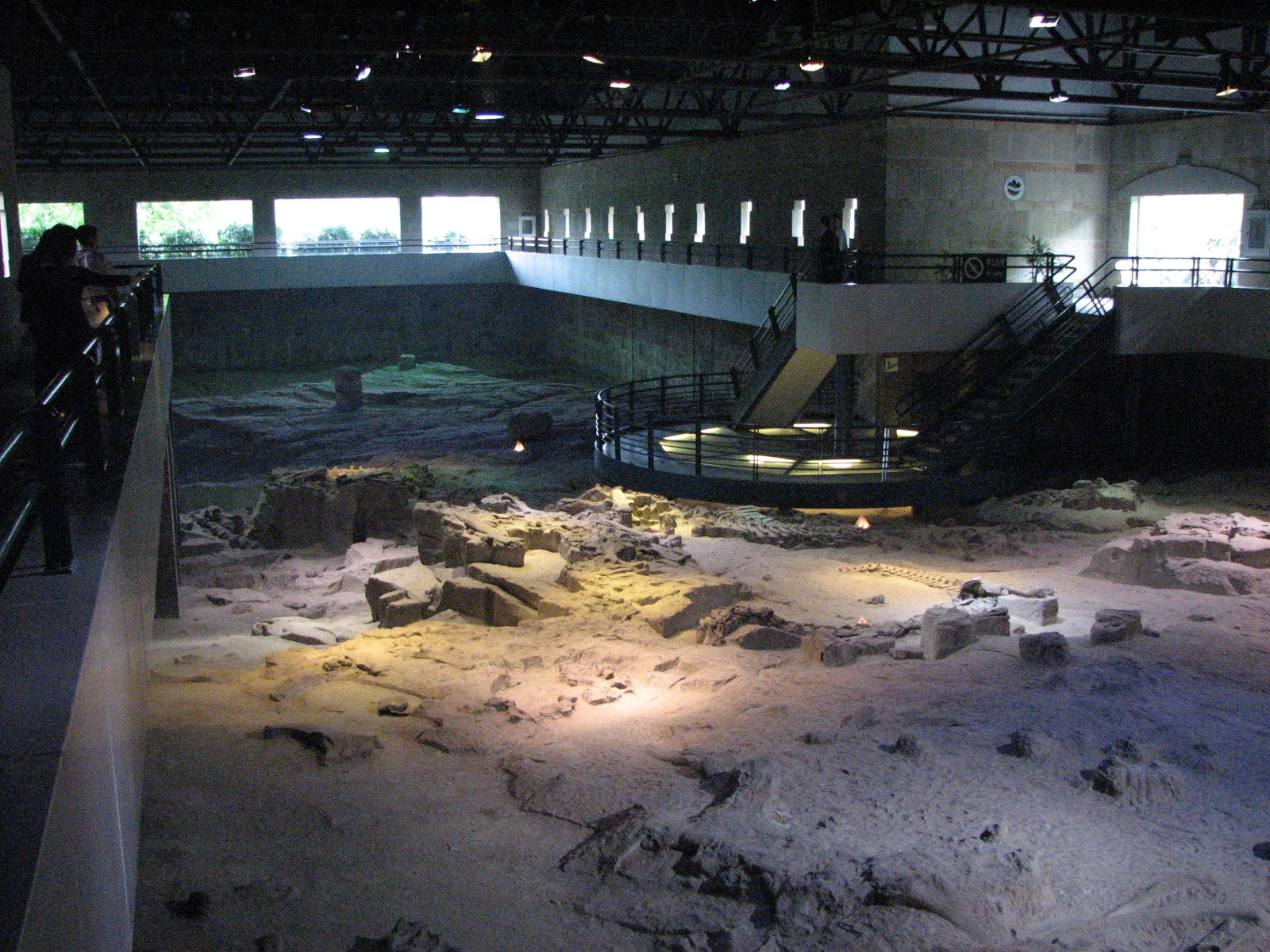
One of the excavation pits of the Zigong Dinosaur Museum

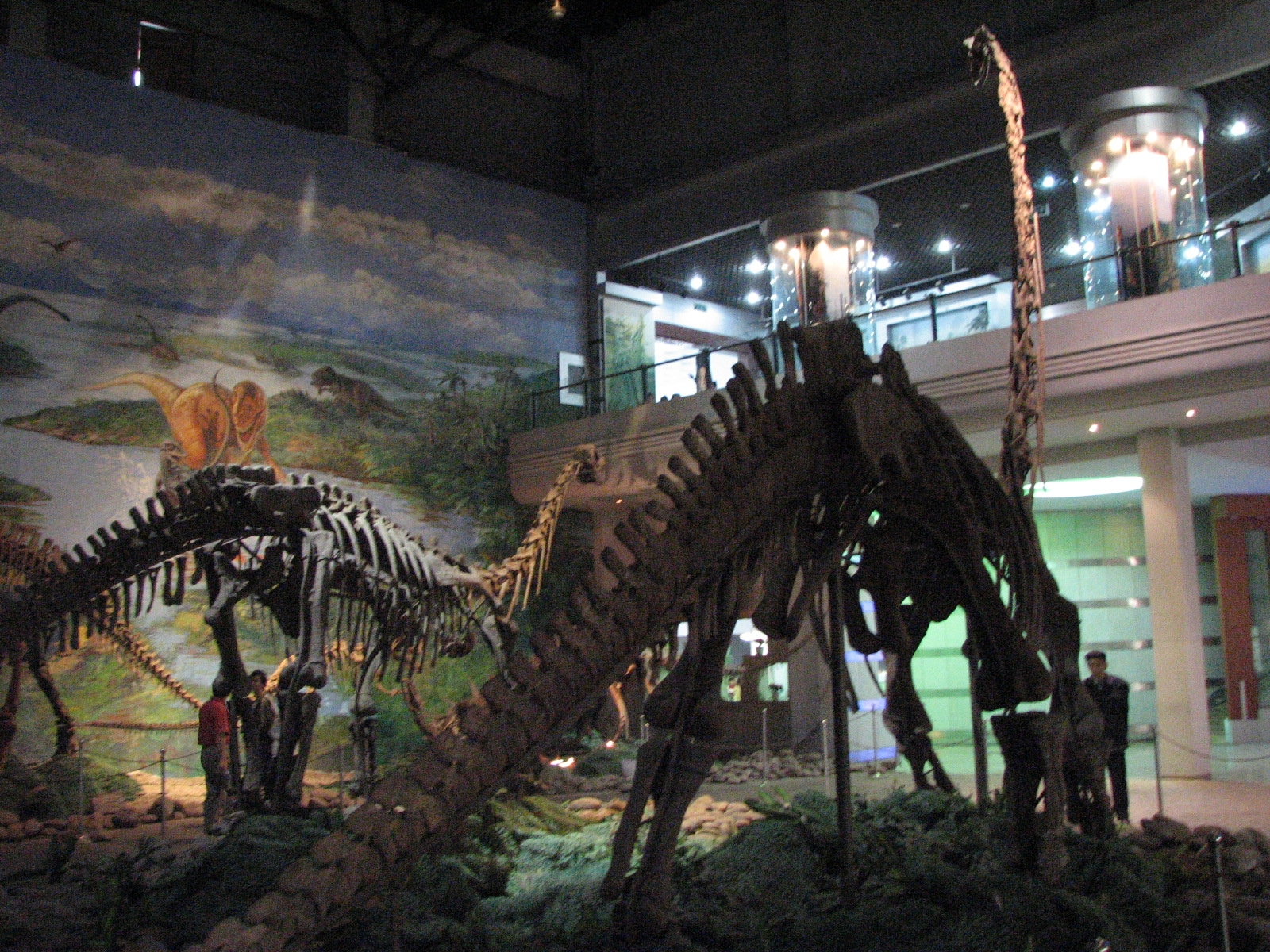
Mamenchisaurus youngi, Zigong Dinosaur Museum

The Zigong Dinosaur Museum (simplified Chinese: 自贡恐龙博物馆; traditional Chinese: 自貢恐龍博物館; pinyin: Zìgòng Kǒnglóng Bówùguǎn) is located near the city of Zigong, Sichuan, China, in the township of Dashanpu.

== History ==
The museum sits on top of a large concentration of a diverse dinosaur assemblage from the Shaximiao Formation. The museum claims the largest number of dinosaur fossils in the world and covers 25,000 square meters with a display area of 3,600 square meters. It attracts up to seven million visitors a year.

In 1980s, vast quantities of dinosaur fossils were excavated in the Middle Jurassic Shaximiao Formation, 7 km north-east from downtown Zigong, including a dinosaur named after the township, Dashanpusaurus. Because of the unique and articulated (intact) bone remains, Zigong is important to paleontologists and dinosaur enthusiasts. The Zigong Dinosaur Museum was established in 1987, becoming the first museum based almost entirely on dinosaurs in Asia. Mounted specimens include Omeisaurus, Gigantspinosaurus, Yangchuanosaurus, Huayangosaurus and Xiaosaurus.

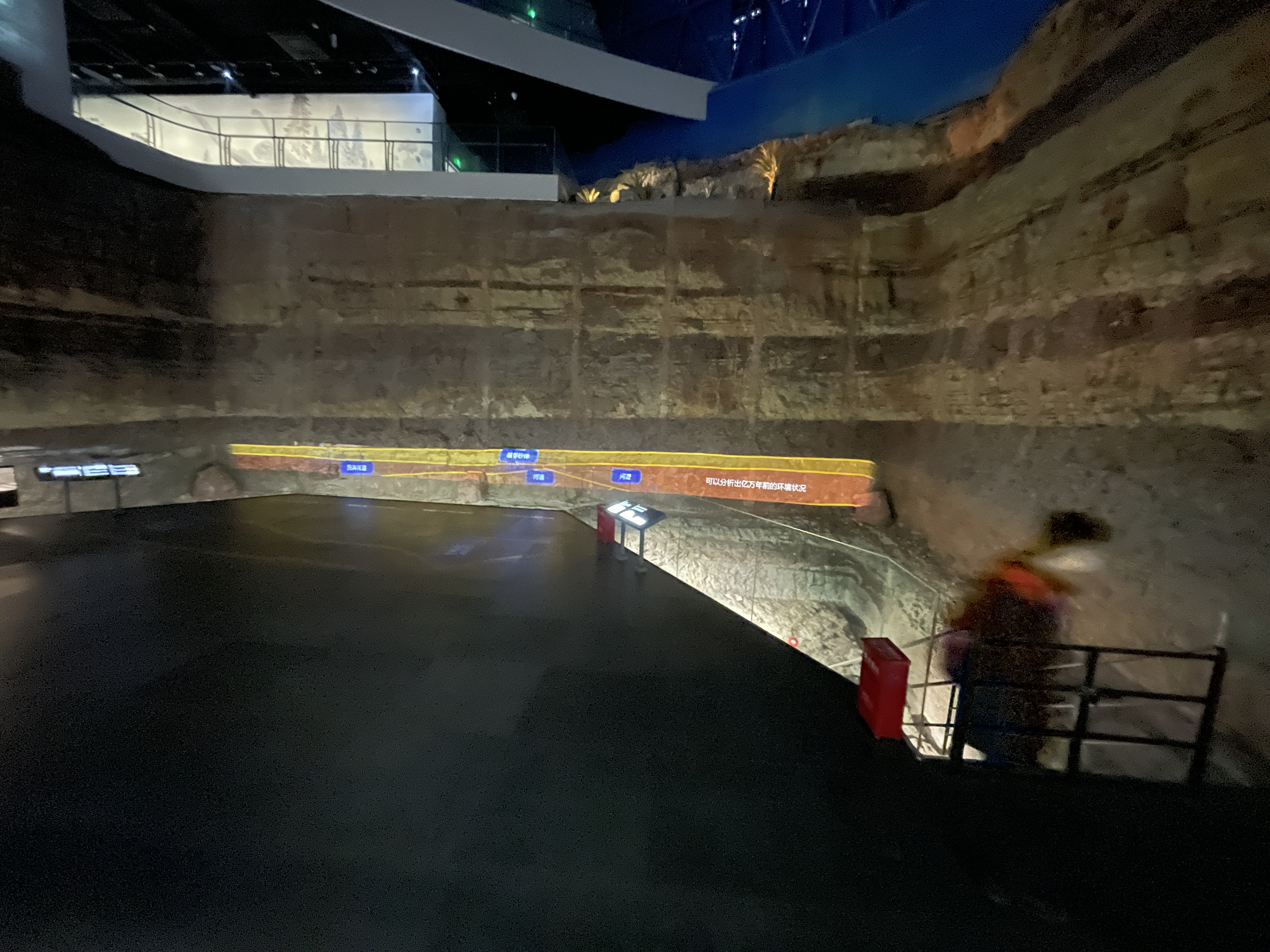
Interior of the second building of ZDM showing stratigraphic composition of the area

During 2011, plans for a second minor building (simplified Chinese: 恐龙探秘馆) of the museum were made with the excavation of some Omeisaurus jiaoi specimens from Jurassic sediments above that of the original main building. Construction of the second building concluded in 2023, within it holds displays of dinosaurs from other parts of China, the original burial site of Omeisaurus jiaoi (ZDM 5050) specimens and a cross-section of the local stratigraphy.

The second building serves to provide basic information and introduce the history of paleontology to the general public. It showcases a vast range of specimens across the globe ranging from dinosaur eggs, rock specimens to casts of Tyrannosaurus skulls and feathered dinosaurs.

== See also ==
- List of museums in China
