= Bashunosaurus =

Bashunosaurus Temporal range: Middle Jurassic, 166–162 Ma
- Skeletal mount at the Chengdu University of Technology Museum

Scientific classification
- Kingdom: Animalia
- Phylum: Chordata
- Class: Reptilia
- Clade: Dinosauria
- Clade: Saurischia
- Clade: †Sauropodomorpha
- Clade: †Sauropoda
- Clade: †Eusauropoda
- Clade: †Macronaria (?)
- Genus: †Bashunosaurus; Kuang, 2004
- Species: †B. kaijiangensis

Binomial name
- †Bashunosaurus kaijiangensis Kuang, 2004

Extinct species of reptile

Bashunosaurus is a genus of potentially macronarian sauropod dinosaur from the Middle Jurassic Shaximiao Formation of Kaijiang, China. The type and only species is Bashunosaurus kaijiangensis.

== Discovery ==
The holotype of Bashunosaurus, KM 20100, was discovered in sediments of the lower Shaximiao Formation in Maanping, Sichuan Province, China. It consists of six cervical vertebrae, eight dorsal vertebrae, a partial left scapula, and a right humerus, ulna, ilium, femur, tibia, and fibula. An additional right ilium, specimen KM 20103, was assigned as a paratype.

== History ==
The name "Bashunosaurus kaijiangensis" first appeared in Ouyang's description of Abrosaurus in 1989, although without a description or diagnosis, making it a nomen nudum (i.e. a nickname that is unavailable for use as an actual scientific name). Li et al. (1999), however, attribute the naming to "Kuang, 1996", still considering it a nomen nudum. Although it was finally formally named by Kuang in 2004, George Olshevsky's influential online Dinosaur Genera List continued to list it as a nomen nudum and possible synonym of Datousaurus. It was largely ignored in modern literature until Dai et al.'s description of Yuzhoulong in 2022, where it is discussed.

== Description ==
As a sauropod, Bashunosaurus would have been a large quadrupedal herbivore with a robust body. Kuang (2004) estimated its length as about 10–12 m (32.8–39.4 ft).

== Classification ==
The precise classification of Bashunosaurus is unknown, with different authors proposing different ideas. Li et al. (1999) consider it a camarasaurid, while Kuang (2004) gives a more precise position in the Camarasaurinae, more derived than Abrosaurus but more basal than Camarasaurus. Molina-Perez and Larramendi (2020) list it as a primitive neosauropod similar to Bellusaurus, Daanosaurus, Dashanpusaurus and Klamelisaurus, although they comment that it is also "similar to Abrosaurus and Datousaurus". Dai et al. (2022) compare the taxon to Yuzhoulong, noting the fact it was described as a macronarian, although they caution that a reappraisal is needed to confirm this in a cladistic context.
