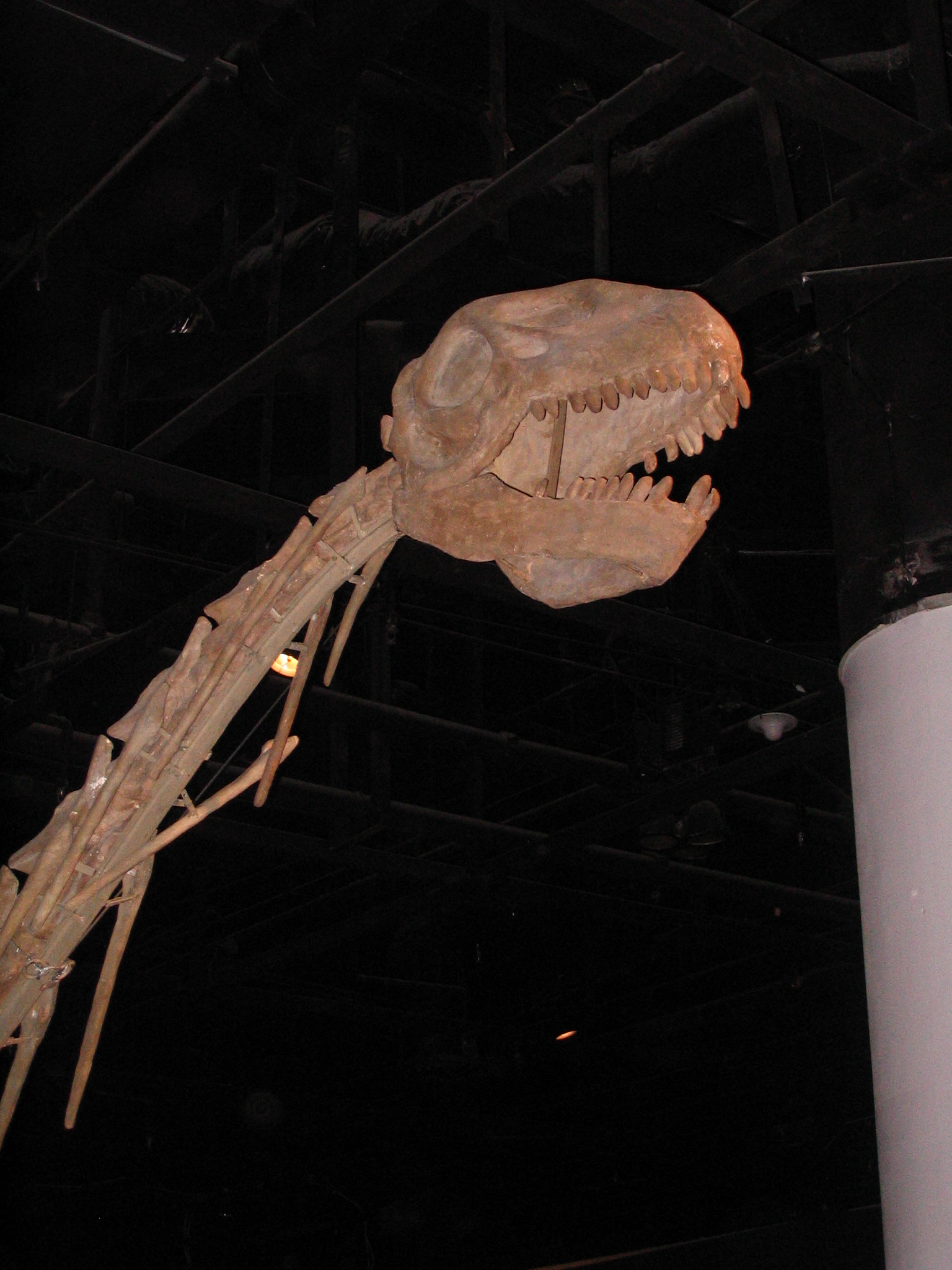
- Reconstructed skeleton

Scientific classification
- Kingdom: Animalia
- Phylum: Chordata
- Class: Reptilia
- Clade: Dinosauria
- Clade: Saurischia
- Clade: †Sauropodomorpha
- Clade: †Sauropoda
- Family: †Mamenchisauridae
- Genus: †Datousaurus; Dong & Tang, 1984
- Species: †D. bashanensis

Binomial name
- †Datousaurus bashanensis Dong & Tang, 1984

= Datousaurus =

Datousaurus Temporal range: Middle Jurassic, 166–162 Ma

Extinct species of reptile

Datousaurus (meaning "chieftain lizard" or "big-head lizard"; originally named using the Malay datu, after its Chinese nickname qiulong - literally "chieftain dragon" - but also a pun on its big head; da tou means "big head" in Chinese) is a sauropod dinosaur from the Middle Jurassic Lower Shaximiao Formation in Sichuan province, China. It shared the local Middle Jurassic landscape with other sauropods such as Shunosaurus, Omeisaurus, and Protognathosaurus, the neornithischian Xiaosaurus, and the early stegosaur Huayangosaurus as well as the carnivorous Gasosaurus.

== Discovery and species ==
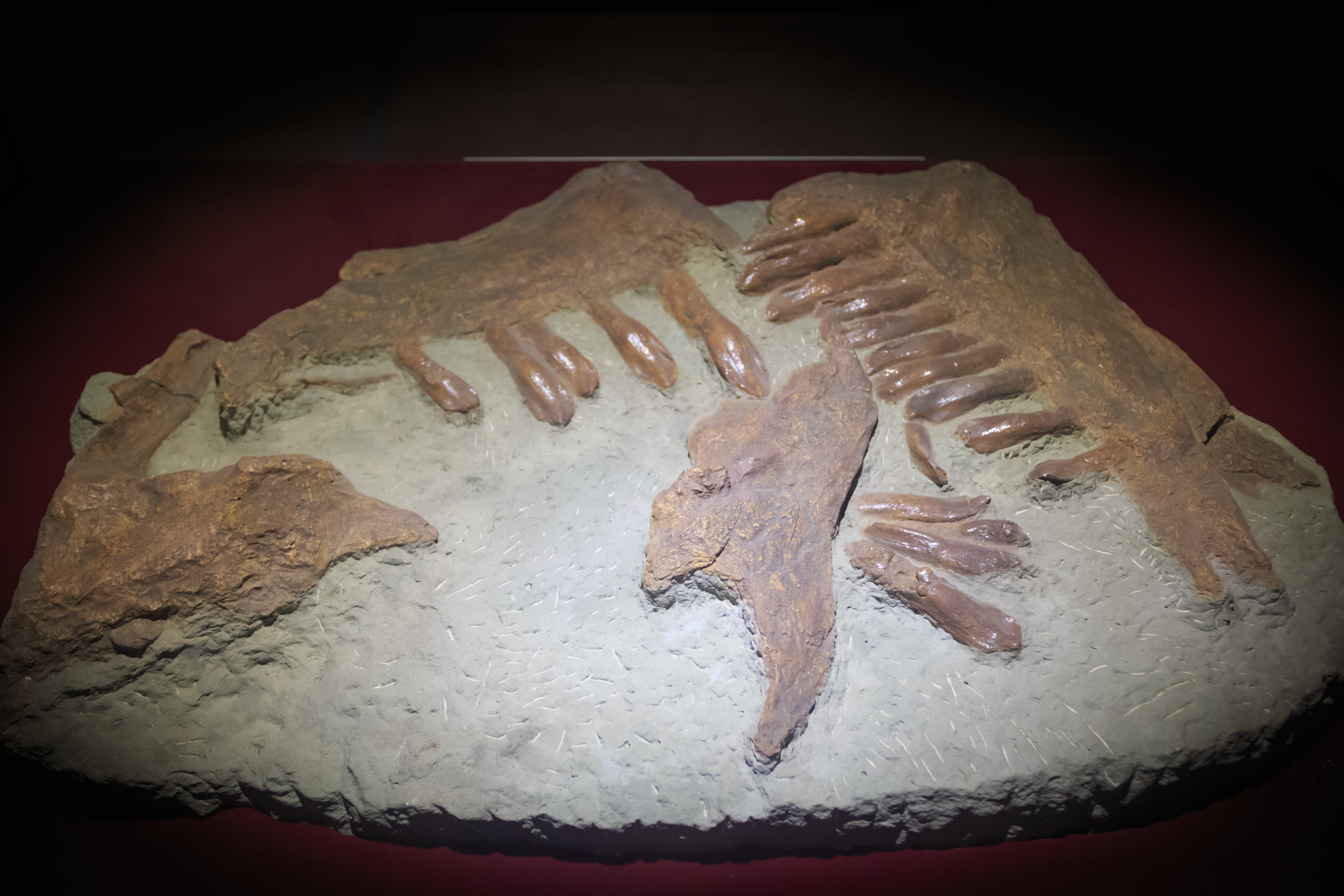
Jaws and teeth

Datousaurus was named by Dong Zhiming and Tang Zilu in 1984. To date, only two partial skeletons have been discovered. Neither had an articulated skull, although one skull has been discovered that has been attributed to the genus.

D. bashanensis is the only established species. The species epithet refers to the discovery of the species in Sichuan; it is derived from "the mountains of Ba and rivers of Shu" (Chinese: 巴山蜀水; pinyin: Bā shān Shǔ shuǐ), a popular way of poetically referring to the landscape of Sichuan.

== Paleobiology ==
Scale diagram of Datousaurus

Datousaurus was about 10-13.9 meters long and herbivorous.It had a deep large skull for a sauropod. The rarity of its fossils suggest that it may not have been as social as other sauropods, which are often preserved in large numbers in a single deposit.

=== Datousaurus and Shunosaurus ===
Datousaurus and Shunosaurus were both closely related animals with similar anatomies. However, Datousaurus's elongated vertebrae gave it a higher reach and its teeth were more spoon shaped. This may be a sign that these contemporaries fed on different plants and/or at different heights in the trees. This strategy may have reduced competition between the two genera. A similar pattern of height difference possibly associated with feeding behaviors is found in the diplodocids.
