= Shaximiao Formation =

Late Jurassic geological formation in China

- Stratigraphic range: Middle Jurassic–Late Jurassic
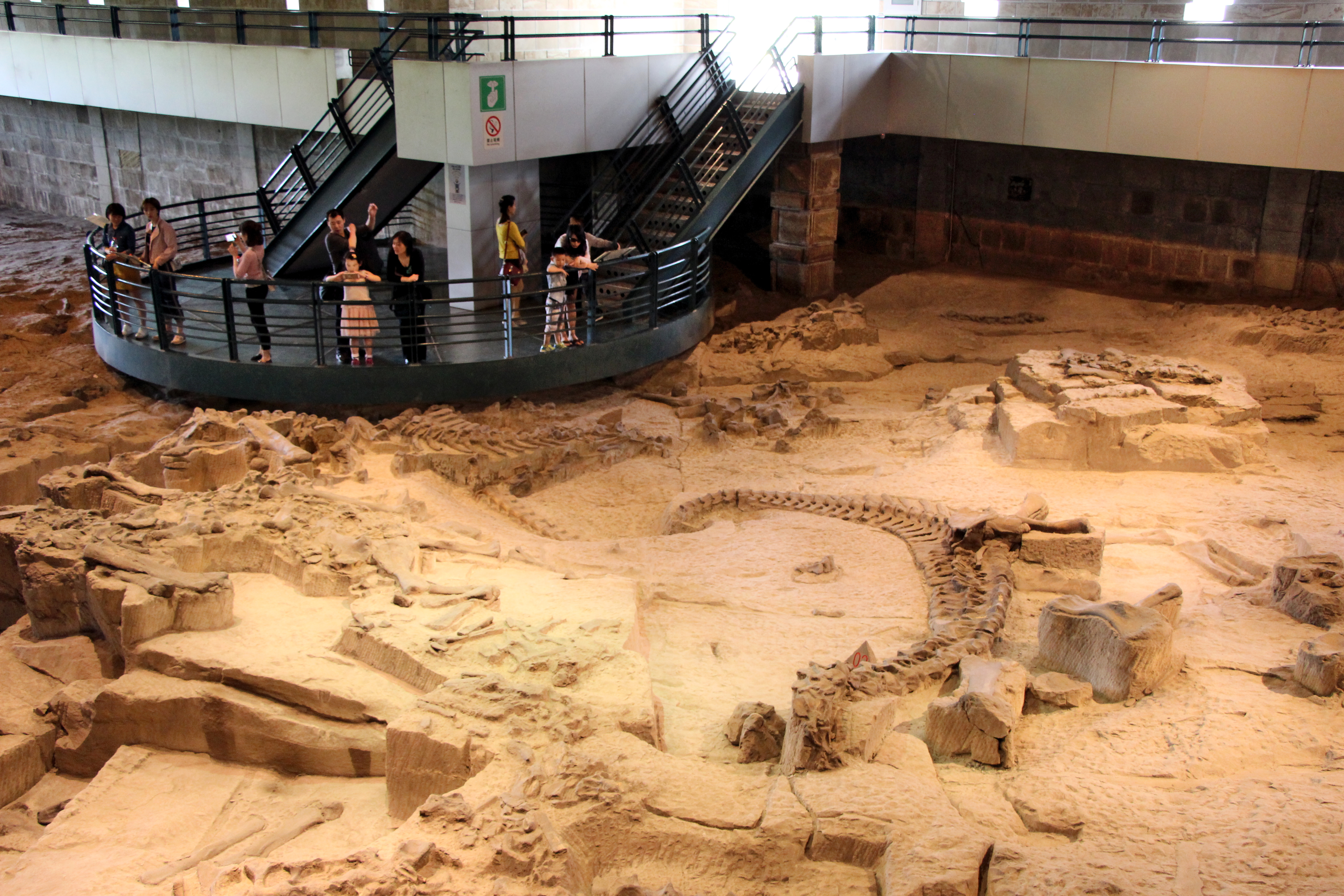
- Excavation floor at the Zigong Dinosaur Museum
- Type: Geological formation
- Unit of: Chongqing Group
- Sub-units: Lower, Upper Subunits
- Underlies: Suining Formation
- Overlies: Xintiangou Formation
- Thickness: Lower Subunit: Up to 246.5 m (809 ft); Upper Subunit: 450–1,200 m (1,480–3,940 ft)

Lithology
- Primary: Sandstone
- Other: Siltstone, mudstone

Location
- Coordinates: 29.2°N 105.9°E
- Approximate paleocoordinates: 28.2°N 110.0°E
- Region: Sichuan
- Country: China
- Extent: Sichuan Basin
- Shaximiao Formation (China) Shaximiao Formation (Sichuan)

The Shaximiao Formation (simplified Chinese: 沙溪庙组; traditional Chinese: 沙溪廟組 / 沙溪廟層; pinyin: Shāxīmiào zǔ) is a Middle to Late Jurassic aged geological formation in Sichuan, China, most notable for the wealth of dinosaurs fossils that have been excavated from its strata. The Shaximiao Formation is exposed in and around the small township of Dashanpu (simplified Chinese: 大山铺镇; traditional Chinese: 大山鋪鎮; pinyin: Dàshānpū zhèn), situated seven kilometres north-east from Sichuan's third largest city, Zigong, in the Da'an District.

== Geology ==
The Shaximiao Formation includes two distinct subunits: The upper and lower Shaximiao Formations (simplified Chinese: 上·下沙溪庙地层; traditional Chinese: 上·下沙溪廟地層; pinyin: shàng / xià Shāxīmiào dìcéng), although they are commonly referred to as one, simply being called the "Shaximiao Formation". The upper Shaximiao Formation is also known as the Shangshaximiao Formation, and the lower Shaximiao Formation is also known as the Xiashaximiao Formation, which are direct transliterations of the Chinese names. Both subunits primarily consist of purple-red mudstones, with variable sand inclusion. and siltstones with interbedded sandstones.

== Dinosaur finds ==
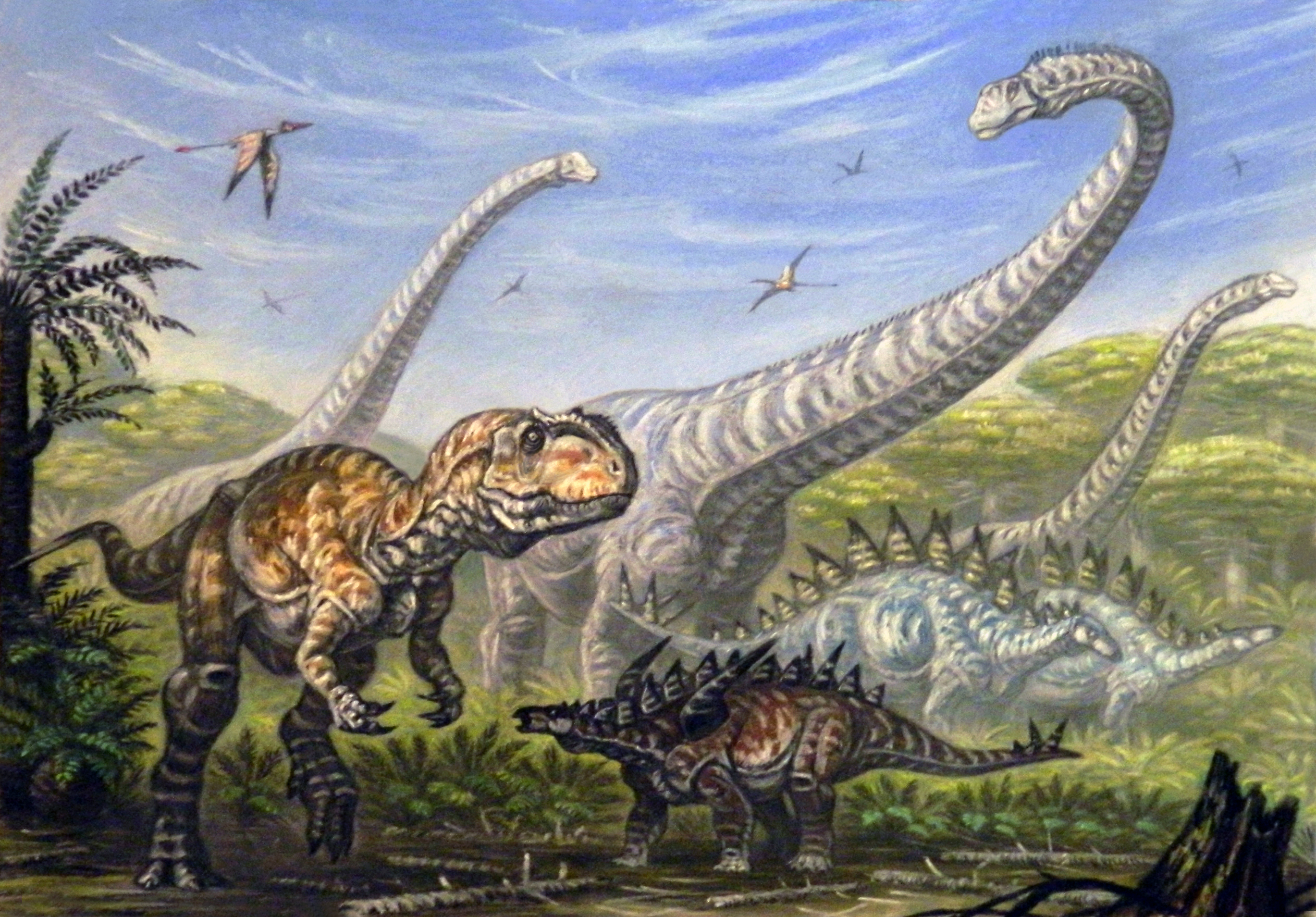
Dinosaurs of the Shaximiao Formation

The Shaximiao Formation has produced mainly sauropods, but has also held numerous other dinosaur types, such as theropods and stegosaurians amongst others. In total, over 8,000 pieces of bone have been unearthed from the area – amounting to nearly 40 tonnes. The site was unknown until the early 1970s, when a Chinese gas company unearthed Gasosaurus in 1972. It would be the first of the many dinosaurs to be uncovered from the area. Most specimens found are held at the Zigong Dinosaur Museum which has been placed on the area during the mid-1980s.

The site is currently a frequented "dinosaur-quarry", but the Shaximiao Formation once hosted a lush forest, evidenced by fossilised wood found alongside the dinosaur remains. Paleontologists speculate that the area also had a lake that was fed by a large river. Dinosaur remains would have been swept toward the lake over millions of years, thus accounting for the hundreds of specimens found. Based on biostratigraphy, the Lower Shaximiao Formation has been usually seen to date to 168 to 161 million years old, between the Bathonian to Callovian stages of the Mid Jurassic, while the Upper Shaximiao was thought to be Oxfordian in age. A paper by Wang et al. (2018), (recalibrated dates reported in Moore et al. (2020)), reported a zircon U-Pb age of 160.4 ± 0.4 mya for the lower part of the Shaximiao Formation, suggesting that the Shaximiao Formation is younger than previously thought. Contradicting this, U-Pb dates from a tuff bed supports traditional Middle Jurassic age for the lower part of the formation, with an average age of around 166.0 ± 1.5 Ma. The top of the Shaximiao Formation has been believed to be the end of the Tithonian age.

== Dong Zhiming's research ==
The paleontologist who has made the largest contribution to the formation and its excavation is Dong Zhiming. He first examined the formation in 1975, after bone fragments were found embedded in rock from the area. The site was being demolished to make way for both a natural gas field facility and a vehicle park when Dong first saw the area. Amongst the extensive clearings, Dong found numerous bone fragments which were exposed.

However, the specimens were being damaged due to bulldozers in the area and there would be little chance of closing the area as the state had invested millions of yuan in the site already. It was not until 1985 that the government finally agreed to close the construction on the site, and by then Dong and his team had already excavated over 100 dinosaurs from the area, including several rare sauropod skulls. A dinosaur found in the Shaximiao Formation, Dashanpusaurus dongi, was named in tribute of both Dashanpu and Dong Zhiming.

== Paleobiota ==
In addition to dinosaur finds, many other prehistoric finds have been uncovered from the Shaximiao Formation. Amongst these finds are fishes, amphibians, turtles, marine reptiles such as crocodiles and also pterosaurs. Bienotheroides, a Tritylodont Synapsid has been found there, as well as Sinobrachyops, a Labyrinthodont.

=== Amphibians ===
Color key: Taxon / Reclassified taxon / Taxon falsely reported as present / Dubious taxon or junior synonym / Ichnotaxon / Ootaxon / Morphotaxon	Notes; Uncertain or tentative taxa are in small text; ~~crossed out~~ taxa are discredited.

Genus	Species	Stratigraphic position	Material	Notes	Images
Sinobrachyops	S. placenticephalus	Shunosaurus-Omeisaurus assemblage, Lower Shaximiao Formation		A brachyopid stereospondyl	

=== Fish ===
Color key: Taxon / Reclassified taxon / Taxon falsely reported as present / Dubious taxon or junior synonym / Ichnotaxon / Ootaxon / Morphotaxon	Notes; Uncertain or tentative taxa are in small text; ~~crossed out~~ taxa are discredited.

Genus	Species	Stratigraphic position	Material	Notes	Images
Ceratodus	C. guanganensis	Mamenchisaurus assemblage, Upper Shaximiao Formation		A ceratodontid lungfish	
Ceratodus	C. minor	Mamenchisaurus assemblage, Upper Shaximiao Formation		A ceratodontid lungfish	
Ceratodus	C. youngi	Mamenchisaurus assemblage, Upper Shaximiao Formation		A ceratodontid lungfish	
Ceratodus	C. zigongensis	Mamenchisaurus assemblage, Upper Shaximiao Formation, Shunosaurus-Omeisaurus assemblage, Lower Shaximiao Formation		A ceratodontid lungfish	
Chungkingichthys	C. tachuensis	Mamenchisaurus assemblage, Upper Shaximiao Formation		A ptycholepiform fish	
Hybodus	H. sp.	Shunosaurus-Omeisaurus assemblage, Lower Shaximiao Formation		A hybodont chondrichthyan	
Isanichthys	I. luchowensis	Shunosaurus-Omeisaurus assemblage, Lower Shaximiao Formation		A ginglymodian fish, originally identified as Lepidotes	
Yuchoulepis	Y. szechuanensis	Shunosaurus-Omeisaurus assemblage, Lower Shaximiao Formation		A ptycholepiform fish	

=== Sauropterygians ===
Color key: Taxon / Reclassified taxon / Taxon falsely reported as present / Dubious taxon or junior synonym / Ichnotaxon / Ootaxon / Morphotaxon	Notes; Uncertain or tentative taxa are in small text; ~~crossed out~~ taxa are discredited.

Genus	Species	Stratigraphic position	Material	Notes	Images
Bishanopliosaurus	B. zigongensis	Shunosaurus-Omeisaurus assemblage, Lower Shaximiao Formation		A pliosauroid plesiosaur	

=== Crocodyliformes ===
Color key: Taxon / Reclassified taxon / Taxon falsely reported as present / Dubious taxon or junior synonym / Ichnotaxon / Ootaxon / Morphotaxon	Notes; Uncertain or tentative taxa are in small text; ~~crossed out~~ taxa are discredited.

Genus	Species	Stratigraphic position	Material	Notes	Images
Sunosuchus	S. shunanensis	Shunosaurus-Omeisaurus assemblage, Lower Shaximiao Formation		A goniopholidid	
Hsisosuchus	H. dashanpuensis	Shunosaurus-Omeisaurus assemblage, Lower Shaximiao Formation		A goniopholid	

=== Pterosaurs ===
Genus	Species	Stratigraphic position	Material	Notes	Images
Angustinaripterus	A. longicephalus	Shunosaurus-Omeisaurus assemblage, Lower Shaximiao Formation		A rhamphorhynchine rhamphorhynchid with a very elongated and flat snout and an estimated wingspan at 1.6 metres (5.2 ft)	

=== Dinosaurs ===
Color key: Taxon / Reclassified taxon / Taxon falsely reported as present / Dubious taxon or junior synonym / Ichnotaxon / Ootaxon / Morphotaxon	Notes; Uncertain or tentative taxa are in small text; ~~crossed out~~ taxa are discredited.

==== Ornithischians ====
===== Neornithischians =====
Genus	Species	Stratigraphic position	Material	Notes	Images
Agilisaurus	A. louderbacki	Shunosaurus-Omeisaurus assemblage, Lower Shaximiao Formation			
Gongbusaurus	G. shiyii	Mamenchisaurus assemblage, Upper Shaximiao Formation	Teeth		
Hexinlusaurus	H. multidens	Shunosaurus-Omeisaurus assemblage, Lower Shaximiao Formation			
Xiaosaurus	X. dashanpuensis	Shunosaurus-Omeisaurus assemblage, Lower Shaximiao Formation			
Yandusaurus	Y. hongheensis	Mamenchisaurus assemblage, Upper Shaximiao Formation			

===== Stegosaurs =====
Color key: Taxon / Reclassified taxon / Taxon falsely reported as present / Dubious taxon or junior synonym / Ichnotaxon / Ootaxon / Morphotaxon	Notes; Uncertain or tentative taxa are in small text; ~~crossed out~~ taxa are discredited.

Genus	Species	Stratigraphic position	Material	Notes	Images
Bashanosaurus	B. primitivus	Lower Shaximiao Formation		The earliest-diverging stegosaur currently known; it shares features with basal thyreophorans and derived stegosaurs.	
Chialingosaurus	C. kuani	Mamenchisaurus assemblage, Upper Shaximiao Formation		A stegosaurian.	
Chungkingosaurus	C. jiangbeiensis	Mamenchisaurus assemblage, Upper Shaximiao Formation		A stegosaurian.	
Huayangosaurus	H. taibaii	Shunosaurus-Omeisaurus assemblage, Lower Shaximiao Formation		A huayangosaurid with more spike-like plates than Stegosaurus. It was also one of the smallest known stegosaurs, at just 4.5 meters (15 feet) in length.	
Gigantspinosaurus	G. sichuanensis	Mamenchisaurus assemblage, Upper Shaximiao Formation		A stegosaurian.	
Gigantspinosaurus	G. sp.	Mamenchisaurus assemblage, Upper Shaximiao Formation		A stegosaurian.	
Tuojiangosaurus	T. multispinus	Mamenchisaurus assemblage, Upper Shaximiao Formation		A stegosaurian.	
Yingshanosaurus	Y. jichuanensis	Upper Shaximiao Formation	Nearly complete skeleton	A stegosaurian.	

==== Sauropods ====
Color key: Taxon / Reclassified taxon / Taxon falsely reported as present / Dubious taxon or junior synonym / Ichnotaxon / Ootaxon / Morphotaxon	Notes; Uncertain or tentative taxa are in small text; ~~crossed out~~ taxa are discredited.

Genus	Species	Stratigraphic position	Material	Notes	Images
Abrosaurus	A. dongpoi	Lower Shaximiao Formation		A macronarian known from a well-preserved skull and other elements.	
Bashunosaurus	B. kaijiangensis	Lower Shaximiao Formation		An obscure possible macronarian	
Daanosaurus	D. zhangi	Mamenchisaurus assemblage, Upper Shaximiao Formation			
Dashanpusaurus	D. dongi	Lower Shaximiao Formation		A basal macronarian	
Datousaurus	D. bashanensis	Shunosaurus-Omeisaurus assemblage, Lower Shaximiao Formation		A mamenchisaurid.	
Mamenchisaurus	M. constructus	Mamenchisaurus assemblage, Upper Shaximiao Formation		A mamenchisaurid.	
Mamenchisaurus	M. hochuanensis	Mamenchisaurus assemblage, Upper Shaximiao Formation		A mamenchisaurid.	
Mamenchisaurus	M. youngi	Mamenchisaurus assemblage, Upper Shaximiao Formation		A mamenchisaurid.	
Mamenchisaurus	M. jingyanensis	Mamenchisaurus assemblage, Upper Shaximiao Formation		A mamenchisaurid.	
Mamenchisaurus	M. sanjiangensis	Upper Shaximiao Formation	A single partial skeleton	A mamenchisaurid.	
Omeisaurus	O. luoquanensis	Shunosaurus-Omeisaurus assemblage, Lower Shaximiao Formation		A mamenchisaurid.	
Omeisaurus	O. tianfuensis	Shunosaurus-Omeisaurus assemblage, Lower Shaximiao Formation		A mamenchisaurid.	
Omeisaurus	O. junghsiensis	Shunosaurus-Omeisaurus assemblage, Lower Shaximiao Formation		A mamenchisaurid.	
Omeisaurus	O. changshouensis	Mamenchisaurus assemblage, Upper Shaximiao Formation		A mamenchisaurid.	
Omeisaurus	O. maoianus	Mamenchisaurus assemblage, Upper Shaximiao Formation		A mamenchisaurid.	
Omeisaurus	O. fuxiensis	Mamenchisaurus assemblage, Upper Shaximiao Formation		A mamenchisaurid.	
Omeisaurus	O. jiaoi			A mamenchisaurid.	
Omeisaurus	O. puxiani			A mamenchisaurid.	
Protognathosaurus	P. oxyodon	Shunosaurus-Omeisaurus assemblage, Lower Shaximiao Formation			
Shunosaurus	S. lii	Shunosaurus-Omeisaurus assemblage, Lower Shaximiao Formation		A eusauropod estimated with a length at 9.5 meters (31 feet), the weight at 3 metric tons (3.3 short tons). The tail ended in a club, equipped on its top with two successive spikes formed by 5 centimetres (2.0 inches)-long cone-shaped osteoderms probably used to fend off enemies.	
Yuzhoulong	Y. qurenensis	Lower Shaximiao Formation		A basal macronarian known from a subadult specimen	
Zigongosaurus	Z. fuxiensis	Mamenchisaurus assemblage, Upper Shaximiao Formation		Possibly a species of Mamenchisaurus.	

==== Theropods ====
Color key: Taxon / Reclassified taxon / Taxon falsely reported as present / Dubious taxon or junior synonym / Ichnotaxon / Ootaxon / Morphotaxon	Notes; Uncertain or tentative taxa are in small text; ~~crossed out~~ taxa are discredited.

Genus	Species	Synonyms	Stratigraphic position	Material	Notes	Images
Chienkosaurus	C. ceratosauroides		Mamenchisaurus assemblage, Upper Shaximiao Formation			
Chuandongocoelurus	C. primitivus		Shunosaurus-Omeisaurus assemblage, Lower Shaximiao Formation			
Elaphrosaurinae indet.			Shunosaurus-Omeisaurus assemblage, Lower Shaximiao Formation		Formerly designated as the paratype of Chuandongocoelurus.	
Gasosaurus	G. constructus		Shunosaurus-Omeisaurus assemblage, Lower Shaximiao Formation		An avetheropod that measured between 3.5 and 4 meters (11 and 13 ft) in length, with a weight of around 150 kilograms (330 pounds). However, some estimates put its weight as high as 400 kilograms (880 pounds), as very little is known about it.	
Kaijiangosaurus	K. lini		Shunosaurus-Omeisaurus assemblage, Lower Shaximiao Formation		A megalosaurid, early tetanuran, early averostran or basal carnosaur.	
Leshansaurus	L. qianweiensis		Shunosaurus-Omeisaurus assemblage, Upper Shaximiao formation		A megalosaurid.	
Sinocoelurus	S. fragilis		Mamenchisaurus assemblage, Upper Shaximiao Formation		A theropod of uncertain affinities	
Sinraptor	S. hepingensis		Mamenchisaurus assemblage, Upper Shaximiao Formation		A metriacanthosaurid, formally named Yangchuanosaurus hepingensis.	
Szechuanosaurus	S. campi		Mamenchisaurus assemblage, Upper Shaximiao Formation		A metriacanthosaurid. Remains from the Shaximiao Formation might represent an indeterminate theropod.	
Xuanhanosaurus	X. qilixiaensis		Shunosaurus-Omeisaurus assemblage, Lower Shaximiao Formation		A metriacanthosaurid.	
Yangchuanosaurus	Y. shangyouensis	Y. magnus	Mamenchisaurus assemblage, Upper Shaximiao formation		A metriacanthosaurid	
Yangchuanosaurus	Y. zigongensis	Szechuanosaurus zigongensis	Shunosaurus-Omeisaurus assemblage, Lower Shaximiao Formation	ZDM 9011 (holotype), a partial postcranial skeleton; ZDM 9012, a left maxilla; ZDM 9013, two teeth and ZDM 9014, a right hind limb.	A metriacanthosaurid	

=== Turtles ===
Color key: Taxon / Reclassified taxon / Taxon falsely reported as present / Dubious taxon or junior synonym / Ichnotaxon / Ootaxon / Morphotaxon	Notes; Uncertain or tentative taxa are in small text; ~~crossed out~~ taxa are discredited.

Genus	Species	Stratigraphic position	Material	Notes	Images
Bashuchelys	B. zigongensis	Shunosaurus-Omeisaurus assemblage, Lower Shaximiao Formation		A bachuchelyid.	
Chengyuchelys	C. baenoides	Shangshaximiao Formation		A xinjiangchelyid.	
Chengyuchelys	C. latimarginalis	Shunosaurus-Omeisaurus assemblage, Lower Shaximiao Formation		A xinjiangchelyid.	
Chuannanchelys	C. dashanpuensis	Shunosaurus-Omeisaurus assemblage, Lower Shaximiao Formation		A bashuchelyid.	
Protoxinjiangchelys	P. salis	Shunosaurus-Omeisaurus assemblage, Lower Shaximiao Formation		A xinjiangchelyid.	
Sichuanchelys	S. chowi	Shunosaurus-Omeisaurus assemblage, Lower Shaximiao Formation		A sichuanchelyid.	
Tienfuchelys	T. zigongensis	Shangshaximiao Formation		A xinjiangchelyid.	
Sinaspideretes	S. wimani	Shangshaximiao Formation		A trionychian, possibly the oldest known cryptodire	

=== Therapsids ===
Color key: Taxon / Reclassified taxon / Taxon falsely reported as present / Dubious taxon or junior synonym / Ichnotaxon / Ootaxon / Morphotaxon	Notes; Uncertain or tentative taxa are in small text; ~~crossed out~~ taxa are discredited.

Genus	Species	Stratigraphic position	Material	Notes	Images
Bienotheroides	B. zigongensis	Shunosaurus-Omeisaurus assemblage, Lower Shaximiao Formation		A tritylodontid.	
Polistodon	P. chuannanensis	Shunosaurus-Omeisaurus assemblage, Lower Shaximiao Formation		A tritylodontid.	
Tritylodontidae	gen. et sp. indet.	Shunosaurus-Omeisaurus assemblage, Lower Shaximiao Formation		An indeterminate tritylodontid.	

=== Plants ===
Color key: Taxon / Reclassified taxon / Taxon falsely reported as present / Dubious taxon or junior synonym / Ichnotaxon / Ootaxon / Morphotaxon	Notes; Uncertain or tentative taxa are in small text; ~~crossed out~~ taxa are discredited.

Genus	Species	Stratigraphic position	Material	Notes
Brachyoxylon	B. qijiangense	Masangyan village	Leaves	Family unknown.

== See also ==
- List of dinosaur-bearing rock formations
