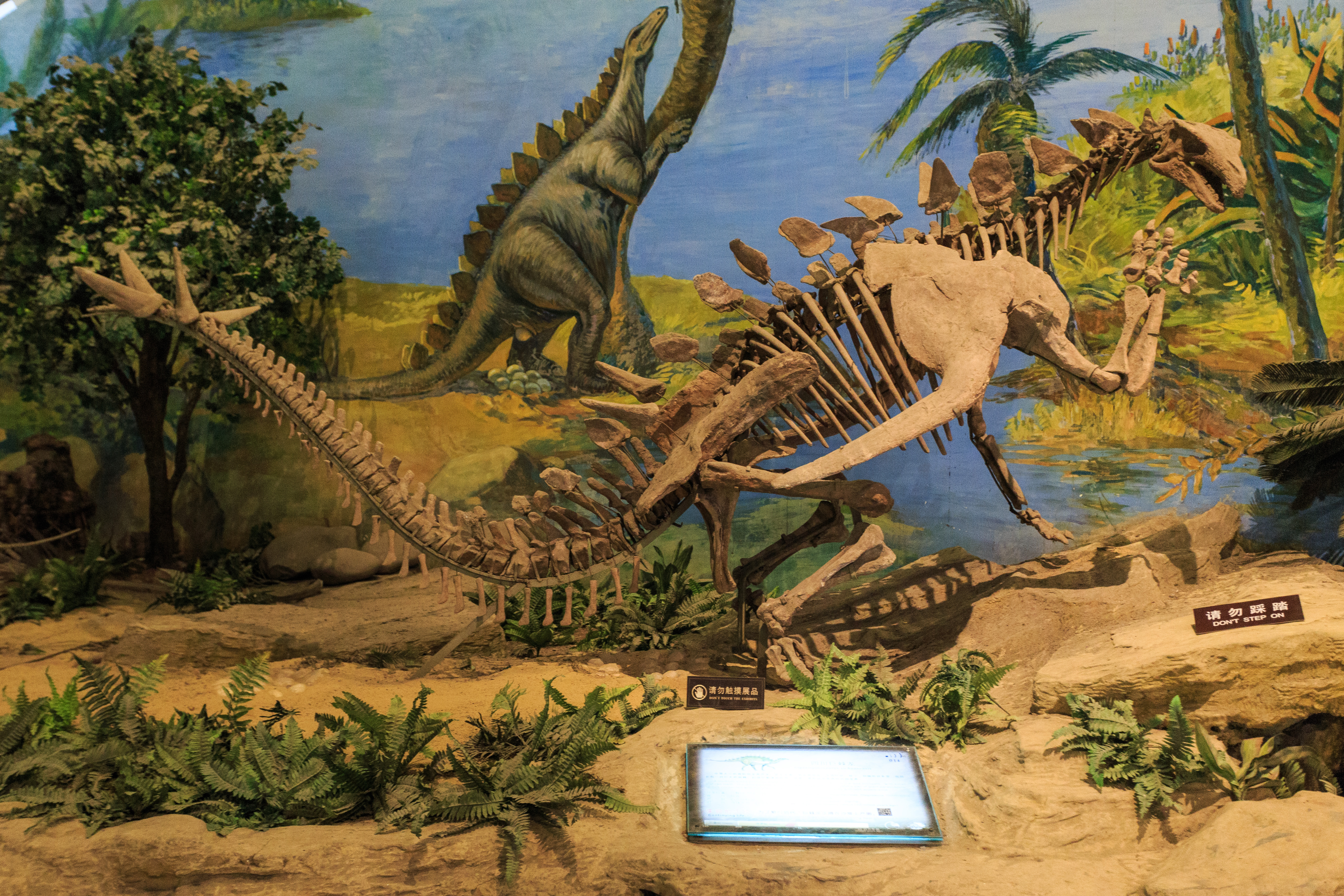
- Skeletal mount of Gigantspinosaurus in the Zigong Dinosaur Museum

Scientific classification
- Kingdom: Animalia
- Phylum: Chordata
- Clade: Dinosauria
- Clade: †Ornithischia
- Clade: †Thyreophora
- Clade: †Stegosauria
- Family: †Huayangosauridae
- Genus: †Gigantspinosaurus; Ouyang, 1992
- Species: †G. sichuanensis

Binomial name
- †Gigantspinosaurus sichuanensis Ouyang, 1992

= Gigantspinosaurus =

Gigantspinosaurus Temporal range: Late Jurassic, 163.5–157.3 Ma Oxfordian record

Extinct genus of dinosaurs

Gigantspinosaurus (lit. 'giant-spined lizard') is a genus of stegosaurian dinosaur from the Late Jurassic (Oxfordian) Upper Shaximiao Formation of China. The type species is Gigantspinosaurus sichuanensis. It was a moderately sized member of the group, measuring up to 4.2 metres (14 ft) in length.

== Discovery ==
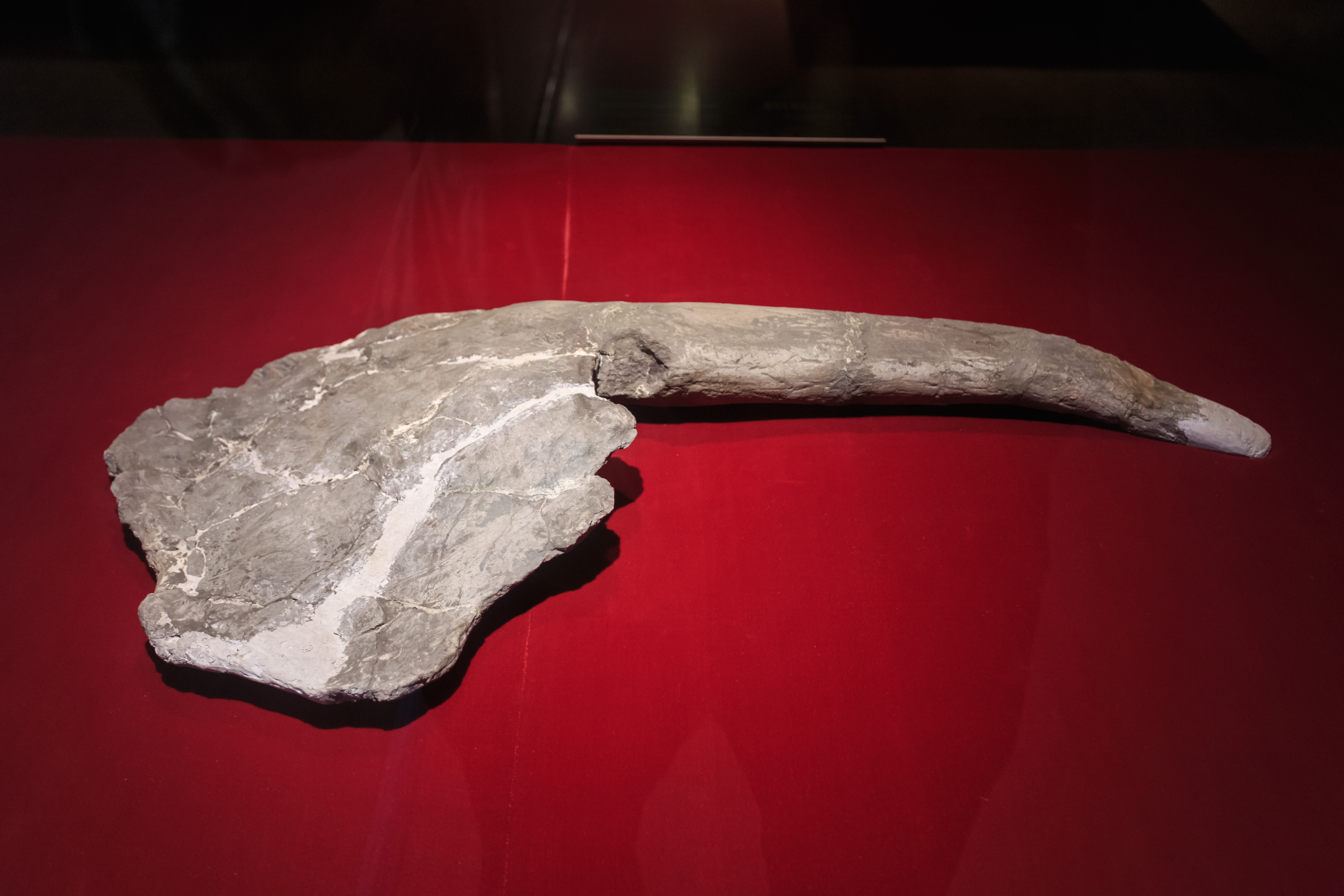
Shoulder spine

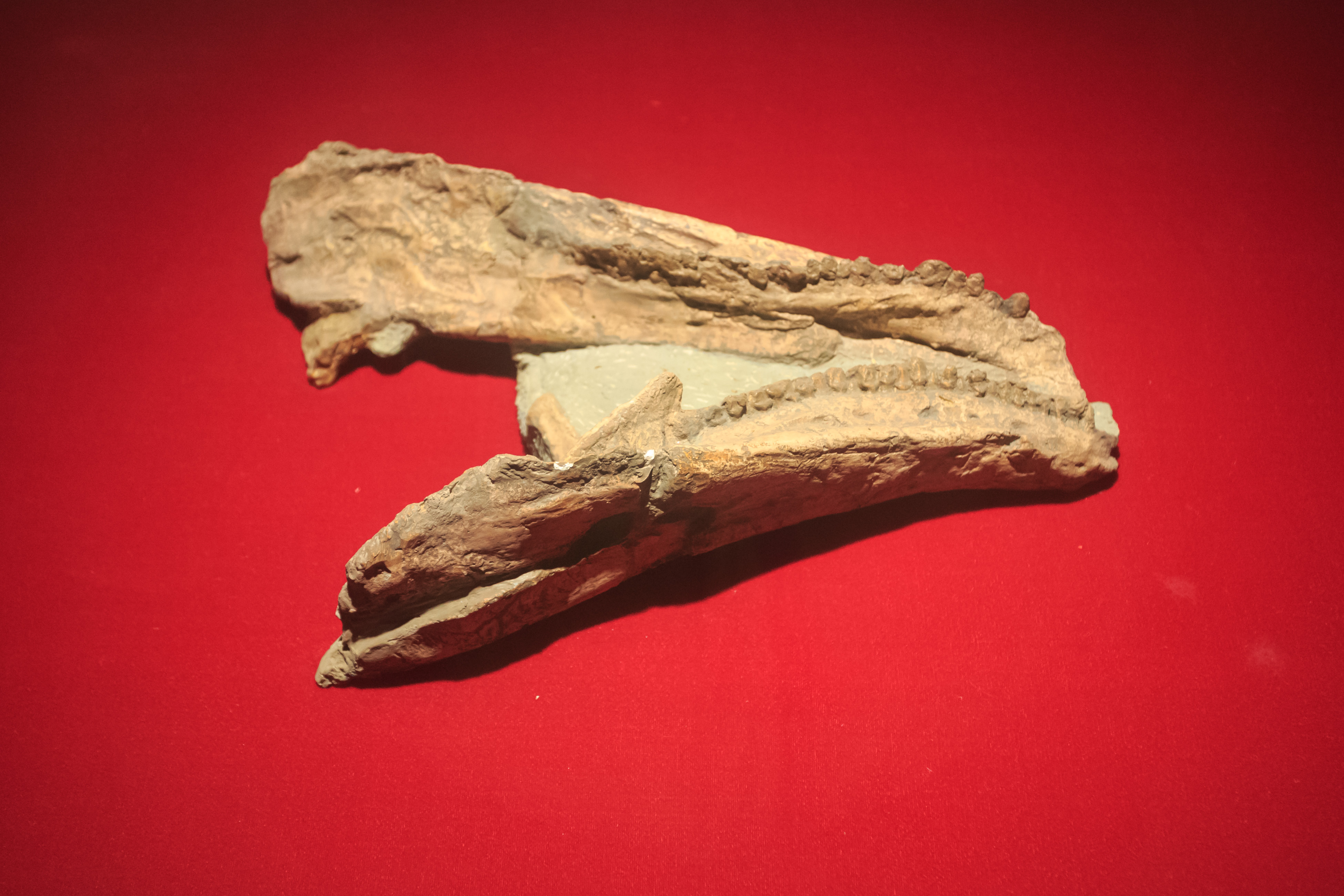
Lower jaw

The first fossil was found in 1985 by Ouyang Hui at Pengtang near Jinquan and was reported upon in 1986 by Gao Ruiqi and colleagues, mistaking it for a specimen of Tuojiangosaurus. The type species, Gigantspinosaurus sichuanensis, was described and named by Ouyang in 1992 in an abstract of a lecture. The generic name is derived from Latin gigas or giganteus, "enormous", and spina, "spine", in reference to the gigantic shoulder spines. The specific name refers to Sichuan.

The name was generally considered a nomen nudum in the West, until in 2006 it was disclosed that the abstract contained a sufficient description. Despite its uncertain nomenclatural status, images of Gigantspinosaurus had appeared in several sources. Public awareness of this animal was increased in early 2006 when Tracy Ford, considering it a validly established taxon, published a short article on reconstructing it. Ford suggested that earlier reconstructions of Gigantspinosaurus attached the shoulder spines upside-down, and his new reconstruction shows the spine extending somewhat upwards, ending higher than the top of the animal's back. Susannah Maidment and Wei Guangbiao in 2006 concluded that G. sichuanensis was a valid taxon in their review of Late Jurassic Chinese stegosaurs, but did not redescribe it because at that time it was under study by Zigong Dinosaur Museum staff. In fact, a Chinese redescription by Peng Guangzhao and colleagues in 2005 would predate Maidment's publication.

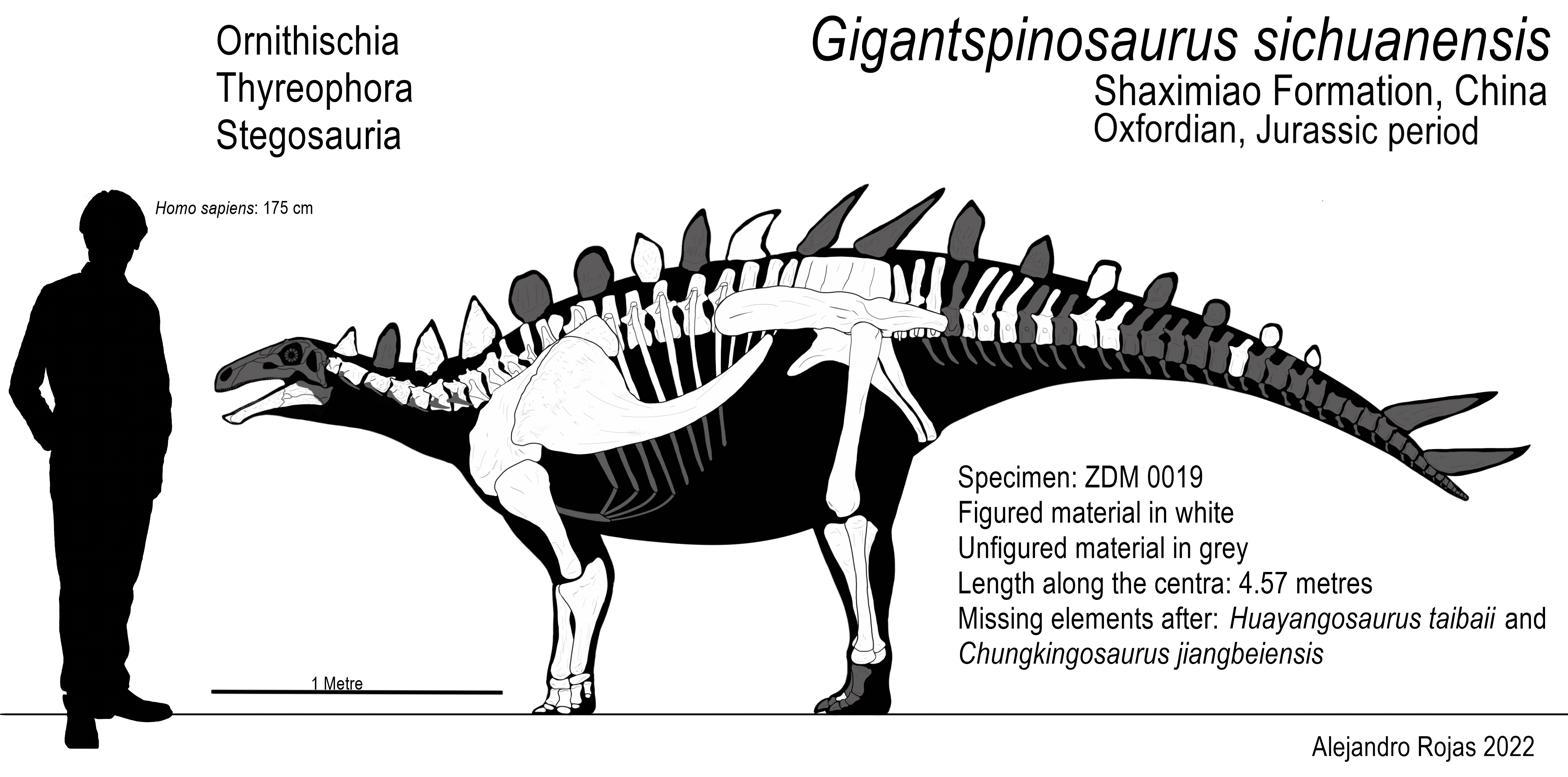
Skeletal diagram with known elements in white and unknown elements in grey

The holotype, ZDM 0019, was found in layers of the Upper Shaximiao Formation of Zigong (Sichuan province), which date to the Oxfordian. It consists of a partial skeleton of a probably subadult individual missing the skull (though the lower jaws are present), hind feet, and the tail end. Apart from skeletal elements also plates, spines and scutes have been found. At the left shoulder an impression of the skin had been preserved. The specimen is part of the collection of the Zigong Dinosaur Museum and has as a mounted restored skeleton been on display since 1996. In 2005 Peng e.a. reported a second specimen, ZDM 0156, a pelvis found at Chenjia near Fuquan.

== Description ==
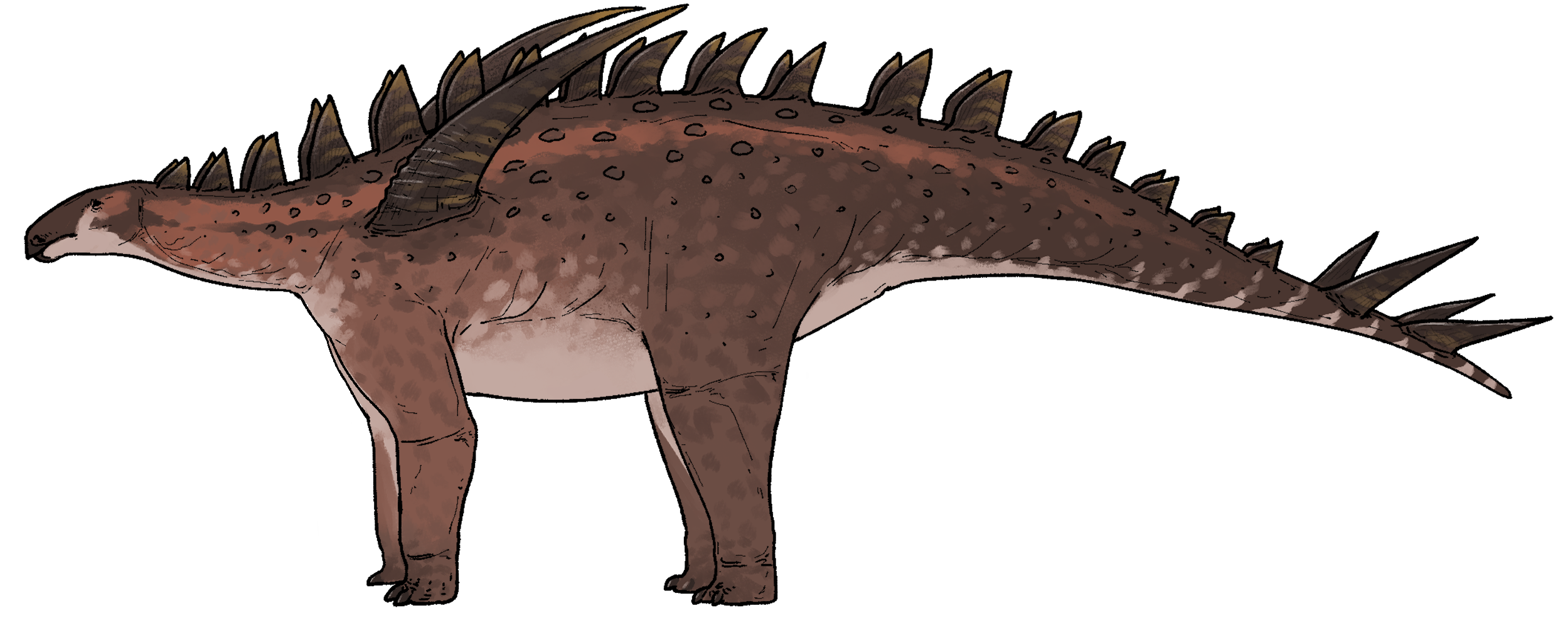
Life restoration

Gigantspinosaurus was described by Peng and colleagues as a "medium-sized stegosaur". It is estimated to have been about 4.2–7 metres (14–23 ft) in length and 700 kilograms (1,500 lb) in weight. Gigantspinosaurus has a distinctive appearance with relatively small dorsal plates and greatly enlarged shoulder spines, spinae parascapulares, twice the length of the shoulder blades on which they rested via large flat bases. The plates on the neck are small and triangular. The head must have been relatively large with thirty teeth in each lower jaw. The hips are very broad and the low neural spines of the four sacral vertebrae and the first tail vertebra have been fused into a single plate. It also had robust forelimbs.

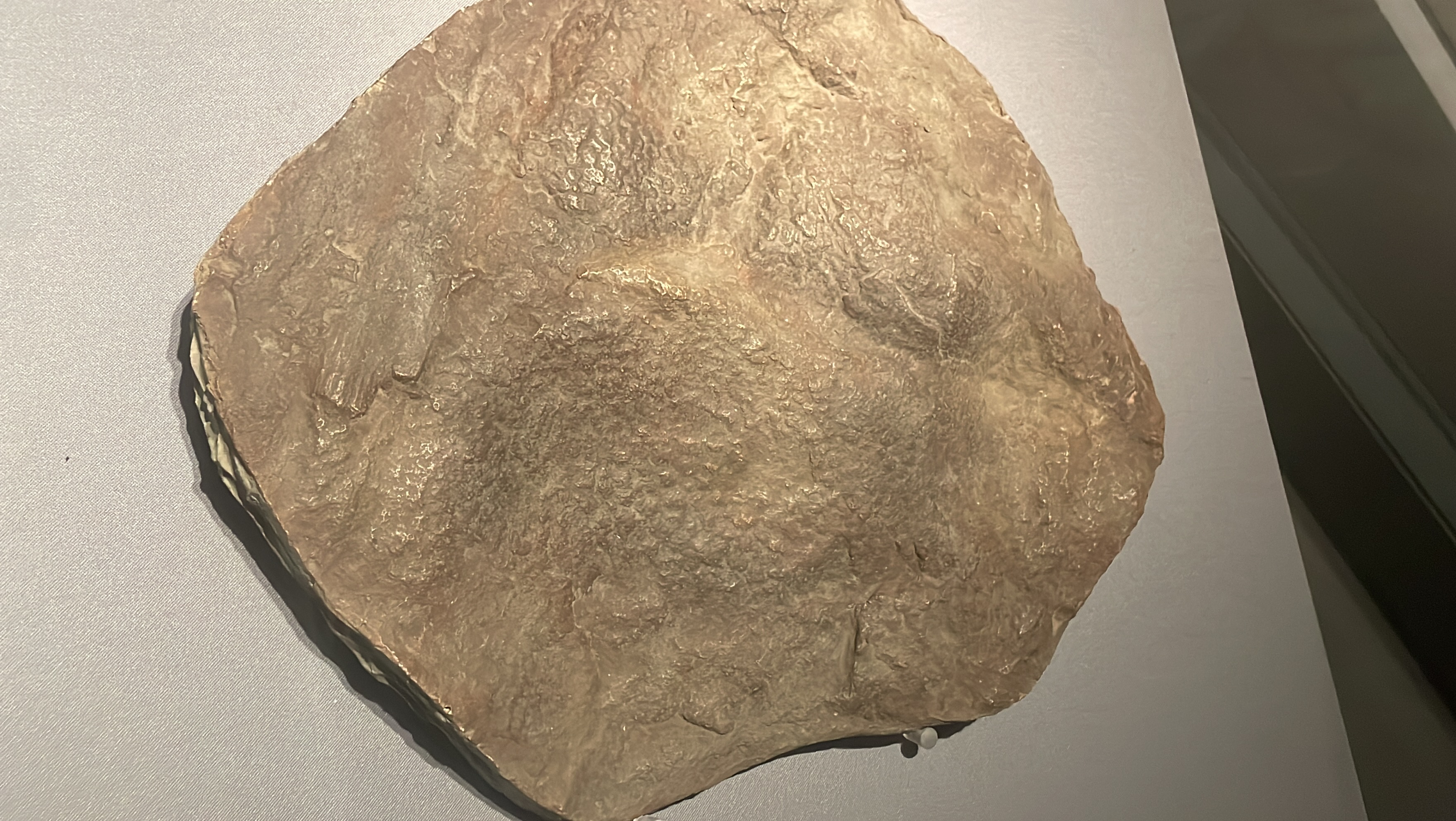
Skin impression of Gigantspinosaurus on display in the Zigong Dinosaur Museum

The skin impressions were described by Xing Lida and colleagues in 2008. They cover a surface of 414 square centimetres (64.2 sq in) and show rosettes with a central pentagonal or hexagonal scale surrounded by thirteen to fourteen ridged smaller square, pentagonal or hexagonal scales with a diameter of 5.7 to 9.2 millimetres (0.22 to 0.36 in).

== Classification ==
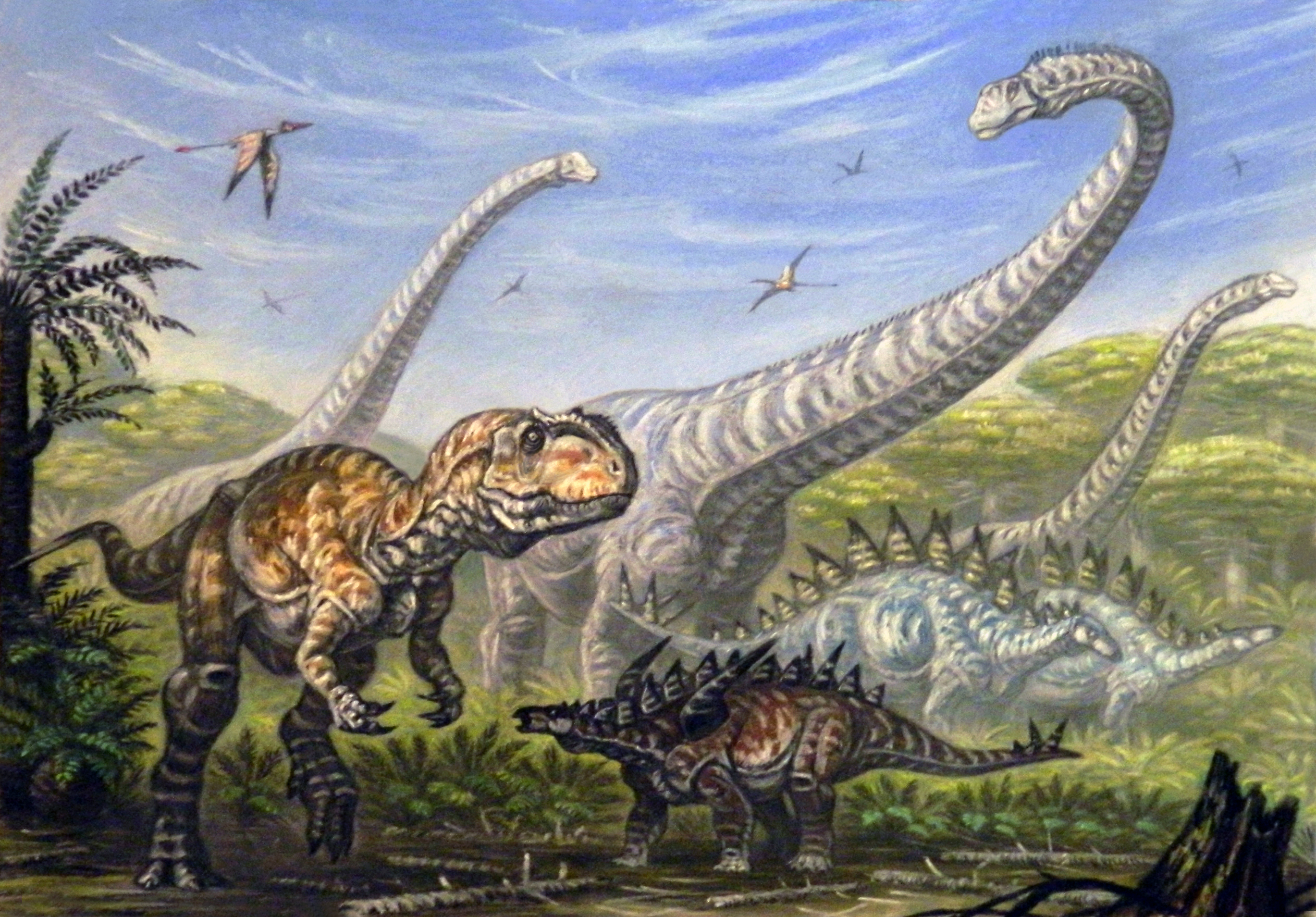
Restoration of Gigantspinosaurus (middle) and other dinosaurs from the Shaximiao Formation

A study by Maidment indicated that Gigantspinosaurus is the most basal known member of the Stegosauria. A 2018 redescription by Hao et al clarified aspects of the anatomy and found that it was an intermediate basal stegosaur, sharing basal traits with huayangosaurids as well as somewhat more advanced traits with other stegosaurs. Nevertheless, this analysis found that it was not the most basal stegosaur, as the huayangosaurids Chungkingosaurus and Huayangosaurus were considered more basal.

== See also ==
- Timeline of stegosaur research
