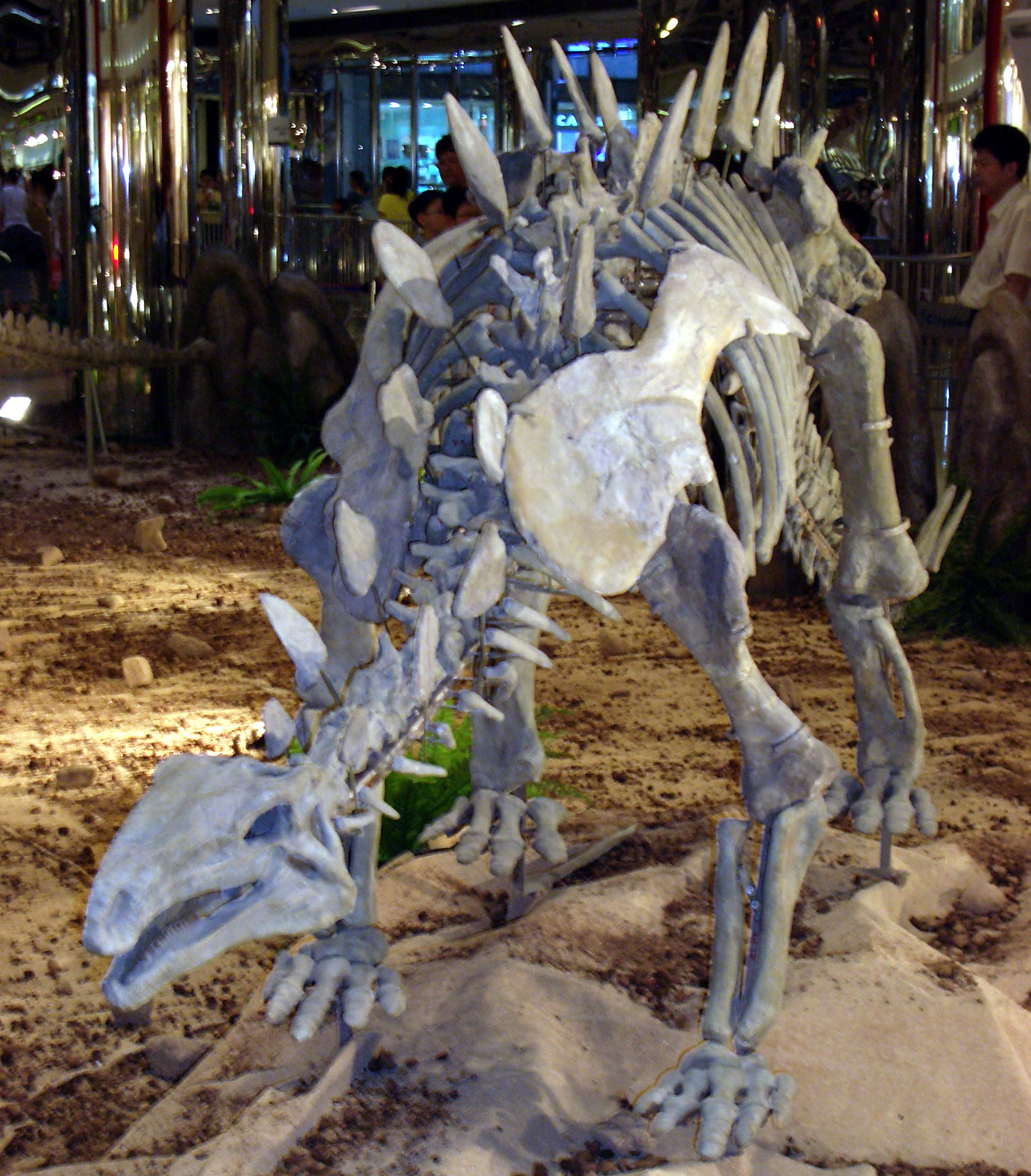
- Huayangosaurus reconstruction displayed in Hong Kong

Scientific classification
- Kingdom: Animalia
- Phylum: Chordata
- Class: Reptilia
- Clade: Dinosauria
- Clade: †Ornithischia
- Clade: †Thyreophora
- Clade: †Stegosauria
- Family: †Huayangosauridae
- Genus: †Huayangosaurus; Dong, Tang, and Zhou, 1982

Type species
- †Huayangosaurus taibaii Dong, Tang, and Zhou, 1982

= Huayangosaurus =

Huayangosaurus Temporal range: Middle Jurassic, 170.3–163.5 Ma

Extinct genus of dinosaurs

Huayangosaurus is a genus of stegosaurian dinosaur from the Middle Jurassic of China. The name derives from "Huayang" (華陽), an alternate name for Sichuan (the province where it was discovered), and "saurus", meaning "lizard". It lived during the Bathonian to Callovian stages, around 165 million years ago, some 20 million years before its famous relative, Stegosaurus appeared in North America. At only approximately 4 metres (13 ft) long, it was also much smaller than its famous cousin. Found in the Lower Shaximiao Formation, Huayangosaurus shared the local Middle Jurassic landscape with the sauropods Shunosaurus, Datousaurus, Omeisaurus and Protognathosaurus, the ornithopod Xiaosaurus and the carnivorous Gasosaurus.

== Description ==
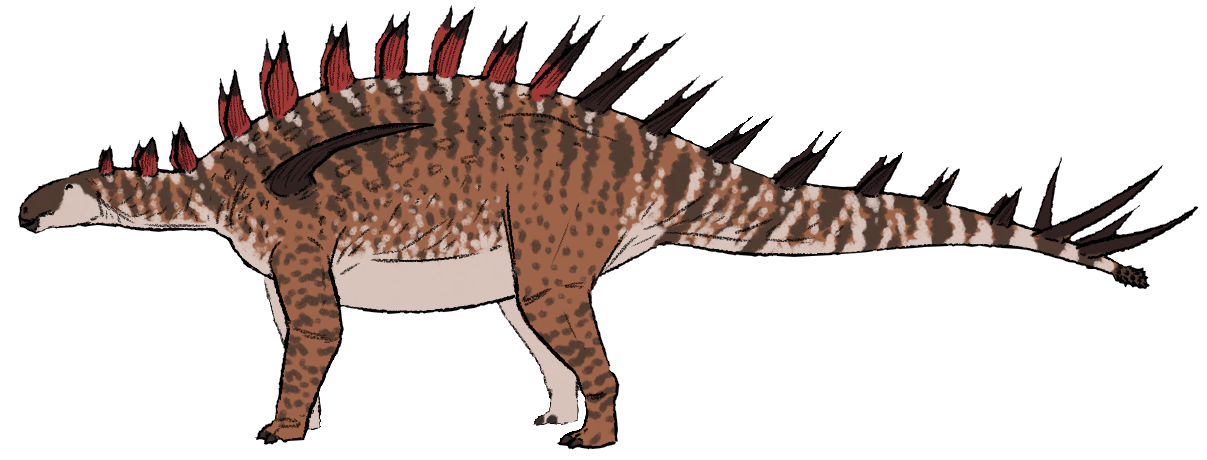
Restoration

As with other stegosaurians, Huayangosaurus was a quadrupedal herbivore with a small skull and a spiked tail. Like Stegosaurus, Huayangosaurus bore the distinctive double row of plates that characterize all the stegosaurians. These plates rose vertically along its arched back. In Huayangosaurus, the plates were more spike-like than in Stegosaurus. Like Stegosaurus, however, it bore two pairs of long spikes extending horizontally near the end of its tail.

Huayangosaurus had several types of osteoderms. On its neck, back, and tail were two rows of paired small vertical plates and spikes. On the rear of the tail, pairs of spikes were present forming the so-called "thagomizer", a defensive weapon. Each flank had a row of smaller osteoderms, culminating in a long shoulder spine in front, curving to the rear.

Huayangosaurus was one of the smallest known stegosaurians, at just 4 metres (13 ft) in length and 500 kilograms (1,100 lb) in body mass.

== Discovery and species ==
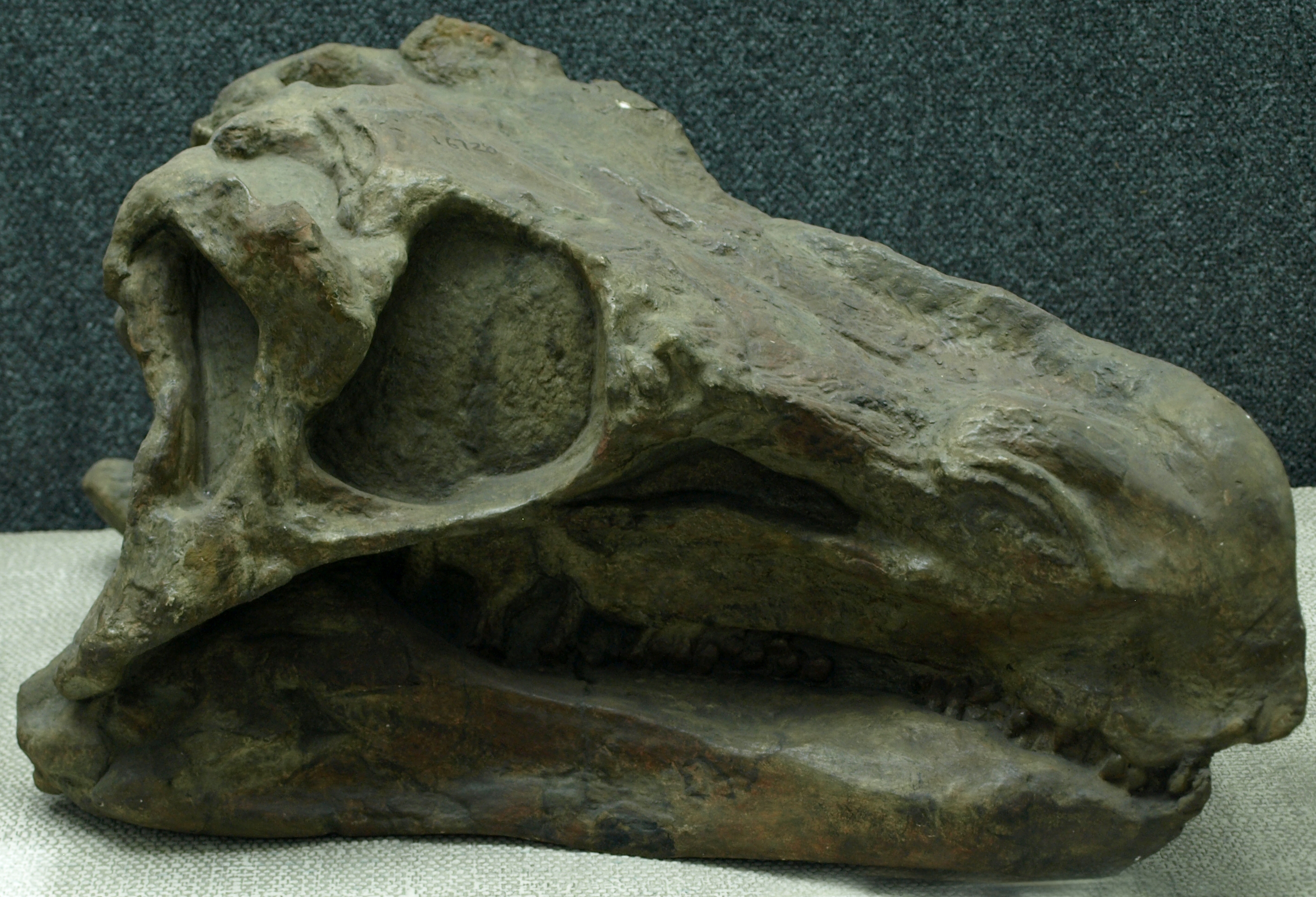
Skull of Huayangosaurus taibaii, on display at the Paleozoological Museum of China.

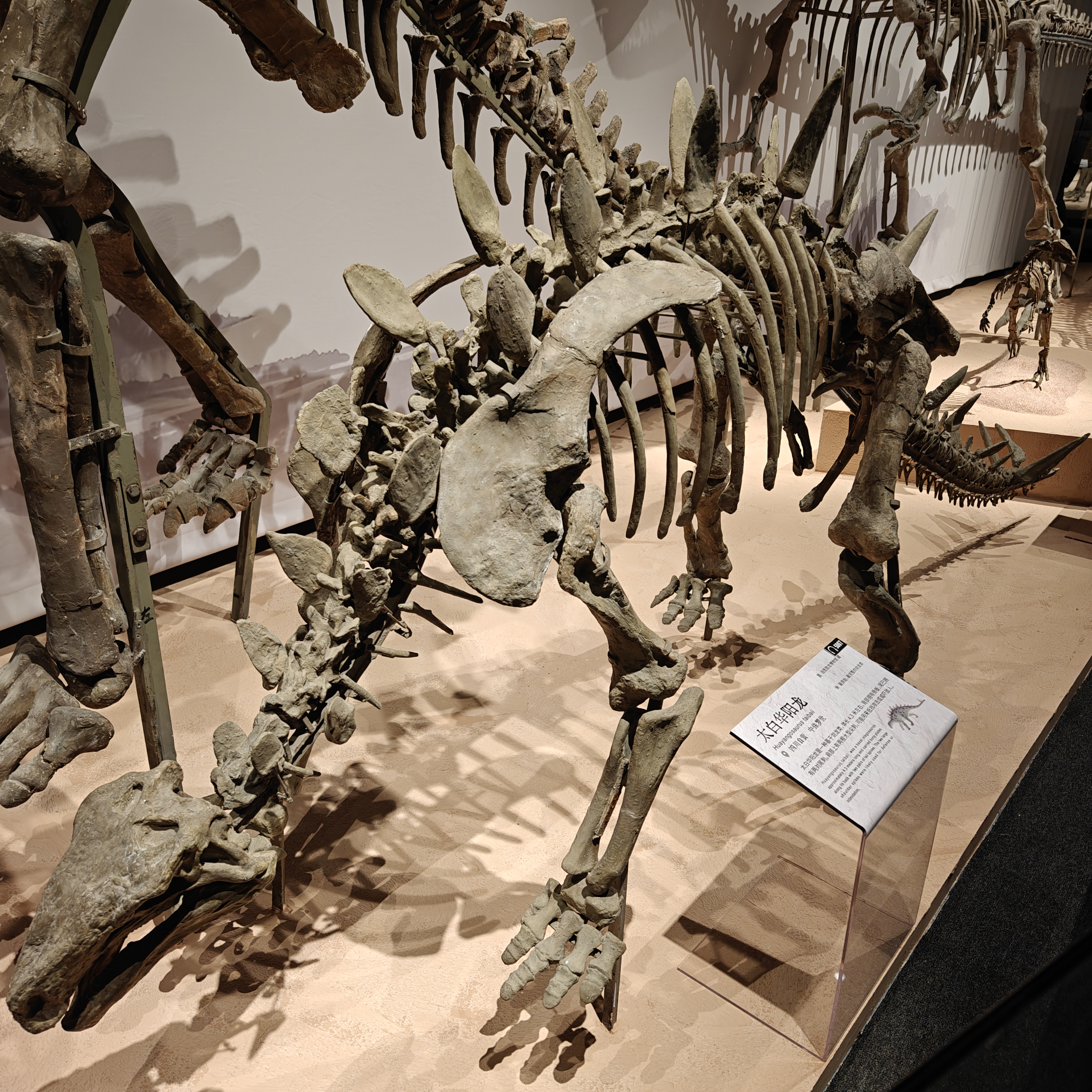
Skeleton mount of Huayangosaurus taibaii, on temporary display at the Shanghai Natural History Museum.

In 1979 and 1980, remains from twelve stegosaurian individual animals were recovered from the Dashanpu Quarry near Zigong in Sichuan. They were named and described by Dong Zhiming, Tang Zilu and Zhou Shiwu in 1982. The type species is Huayangosaurus taibaii. The generic name refers to Huayang, an old name for Sichuan, but at the same time alludes to the Hua Yang Guo Zhi from the Jin Dynasty, the oldest known gazetteer from China. The specific name honours the great Chinese poet Li Bai whose courtesy name was Taibai.

The holotype, IVPP V6728, was recovered from a layer of the lower Shaximiao Formation dating from the Bathonian-Callovian. It consists of a partial skeleton. It contains a relatively complete skull, three neck vertebrae, three back vertebrae, four sacral vertebrae, twenty tail vertebrae, two metatarsals, three phalanges, three plates, a spike and three further osteoderms. Several specimens were referred: ZDM T7001: a more complete skeleton containing a skull, eight cervicals, sixteen dorsals, four sacrals, thirty-five caudals, a complete shoulder girdle, a left humerus, both ilia, a left pubic bone, both ischia, three metatarsals, three phalanges and eleven plates; ZDM T7002: vertebrae; ZDM T7003: vertebrae and a pelvis; ZDM T7004: caudal vertebrae; CV 720: a skull, twenty-eight vertebrae and twenty plates; and CV 721: seven vertebrae.

In 2006, Susannah Maidment, Guangbiao Wei, and David B. Norman reviewed the material. In several specimens, ZDM T7002, CV 720 and CV 721, no shared distinguishing features with the holotype could be established; they considered them no longer referable to Huayangosaurus. For CV 720 the reason was that this specimen could not be located in the collection. CV 721 was found to be so different that they suggested it might be a separate taxon.

Mounted skeletons of Huayangosaurus are on display at the Zigong Dinosaur Museum in Zigong and the Municipal Museum of Chongqing in Sichuan Province in China.

== Classification ==
Skeletal and size compared to a human

Huayangosaurus is often placed within a taxonomic family, Huayangosauridae, defined as the largest clade containing Huayangosaurus taibaii but not Stegosaurus stenops. It is also morphologically distinct from later (stegosaurid) forms. Its skull was broader and had premaxillary teeth in the front of its mouth. All later stegosaurians lost these teeth.

== Palaeobiology ==
Like many other stegosaurians, it had plates all down its back and spikes on its tail. Two large spikes were above its hips, and may have been used for deterring an attack from above (considering as it was fairly short in height compared to later stegosaurians). Its plates were smaller than those of Stegosaurus, with much less surface area. Thus they would have been much less effective heat regulators, one of the postulated functions of plates.

== See also ==
- Timeline of stegosaur research
