= Zigongosaurus =

Zigongosaurus Temporal range: Middle Jurassic – Late Jurassic

Scientific classification
- Kingdom: Animalia
- Phylum: Chordata
- Class: Reptilia
- Clade: Dinosauria
- Clade: Saurischia
- Clade: †Sauropodomorpha
- Clade: †Sauropoda
- Family: †Mamenchisauridae
- Genus: †Zigongosaurus; Hou, Zhou & Chao, 1976
- Species: †Z. fuxiensis

Binomial name
- †Zigongosaurus fuxiensis Hou, Zhou & Chao, 1976

Synonyms
- Mamenchisaurus fuxiensis Hou et al., 1976

Extinct genus of dinosaurs

Zigongosaurus (meaning "Zigong lizard") is a genus of sauropod dinosaur from the Middle–Late Jurassic-aged Shaximiao Formation of Zigong, Sichuan, China. Because of incomplete knowledge of Jurassic Chinese sauropods, it has been hard to interpret, with some sources assigning it to Omeisaurus, some to Mamenchisaurus, and some to its own genus.

== History and taxonomy ==
The genus was based on CV 02501, a specimen including a partial mandible, maxilla and basioccipital (a bone from the braincase region). Additional bones from all areas of the skeleton, belonging to multiple individuals, were also described and assigned to the new genus. The authors thought it resembled Omeisaurus, but was distinct based on vertebral details. Early accounts in the popular press suggested it was a brachiosaurid.

Chinese sauropod taxonomy became increasingly convoluted in the 1980s. In 1983, Dong, Zhou and Zhang named a species Omeisaurus fuxiensis, which they based on different material than Zigongosaurus fuxiensis, but then suggested that the two were the same animal. Following this, the genus was thought to belong to Omeisaurus, possibly as a synonym of O. junghsiensis. In the mid-1990s, opinion shifted, and the genus was instead assigned, by Zhang and Chen, to Mamenchisaurus. They noted that it came from a stratigraphic level between the usual Omeisaurus and Mamenchisaurus beds in age, but more closely resembled Mamenchisaurus. In particular, the neural spines of the vertebrae (the part of the vertebra that sticks up, over the passage for the spinal cord) in both genera have distinctive weak bifurcation, or splitting, that is not found in Omeisaurus. The authors renamed it Mamenchisaurus fuxiensis. This assignment was followed provisionally in the most recent major review of sauropods, but at least one author (Valérie Martin-Rolland) has found it to be a distinct genus.

== Paleobiology ==
Zigongosaurus would have been a large, quadrupedal herbivore with a long neck. It is regarded as a medium- to large-sized sauropod, with a length of around 15 meters (49 feet).
