= Bienotheroides =

Bienotheroides Temporal range: Middle to Late Jurassic, 171.6–145.5 Ma
- Fossil jaw of B. xingshanensis, National Natural History Museum of China

Scientific classification
- Kingdom: Animalia
- Phylum: Chordata
- Clade: Synapsida
- Clade: Therapsida
- Clade: Cynodontia
- Family: †Tritylodontidae
- Genus: †Bienotheroides; Young, 1982

Type species
- †Bienotheroides wansienensis Young, 1982

Other species
- †B. shartegensis Watabe et al., 2007; †B. ultimus Maisch et al., 2004; †B. wucaiensis Liu et al., 2025; †B. xingshanensis Liu et al., 2022; †B. zigongensis Sun, 1986

Extinct genus of mammaliamorphs

Bienotheroides is an extinct genus of tritylodontid mammaliamorphs from the Jurassic of China and Mongolia. The genus contains six species, primarily known from cranial remains.
