= Dashanpusaurus =

Dashanpusaurus Temporal range: 165 Ma Middle Jurassic

Scientific classification
- Kingdom: Animalia
- Phylum: Chordata
- Class: Reptilia
- Clade: Dinosauria
- Clade: Saurischia
- Clade: †Sauropodomorpha
- Clade: †Sauropoda
- Clade: †Macronaria (?)
- Genus: †Dashanpusaurus; Peng et al., 2005
- Species: †D. dongi

Binomial name
- †Dashanpusaurus dongi Peng et al., 2005

Extinct genus of dinosaurs

Dashanpusaurus (meaning "Dashanpu lizard" after the township it was discovered in) is an extinct genus of sauropod dinosaur that lived during the middle of the Jurassic period. The dinosaur was described in 2005 by Peng Guangzhao, Ye Yong, Gao Yuhui, Shu Chunkang, and Jiang Shan. Its type and only species is Dashanpusaurus dongi, named in honor of the paleontologist Dong Zhiming.

Dashanpusaurus was a herbivore and was quadrupedal, like most others in the Sauropoda. The Dashanpusaurus holotype, ZDM 5028, a partial skeleton lacking the skull, was unearthed in the Sichuan, China township of Dashanpu, in a layer of the Shaximiao Formation. Dashanpu is only seven kilometres from Zigong, the city where the dinosaur's remains are being held. It consisted of many bone fragments and vertebrae, as well as a partial pelvis and other hind pieces. Other than the dinosaur's holotype, numerous other Dashanpusaurus specimens have been recovered from the area among which the paratype ZDM 5027, another partial skeleton.

== Classification ==
Dashanpusaurus was originally described as a member of Camarasauridae. A phylogenetic analysis conducted by Mo Jinyou in 2013 recovered Dashanpusaurus as a non-neosauropod eusauropod, more derived than Shunosaurus but more basal than Barapasaurus. In 2022, it was found to be the most basal macronarian.

- Macronaria
  - Dashanpusaurus
  - - Camarasaurus
    - - - Lourinhasaurus
        - - Bellusaurus
          - - Janenschia
            - Aragosaurus
      - - Europasaurus
        - - - Euhelopus
            - Galvesaurus
          - - Tehuelchesaurus
            - - Tastavinsaurus
              - Titanosauriformes
