= Xiaosaurus =

Xiaosaurus Temporal range: Middle Jurassic, 170.3–163.5 Ma

Scientific classification
- Kingdom: Animalia
- Phylum: Chordata
- Class: Reptilia
- Clade: Dinosauria
- Clade: †Ornithischia
- Clade: †Neornithischia
- Genus: †Xiaosaurus; Dong & Tang, 1983
- Species: †X. dashanpensis

Binomial name
- †Xiaosaurus dashanpensis Dong & Tang, 1983

Extinct genus of dinosaurs

Xiaosaurus ("dawn lizard", /ʃaʊˈsɔːrəs/), is a genus of small herbivorous ornithischian dinosaur from the middle Jurassic (approximately 170.3 to 163.5 million years ago) of what is now the Sichuan Basin of China.

== Discovery and naming ==
In 1979 and 1980, two specimens were discovered of a small herbivorous dinosaur during excavations near Dashanpu in Sichuan. In 1983 Dong Zhiming and Tang Zilu named the fossils under the type species Xiaosaurus dashanpensis. The generic name is derived from Chinese xiáo, 曉, "dawn", a reference to the age of the fossil. The specific name refers to Danshanpu.

The holotype, IVPP V6730A, was found in the lower Xiashaximiao Formation of which the age is uncertain: both the Bajocian and the Bathonian–Callovian have been proposed. It consists of a partial skeleton including a jaw fragment with a single tooth, two cervical vertebrae, four caudal vertebrae, a humerus, a partial left femur and a complete right hindlimb. The paratype IVPP V6730B is a second partial skeleton including a right femur, a dorsal vertebra, two sacral vertebrae, a phalanx, a rib and two teeth.

In 1992 Peng Guangzhao renamed Agilisaurus multidens He & Cai 1983 (now Hexinlusaurus) into a second species of Xiaosaurus: Xiaosaurus multidens, but this has not been accepted.

== Description ==
Xiaosaurus was a small bipedal animal with an estimated length of 1 metre (3.3 ft). The femur is 11 centimetres (4.3 in) long.

== Classification ==
The remains are too fragmentary to easily classify the genus. The describers assigned it both to the Fabrosauridae and the Hypsilophodontidae, considering it an evolutionary link between Lesothosaurus and Hypsilophodon. Xiaosaurus has sometimes been considered a nomen dubium and an ornithischian of uncertain affinities, possibly a basal cerapod or marginocephalian. However, Paul Barrett et al. in 2005 concluded it to be provisionally valid, as it possessed a single unique derived trait or autapomorphy: a mediolaterally (seen from the front) straight humerus.
