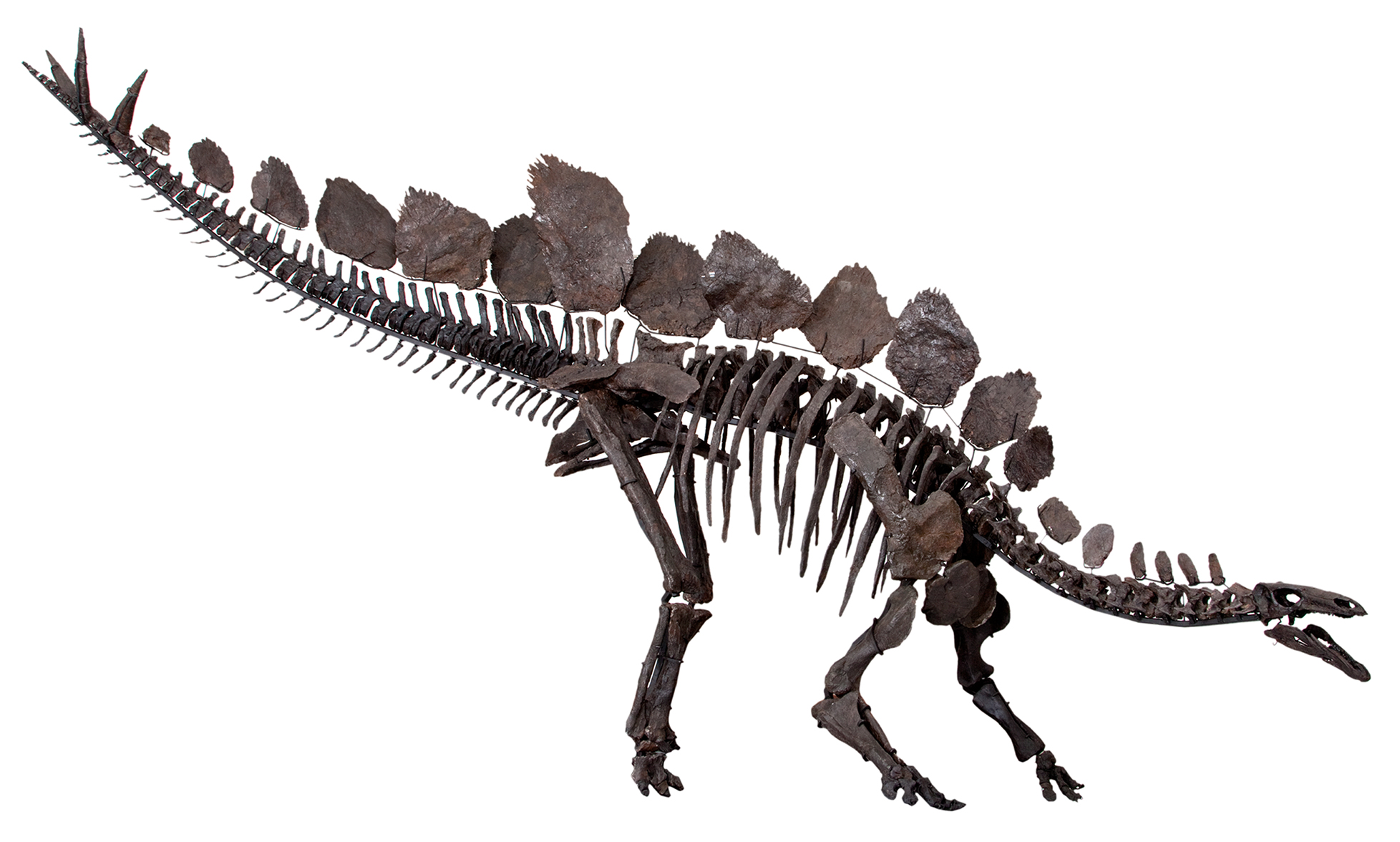
- Mounted skeleton of S. stenops (nicknamed "Sophie"), Natural History Museum, London

Scientific classification
- Kingdom: Animalia
- Phylum: Chordata
- Class: Reptilia
- Clade: Dinosauria
- Clade: †Ornithischia
- Clade: †Thyreophora
- Clade: †Stegosauria
- Family: †Stegosauridae
- Subfamily: †Stegosaurinae
- Genus: †Stegosaurus; Marsh, 1877

Type species
- †Stegosaurus stenops Marsh, 1887

Other species
- †S. ungulatus Marsh, 1879; †S. sulcatus Marsh, 1887

Synonyms
- Hypsirhophus? Cope, 1878; Diracodon Marsh, 1881

= Stegosaurus =

Stegosaurus Temporal range: Late Jurassic (Kimmeridgian to Tithonian), 155–145 Ma

Genus of Late Jurassic armored dinosaur

Stegosaurus (/ˌstɛɡəˈsɔːrəs/; lit. 'roof-lizard') is a genus of extinct herbivorous four-legged armored dinosaurs from the Late Jurassic, characterized by the distinctive kite-shaped upright plates along their backs and spikes on their tails. Fossils of the genus have been found in the western United States and in Portugal, where they are found in Kimmeridgian- to Tithonian-aged strata, dating to between 155 and 145 million years ago. Of the species that have been classified in the upper Morrison Formation of the western US, only three are universally recognized: S. stenops, S. ungulatus and S. sulcatus. The remains of over 80 individual animals of this genus have been found. Stegosaurus would have lived alongside dinosaurs such as Apatosaurus, Diplodocus, Camarasaurus and Allosaurus, the latter of which may have preyed on it.

They were large, heavily built, herbivorous quadrupeds with rounded backs, short fore limbs, long hind limbs, and tails held high in the air. Due to their distinctive combination of broad, upright plates and tail tipped with spikes, Stegosaurus is one of the most recognizable kinds of dinosaurs. The function of this array of plates and spikes has been the subject of much speculation among scientists. Today, it is generally agreed that their spiked tails were most likely used for defense against predators, while their plates may have been used primarily for display, and secondarily for thermoregulatory functions. Stegosaurus had a relatively low brain-to-body mass ratio. It had a short neck and a small head, meaning it most likely ate low-lying bushes and shrubs. One species, Stegosaurus ungulatus, is one of the largest known of all the stegosaurians, with the largest known specimens measuring about 9 metres (30 ft) long and weighing over 6.9 metric tons (7.6 short tons).

Stegosaurus remains were first identified during the "Bone Wars" by Othniel Charles Marsh at Dinosaur Ridge National Landmark. The first known skeletons were fragmentary and the bones were scattered, and it would be many years before the true appearance of these animals, including their posture and plate arrangement, became well understood. Despite its popularity in books and film, mounted skeletons of Stegosaurus did not become a staple of major natural history museums until the mid-20th century, and many museums have had to assemble composite displays from several different specimens due to a lack of complete skeletons. Stegosaurus is one of the better-known dinosaurs and has been featured in film, on postal stamps, and in many other types of media.

== History and naming ==
=== Bone Wars and Stegosaurus armatus ===
Stegosaurus, one of the many dinosaurs described in the Bone Wars, was first discovered by Arthur Lakes and H.C. Beckwith, consisting of several caudal vertebrae, a dermal plate, and several additional postcranial elements that were collected north of Morrison, Colorado, at Lakes' YPM Quarry 5. These first, fragmented bones (YPM 1850) became the holotype of Stegosaurus armatus when Yale paleontologist Othniel Charles Marsh described them in 1877. Marsh initially believed the remains were from an aquatic turtle-like animal, and the basis for its scientific name, 'roof(ed) lizard' was due to his early belief that the plates lay flat over the animal's back, overlapping like the shingles (tiles) on a roof. Though several more complete specimens have been attributed to Stegosaurus armatus, preparation of the bones and analysis has discovered that this type specimen is actually dubious, which is not an ideal situation for the type species of a well-known genus like Stegosaurus. Because of this, the International Commission on Zoological Nomenclature decided to replace the type species with the more well known species Stegosaurus stenops. Marsh also incorrectly referred several fossils to S. armatus, including the dentary and teeth of the sauropod Diplodocus and putting sauropod limb bones and an Allosaurus tibia under YPM 1850.

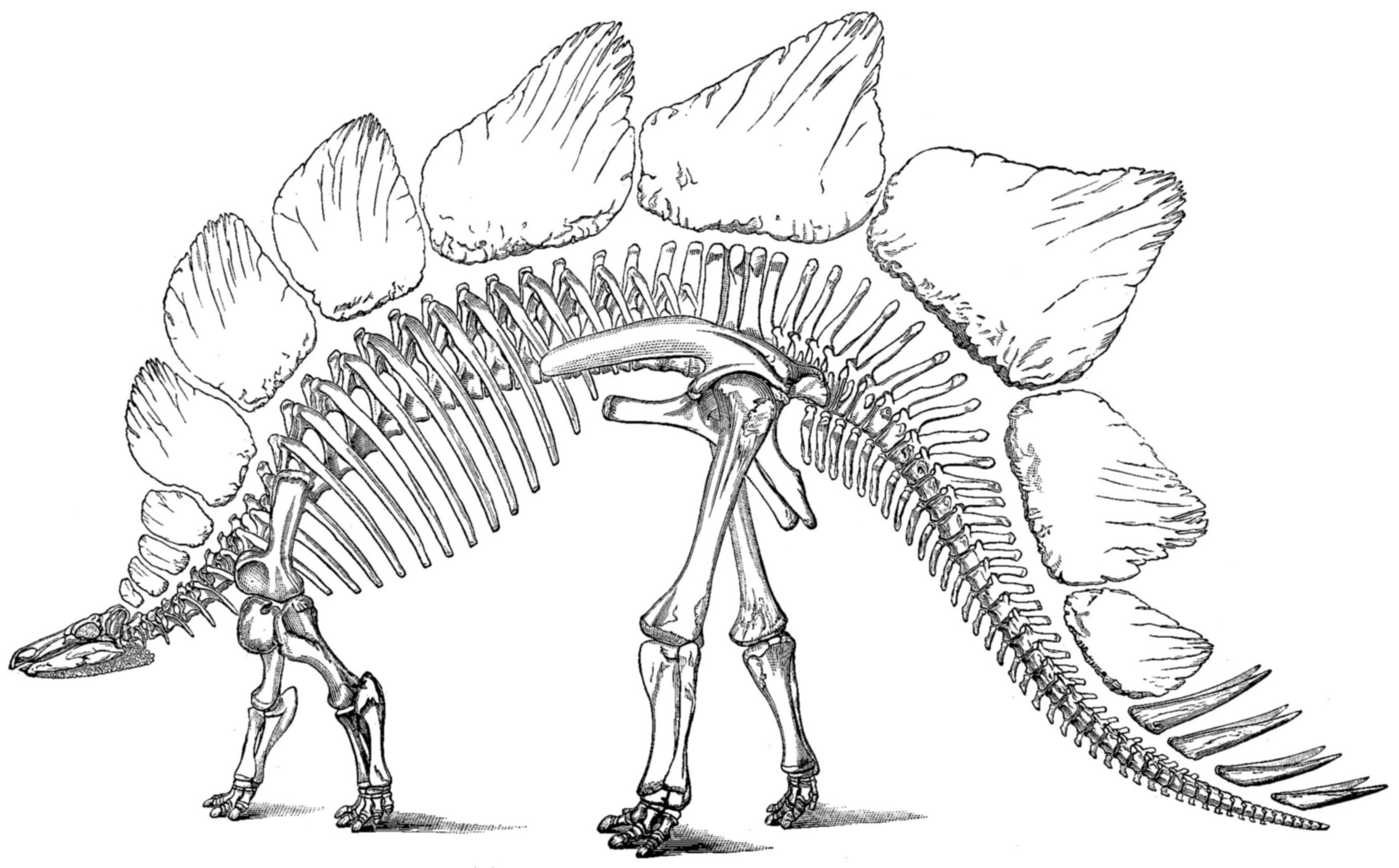
Marsh's 1891 illustration of S. ungulatus. Note the single row of 12 large rounded plates, based on those of S. stenops, and eight spikes

On the other side of the Bone Wars, Edward Drinker Cope named Hypsirhophus discurus as another stegosaurian based on fragmentary fossils from Cope's Quarry 3 near the "Cope's Nipple" site in Garden Park, Colorado, in 1878. Many later researchers have considered Hypsirhophus to be a synonym of Stegosaurus, though Peter Galton (2010) suggested that it is distinct based on differences in the vertebrae. F. F. Hubbell, a collector for Cope, also found a partial Stegosaurus skeleton while digging at Como Bluff in 1877 or '78 that are now part of the Stegosaurus mount (AMNH 5752) at the American Museum of Natural History.

Arthur Lakes made another discovery later in 1879 at Como Bluff in Albany County, Wyoming, the site also dating to the Upper Jurassic of the Morrison Formation, when he found several large Stegosaurus fossils in August of that year. The majority of the fossils came from Quarry 13, including the type specimen of Stegosaurus ungulatus (YPM 1853), which was collected by Lakes and William Harlow Reed the same year and named by Marsh. The specimen was one of many found at the quarry, the specimen consisting of a partial skull, several vertebrae, an ischium, partial limbs, several plates, and four thagomizers, though eight thagomizers were referred based on a specimen preserved alongside the type. The type specimen also preserved the pes, which was the namesake of the species, meaning "hoofed roofed lizard". In 1881, he named a third species Stegosaurus "affinis", based only on a hip bone, though the fossil has since been lost and the species declared a nomen nudum. Later in 1887, Marsh described two more species of Stegosaurus from Como Bluff, Stegosaurus duplex, based on a partial vertebral column, partial pelvis, and partial left hindlimb (YPM 1858) from Reed's Quarry 11, though the species is now seen as synonymous with Stegosaurus ungulatus. The other, Stegosaurus sulcatus, was named based on a left forelimb, scapula, left femur, several vertebrae, and several plates and dermal armor elements (USNM V 4937) collected in 1883. Stegosaurus sulcatus most notably preserves a large spike that has been speculated to have been a shoulder spike that is used to diagnose the species.

The greatest Stegosaurus discovery came in 1885 with the discovery of a nearly complete, articulated skeleton of a subadult that included previously undiscovered elements like a complete skull, throat ossicles, and articulated plates. Marshall P. Felch collected the skeleton throughout 1885 and 1886 from Morrison Formation strata at his quarry in Garden Park, a town near Cañon City, Colorado. The skeleton was expertly unearthed by Felch, who first divided the skeleton into labeled blocks and prepared them separately. The skeleton was shipped to Marsh in 1887, who named it Stegosaurus stenops ( "narrow-faced roof lizard") that year. Though it had not yet been completely prepared, the nearly complete and articulated type specimen of Stegosaurus stenops allowed Marsh to complete the first attempt at a reconstructed Stegosaurus skeleton. This first reconstruction, of S. ungulatus with missing parts filled in from S. stenops, was published by Marsh in 1891. (In 1893, Richard Lydekker mistakenly re-published Marsh's drawing under the label Hypsirhophus.)

=== Early skeletal mounts and plate interpretation ===
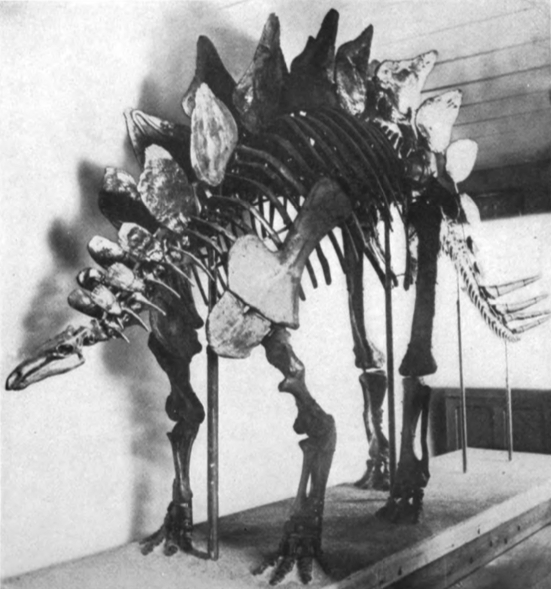
The first mounted skeleton of a stegosaur (S. ungulatus), Peabody Museum of Natural History, 1910

The skeleton of S. stenops has since been deposited at the National Museum of Natural History in Washington D. C., where it has been on display since 1915. Another mount was made for the NMNH in the form of a mounted composite skeleton consisting of several specimens referred to S. stenops that were collected at Quarry 13 at Como Bluff in 1887, the most complete being USNM 6531. The type specimen of S. ungulatus (YPM 1853) was incorporated into the first ever mounted skeleton of a stegosaur at the Peabody Museum of Natural History in 1910 by Richard Swann Lull. It was initially mounted with paired plates set wide, above the base of the ribs, but was remounted in 1924 with two staggered rows of plates along the midline of the back. Additional specimens recovered from the same quarry by the United States National Museum of Natural History, including tail vertebrae and an additional large plate (USNM 7414), belong to the same individual as YPM 1853.

The next species of Stegosaurus to be named was S. marshi by Frederick Lucas in 1901. Lucas reclassified this species in the new genus Hoplitosaurus later that year. Lucas also re-examined the issue of the life appearance of Stegosaurus, coming to the conclusion that the plates were arranged in pairs in two rows along the back, arranged above the bases of the ribs. Lucas commissioned Charles R. Knight to produce a life restoration of S. ungulatus based on his new interpretation. However, the following year, Lucas wrote that he now believed the plates were probably attached in staggered rows. In 1910, Richard Swann Lull wrote that the alternating pattern seen in S. stenops was probably due to shifting of the skeleton after death. He led the construction of the first ever Stegosaurus skeletal mount at the Peabody Museum of Natural History, which was depicted with paired plates. In 1914, Charles Gilmore argued against Lull's interpretation, noting that several specimens of S. stenops, including the now-completely prepared holotype, preserved the plates in alternating rows near the peak of the back, and that there was no evidence of the plates having shifted relative to the body during fossilization. Gilmore and Lucas' interpretation became the generally accepted standard, and Lull's mount at the Peabody Museum was changed to reflect this in 1924.

Though considered one of the most distinctive types of dinosaur, Stegosaurus displays were missing from a majority of museums during the first half of the 20th century, due largely to the disarticulated nature of most fossil specimens. Until 1918, the only mounted skeleton of Stegosaurus in the world was O. C. Marsh's type specimen of S. ungulatus at the Peabody Museum of Natural History, which was put on display in 1910. However, this mount was dismantled in 1917 when the old Peabody Museum building was demolished. This historically significant specimen was re-mounted ahead of the opening of the new Peabody Museum building in 1925. 1918 saw the completion of the second Stegosaurus mount, and the first depicting S. stenops. This mount was created under the direction of Charles Gilmore at the U.S. National Museum of Natural History. It was a composite of several skeletons, primarily USNM 6531, with proportions designed to closely follow the S. stenops type specimen, which had been on display in relief nearby since 1918. The aging mount was dismantled in 2003 and replaced with a cast in an updated pose in 2004. A third mounted skeleton of Stegosaurus, referred to S. stenops, was put on display at the American Museum of Natural History in 1932. Mounted under the direction of Charles J. Long, the American Museum mount was a composite consisting of partial remains filled in with replicas based on other specimens. In his article about the new mount for the museum's journal, Barnum Brown described (and disputed) the popular misconception that the Stegosaurus had a "second brain" in its hips. Another composite mount, using specimens referred to S. ungulatus collected from Dinosaur National Monument between 1920 and 1922, was put on display at the Carnegie Museum of Natural History in 1940.

==== Plate arrangement ====
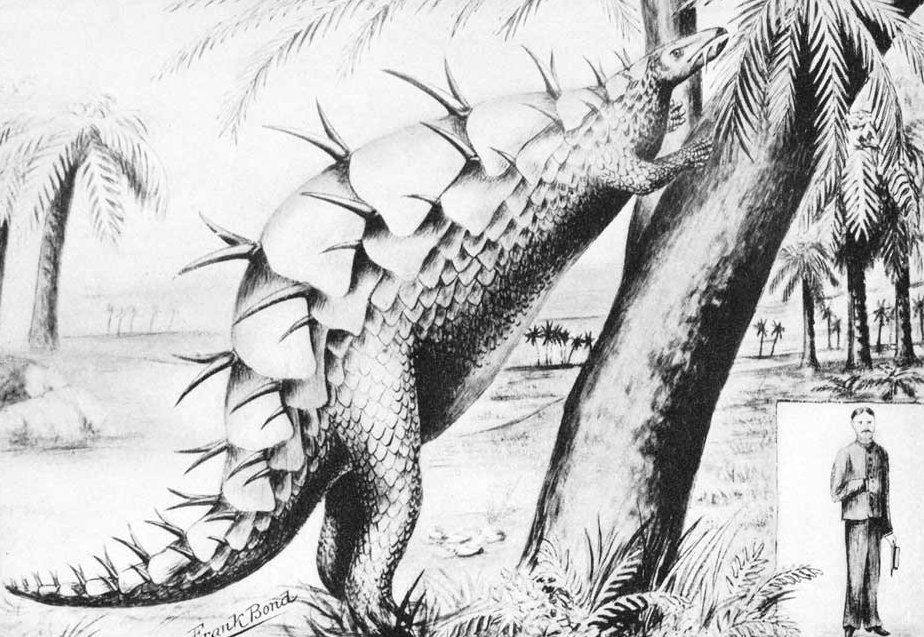
1899 life restoration showing the plates lying flat on the back with spikes all over the back

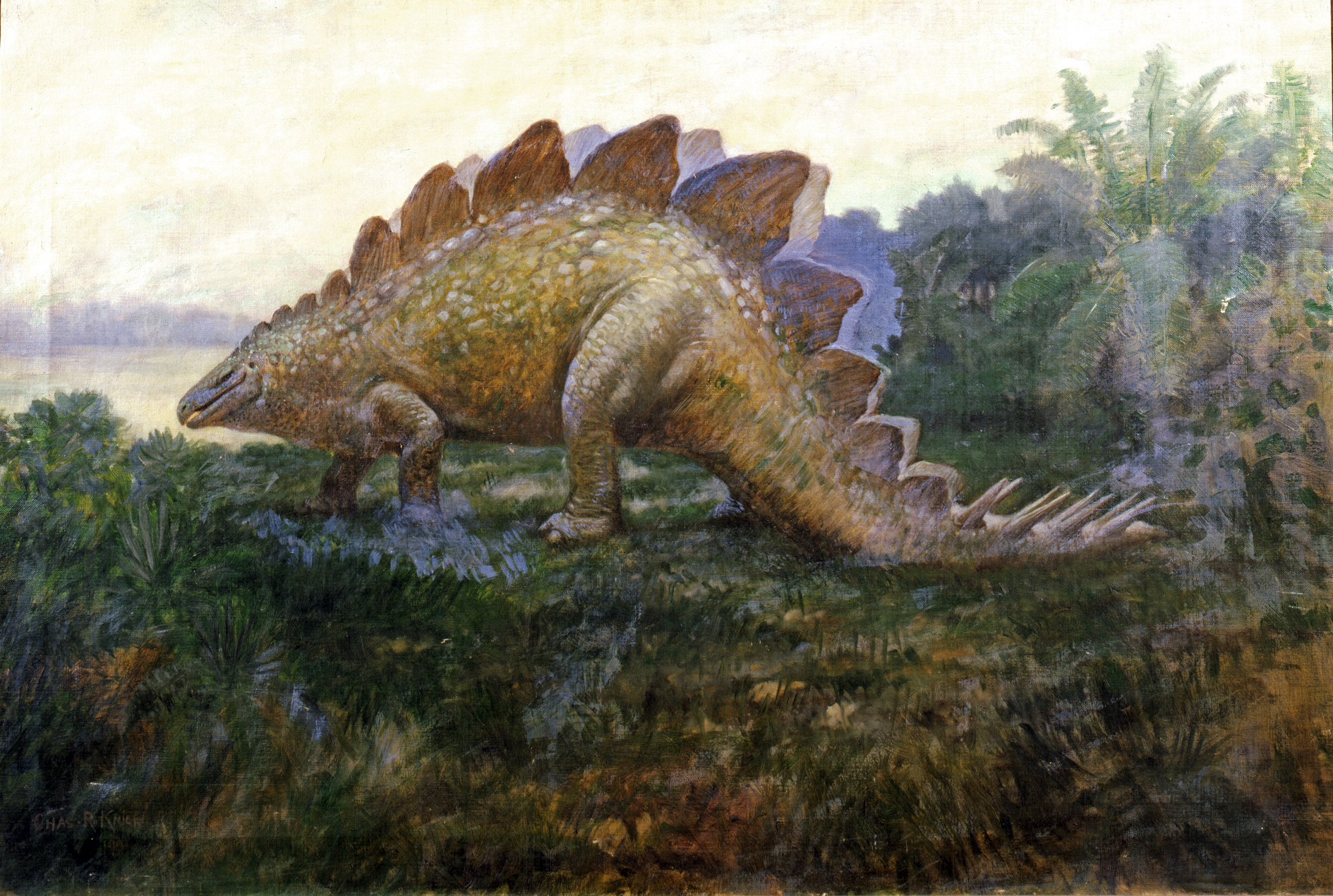
1901 life restoration of S. ungulatus by Charles R. Knight with paired dorsal plates and eight tail spikes

One of the major subjects of books and articles about Stegosaurus is the plate arrangement. The argument has been a major one in the history of dinosaur reconstruction. Four possible plate arrangements have been proposed over the years:

- The plates lie flat along the back, as a shingle-like armor. This was Marsh's initial interpretation, which led to the name 'roof lizard'. As further and complete plates were found, their form showed they stood on edge, rather than lying flat.
- By 1891, Marsh published a more familiar view of Stegosaurus, with a single row of plates. This was dropped fairly early on (apparently because it was poorly understood how the plates were embedded in the skin and they were thought to overlap too much in this arrangement). It was revived, in somewhat modified form, in the 1980s, by Stephen Czerkas, based on the arrangement of iguana dorsal spines.
- The plates were paired in a double row along the back, such as in Knight's 1901 reconstruction and the 1933 film King Kong.
- Two rows of alternating plates. By the early 1960s, this had become (and remains) the prevalent idea, mainly because some S. stenops fossils in which the plates are still partially articulated show this arrangement. This arrangement is chiral and so demands that a specimen be distinguished from its distinct, hypothetical mirror-image form.

=== Second dinosaur rush ===
After the end of the Bone Wars, many major institutions in the eastern United States were inspired by the depictions and finds by Marsh and Cope to assemble their own dinosaur fossil collections. The competition was foremost started by the American Museum of Natural History, the Carnegie Museum of Natural History, and the Field Museum of Natural History which all sent expeditions to the west to make their own dinosaur collections and mount skeletons in their fossil halls. The American Museum of Natural History was the first to launch an expedition in 1897, finding several assorted, but incomplete, Stegosaurus specimens at Bone Cabin Quarry in Como Bluff. These remains haven't been described and were mounted in 1932, the mount being a composite primarily of specimens AMNH 650 & 470 from Bone Cabin Quarry. The AMNH mount is cast and on display at the Field Museum, which didn't collect any Stegosaurus skeletons during the Second Dinosaur Rush. The Carnegie Museum in Pittsburgh on the other hand collected many Stegosaurus specimens, first at Freezout Hills in Carbon County, Wyoming in 1902–03. The fossils included only a couple postcranial remains, though in the 1900s-1920s Carnegie crews at Dinosaur National Monument discovered dozens of Stegosaurus specimens in one of the greatest single sites for the taxon. CM 11341, the most complete skeleton found at the quarry, was used for the basis of a composite Stegosaurus mount in 1940 along with several other specimens to finish the mount. A cranium (CM 12000) was also found by Carnegie crews, one of the few known. Both the AMNH and CM material has been referred to Stegosaurus ungulatus.

=== Resurgent discoveries ===
As part of the Dinosaur Renaissance and the resurgent interest in dinosaurs by museums and the public, fossils of Stegosaurus were once again being collected, though few have been fully described. An important discovery came in 1937 again at Garden Park by a high school teacher named Frank Kessler in while leading a nature hike. Kessler contacted the Denver Museum of Nature and Science, who sent paleontologist Robert Landberg. Landberg excavated the skeleton with the DMNS crews, recovering a 70% complete Stegosaurus skeleton along with turtles, crocodiles, and isolated dinosaur fossils at the quarry that would be nicknamed "The Kessler Site". Phillip Reinheimer, a steel worker, mounted the Stegosaurus skeleton at the DMNS in 1938. The skeleton remained mounted until 1989 when the museum curator of the DMNS began a revision of the museum's fossil hall and dispatched an expedition to find additional Stegosaurus remains. The expedition was successful in finding a nearly complete Stegosaurus near the Kessler site by Bryan Small, who would become the eponym of the new site. The "Small Quarry" Stegosaurus' articulation and completeness clarified the position of plates and spikes on the back of Stegosaurus and the position and size of the throat ossicles found earlier first by Felch with the Stegosaurus stenops holotype, though like the S. stenops type, the fossils were flattened in a "roadkill" condition. The Stegosaurus skeletons have been mounted alongside an Allosaurus skeleton collected in Moffat County, Colorado originally in 1979.

Stegosaurus was made the official state fossil of Colorado in 1982, after a two-year campaign begun by a class of 4th graders and their teacher Ruth Sawdo at McElwain Elementary School in Thornton, Colorado. In 1987, a 40% complete Stegosaurus skeleton was discovered in Rabbit Valley in Mesa County, Colorado, by Harold Bollan near the Dinosaur Journey Museum. The skeleton was nicknamed the "Bollan Stegosaurus" and is in the collections of the Dinosaur Journey Museum. At Jensen-Jensen Quarry, an articulated torso including several dorsal plates from a small individual were collected and briefly described in 2014, though the specimen was collected years before and is still in preparation at Brigham Young University. In 2007, Escaso and colleagues described a Stegosaurus specimen from the Casal Novo locality of Portugal, originally thought to be part of the Alcobaça Formation, and subsequently suggested to be part of the Lourinhã Formation. Identified as Stegosaurus cf. ungulatus, the specimen is one of the few associated skeletons known for this genus, containing a tooth, 13 vertebrae, partial limbs, a cervical plate, and several associated postcranial elements.

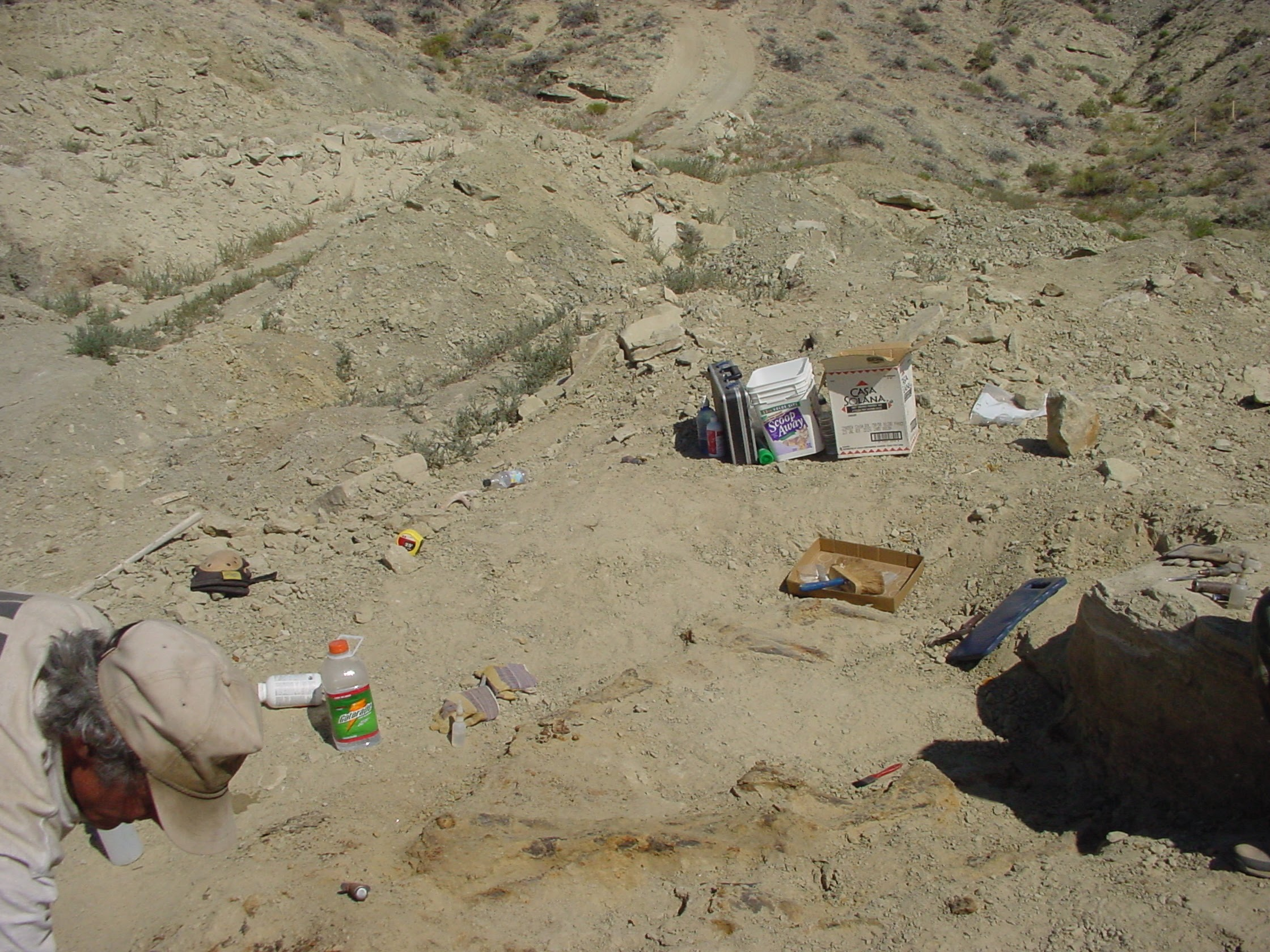
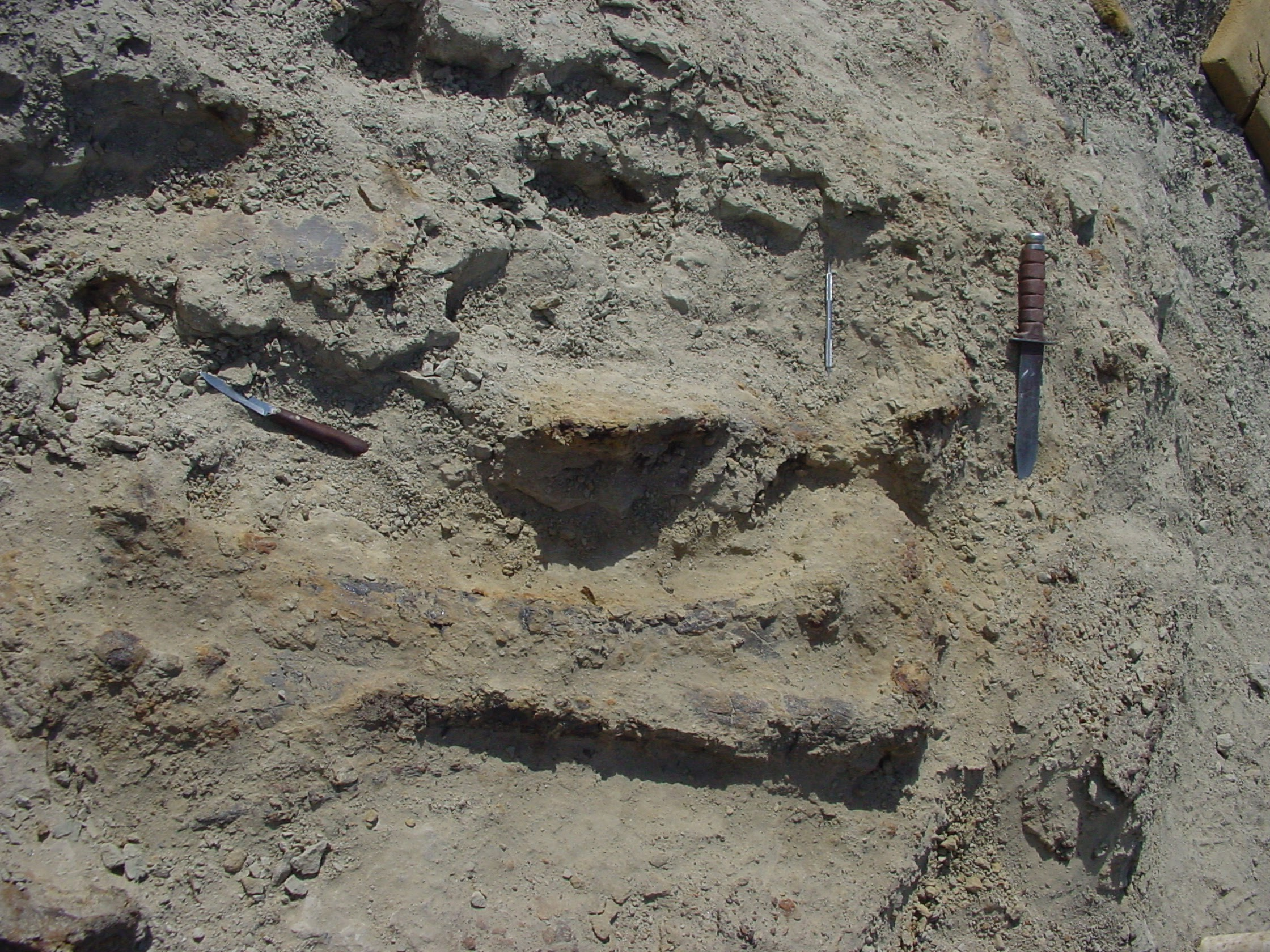
Excavation of the Stegosaurus "Sophie" in 2004. Top: Excavation site with bones visible that are still enclosed in rock. Bottom: Detail of leg bones.

Sophie the Stegosaurus is the best preserved Stegosaurus specimen, being 85% intact and containing 360 bones. Sophie was first discovered by Bob Simon in 2003 at a quarry on the Red Canyon Ranch near Shell, Wyoming, and was excavated by crews from the Swiss Sauriermuseum in 2004 and later prepared by museum staff, who gave it the nickname Sarah after the landowner's daughter. The skeleton had been excavated on private land and was available for purchase. The Natural History Museum, London worked with private donors, most notably Jeremy Herrmann, to find the funding and then arranged to purchase the specimen, which was given the new official museum collection specimen designation NHMUK PV R36730 and re-nicknamed Sophie after Jeremy Herrmann's daughter. The mounted skeleton went on display in December 2014 and was scientifically described in 2015. It is a young adult of undetermined sex, 5.8 m (19 ft) long and 2.9 m (9.5 ft) tall. The Sauriermuseum found several partial Stegosaurid skeletons throughout their excavations at Howe Quarry, Wyoming in the 1990s, though only Sophie has been described in detail. One skeleton collected at the site known as "Victoria" is very well preserved including many of the vertebrae preserved in semi-articulation and next to an Allosaurus skeleton found nicknamed "Big Al II".

On July 17, 2024, a nearly complete, 27-foot (8.2m) long Stegosaurus skeleton, nicknamed "Apex", fetched $44.6m (£34m) at a Sotheby's auction in New York City–the most ever paid for a fossil. The specimen had been discovered in 2022 on private land in Colorado and so could be sold to a private owner. The current owner has made "Apex" available for scientific research, but private ownership of important fossil specimens is controversial, with many researchers insisting that fossils be permanently curated at a formal institution for universal scientific access.

== Description ==
Size of S. ungulatus (orange) and S. stenops (green) compared to a human

The quadrupedal Stegosaurus is one of the most easily identifiable dinosaur genera, due to the distinctive double row of kite-shaped plates rising vertically along the rounded back and the two pairs of long spikes extending horizontally near the end of the tail. S. stenops reached 6.5 m (21.3 ft) in length and 3.5 metric tons (3.9 short tons) in body mass, while S. ungulatus reached 7 m (23.0 ft) in length and 3.8 metric tons (4.2 short tons) in body mass. Some large individuals may have reached 7.5–9 m (25–30 ft) in length and 5.0–5.3 metric tons (5.5–5.8 short tons) in body mass.

Most of the information known about Stegosaurus comes from the remains of mature animals; more recently, though, juvenile remains of Stegosaurus have been found. One subadult specimen, discovered in 1994 in Wyoming, is 4.6 m (15.1 ft) long and 2 m (6.6 ft) high, and is estimated to have weighed 1.5-2.2 metric tons (1.6-2.4 short tons) while alive. It is on display in the University of Wyoming Geological Museum.

=== Skull ===
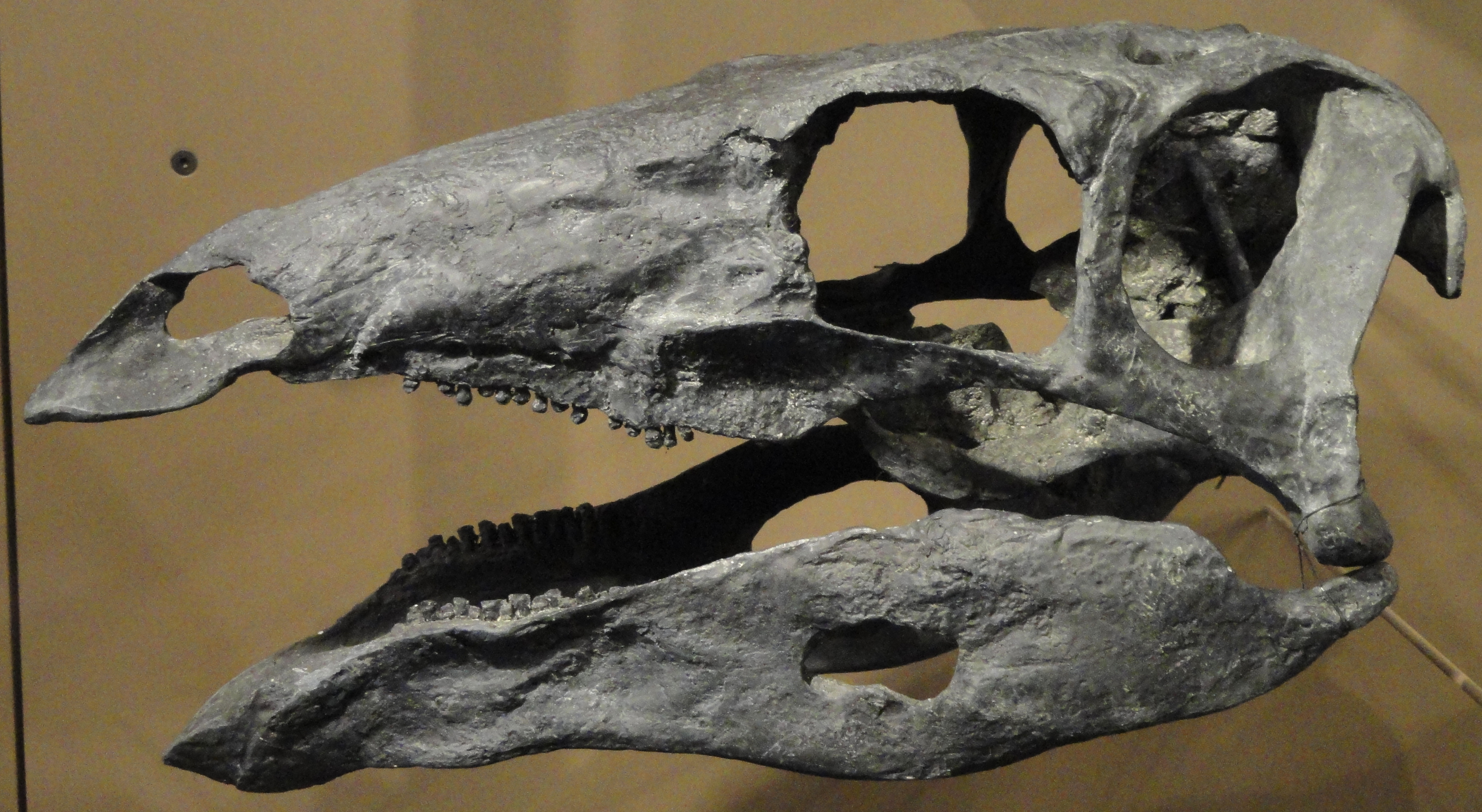
S. stenops skull cast, Natural History Museum of Utah

The long and narrow skull was small in proportion to the body. It had a small antorbital fenestra, the hole between the nose and eye common to most archosaurs, including modern birds, though lost in extant crocodylians. The skull's low position suggests that Stegosaurus may have been a browser of low-growing vegetation. This interpretation is supported by the absence of front teeth and their likely replacement by a horny beak or rhamphotheca. The lower jaw had flat downward and upward extensions that would have completely hidden the teeth when viewed from the side, and these probably supported a turtle-like beak in life. The presence of a beak extended along much of the jaws may have precluded the presence of cheeks in these species. Such an extensive beak was probably unique to Stegosaurus and some other advanced stegosaurids among ornithischians, which usually had beaks restricted to the jaw tips. Other researchers have interpreted these ridges as modified versions of similar structures in other ornithischians which might have supported fleshy cheeks, rather than beaks. Stegosaurian teeth were small, triangular, and flat; wear facets show that they did grind their food.

Despite the animal's overall size, the braincase of Stegosaurus was small, being no larger than that of a dog. A well-preserved Stegosaurus braincase allowed Othniel Charles Marsh to obtain, in the 1880s, a cast of the brain cavity or endocast of the animal, which gave an indication of the brain size. The endocast showed the brain was indeed very small, the smallest proportionally of all dinosaur endocasts then known. The fact that an animal weighing over 4.5 metric tons (5 short tons) could have a brain of no more than 80 g (2.8 oz) contributed to the popular old idea that all dinosaurs were unintelligent, an idea now largely rejected. Actual brain anatomy in Stegosaurus is poorly known, but the brain itself was small even for a dinosaur.

=== Skeleton ===
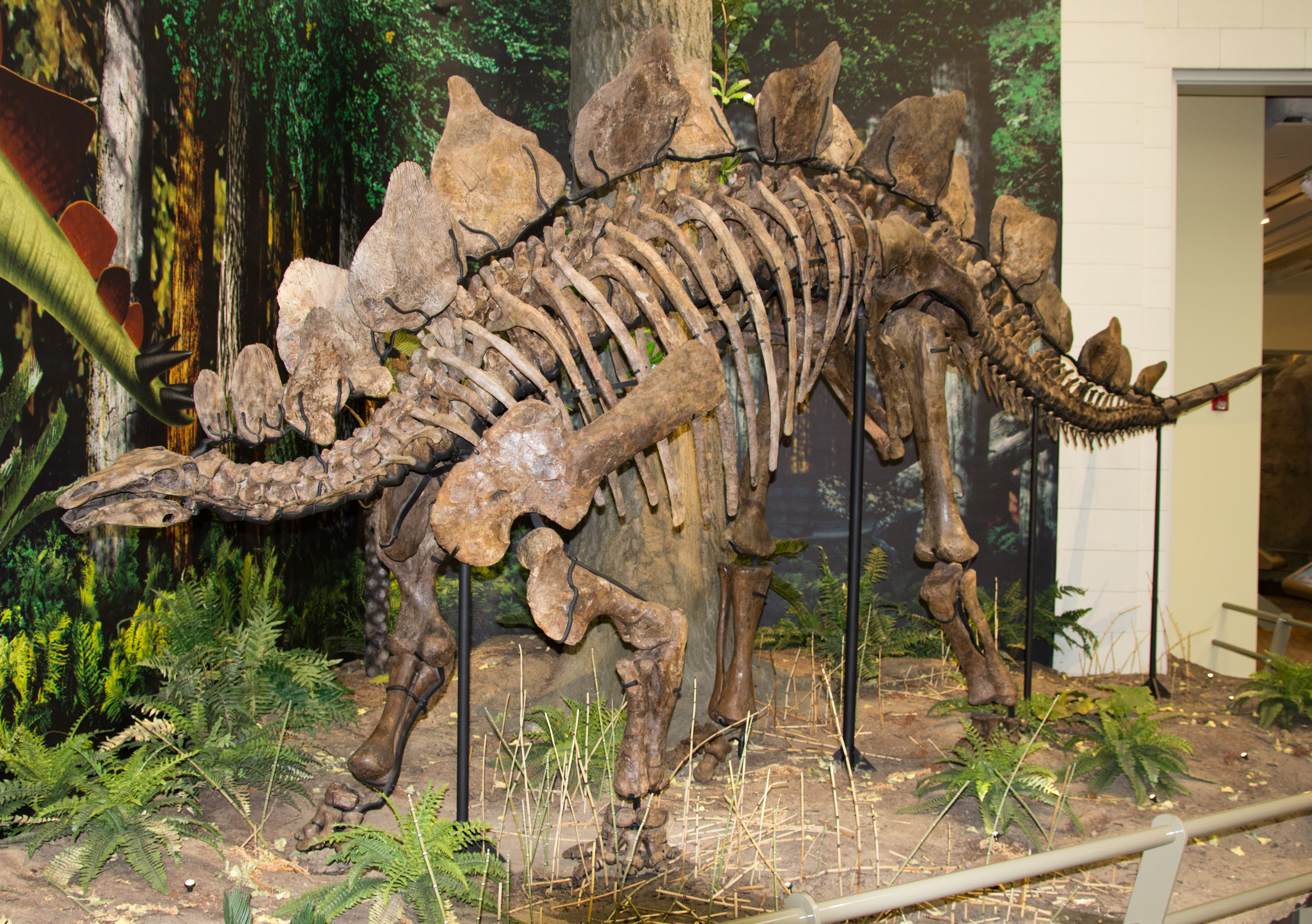
Mounted composite skeleton referred to S. ungulatus, Carnegie Museum of Natural History

In Stegosaurus stenops there are 27 bones in the vertebral column anterior to the sacrum, a varying number of vertebrae in the sacrum, with four in most subadults, and around 46 caudal (tail) vertebrae. The presacrals are divided into cervical (neck) and dorsal (back) vertebrae, with around 10 cervicals and 17 dorsals, the total number being one greater than in Hesperosaurus, two greater than Huayangosaurus, although Miragaia preserves 17 cervicals and an unknown number of dorsals. The first cervical vertebra is the axis bone, which is connected and often fused to the atlas bone. Farther posteriorly, the proportionately larger the cervicals become, although they do not change greatly in anything other than size. Past the first few dorsals, the centrum of the bones become more elongate front-to-back, and the transverse processes become more elevated dorsal. The sacrum of S. stenops includes four sacral vertebrae, but one of the dorsals is also incorporated into the structure. In some specimens of S. stenops, a caudal is also incorporated, as a caudosacral. In Hesperosaurus there are two dorsosacrals, and only four fused sacrals, but in Kentrosaurus there may be as many as seven vertebrae in the sacrum, with both dorsosacrals and caudosacrals. S. stenops preserves 46 caudal vertebrae, and up to 49, and along the series both the centrums and the neural spines become smaller, until the neural spines disappear at caudal 35. Around the middle of the tail, the neural spines become bifurcated, meaning they are divided near the top.

With multiple well-preserved skeletons, S. stenops preserves all regions of the body, including the limbs. The scapula (shoulder blade) is sub-rectangular, with a robust blade. Though it is not always perfectly preserved, the acromion ridge is slightly larger than in Kentrosaurus. The blade is relatively straight, although it curves towards the back. There is a small bump on the back of the blade, that would have served as the base of the triceps muscle. Articulated with the scapula, the coracoid is sub-circular. The hind feet each had three short toes, while each fore foot had five toes; only the inner two toes had a blunt hoof. The phalangeal formula is 2-2-2-2-1, meaning the innermost finger of the fore limb has two bones, the next has two, etc. All four limbs were supported by pads behind the toes. The fore limbs were much shorter than the stocky hind limbs, which resulted in an unusual posture. The tail appears to have been held well clear of the ground, while the head of Stegosaurus was positioned relatively low down, probably no higher than 1 m (3.3 ft) above the ground.

=== Plates ===
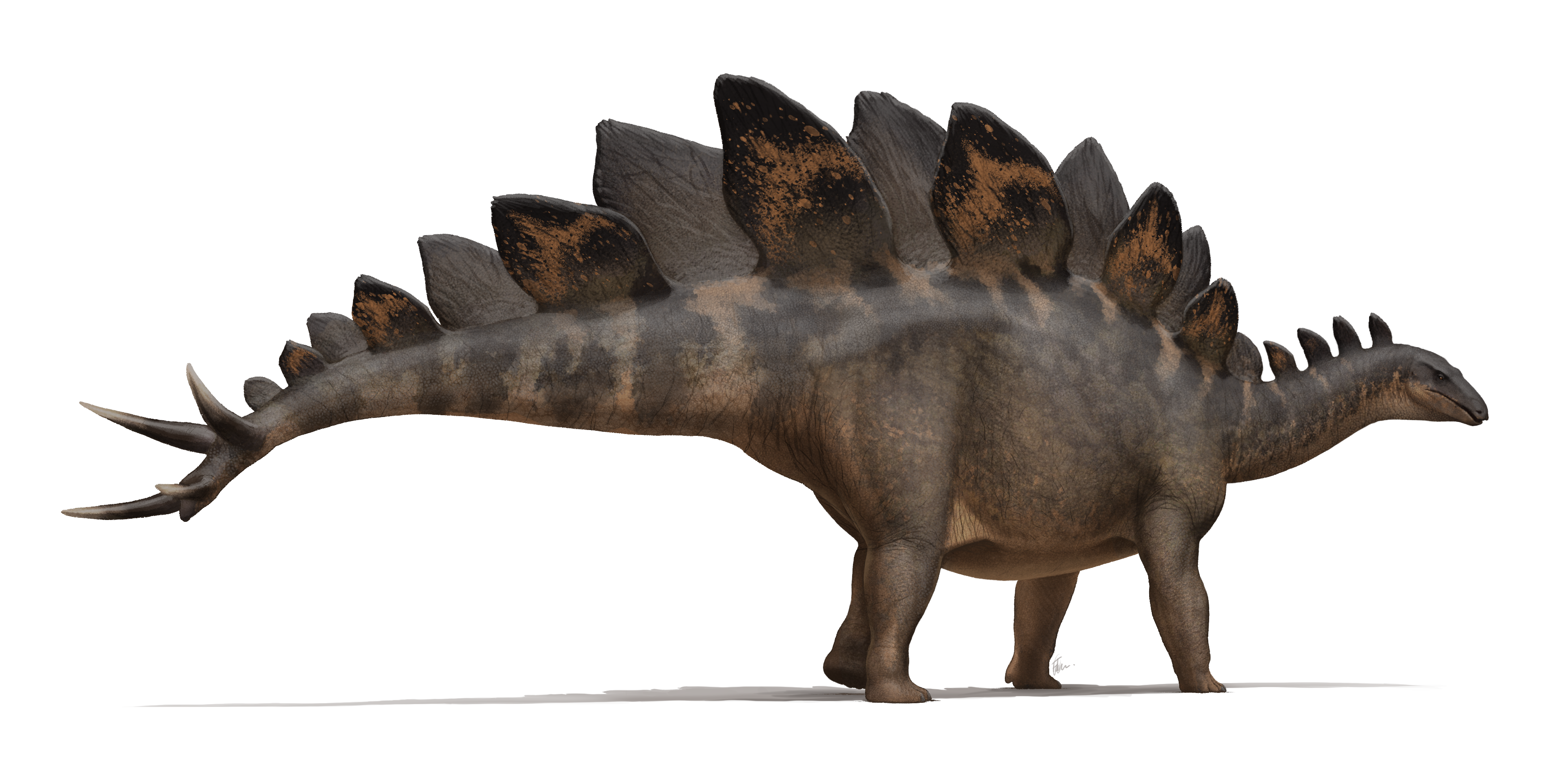
Life restoration of Sophie, depicting the modern view of S. stenops

The most recognizable features of Stegosaurus are its dermal plates, which consisted of between 17 and 22 separate plates and flat spines. These were highly modified osteoderms (bony-cored scales), similar to those seen in crocodiles and many lizards today. They were not directly attached to the animal's skeleton, instead arising from the skin. The largest plates were found over the hips and could measure over 60 cm (24 in) wide and 100 cm (39 in) tall.

In a 2010 review of Stegosaurus species, Peter Galton suggested that the arrangement of the plates on the back may have varied between species, and that the pattern of plates as viewed in profile may have been important for species recognition. Galton noted that the plates in S. stenops have been found articulated in two staggered rows, rather than paired. Fewer S. ungulatus plates have been found, and none articulated, making the arrangement in this species more difficult to determine. However, the type specimen of S. ungulatus preserves two flattened spine-like plates from the tail that are nearly identical in shape and size, but are mirror images of each other, suggesting that at least these were arranged in pairs. Many of the plates are manifestly chiral and no two plates of the same size and shape have been found for an individual; however plates have been correlated between individuals. Well preserved integumentary impressions of the plates of Hesperosaurus show a smooth surface with long and parallel, shallow grooves. This indicates that the plates were covered in keratinous sheaths.

== Classification and species ==
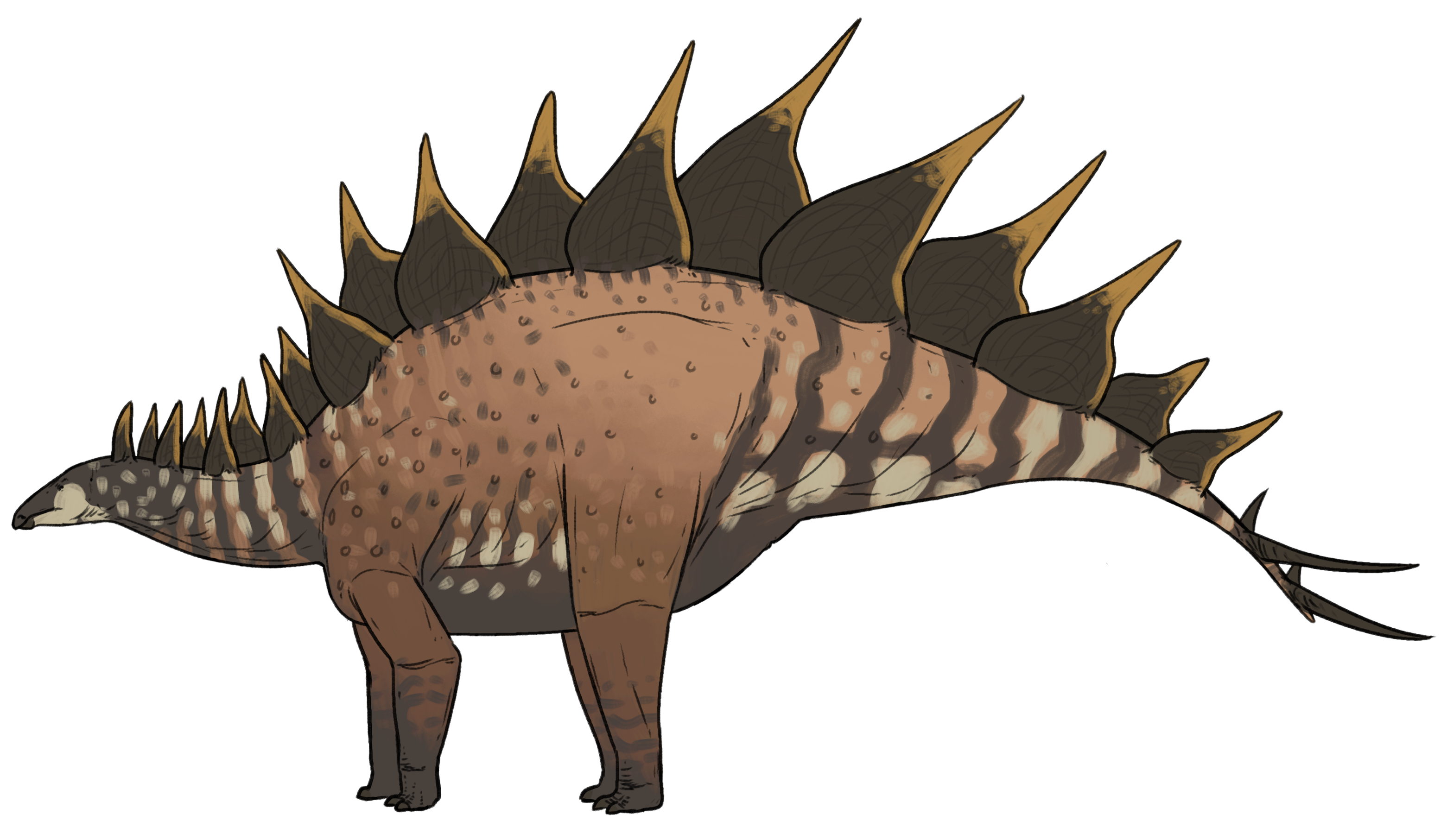
Restoration of S. ungulatus

Like the spikes and shields of ankylosaurs, the bony plates and spines of stegosaurians evolved from the low-keeled osteoderms characteristic of basal thyreophorans. Galton (2019) interpreted plates of an armored dinosaur from the Lower Jurassic (Sinemurian-Pliensbachian) Lower Kota Formation of India as fossils of a member of Ankylosauria; the author argued that this finding indicates a probable early Early Jurassic origin for both Ankylosauria and its sister group Stegosauria.

The vast majority of stegosaurian dinosaurs thus far recovered belong to the Stegosauridae, which lived in the later part of the Jurassic and Early Cretaceous, and which were defined by Paul Sereno as all stegosaurians more closely related to Stegosaurus than to Huayangosaurus. This group is widespread, with members across the Northern Hemisphere, Africa and possibly South America. Stegosaurus frequently is discovered in a clade within the Stegosauridae called Stegosaurinae, usually including the taxa Wuerhosaurus and Hesperosaurus.

In 2017, Raven and Maidment published a phylogenetic analysis including almost every known stegosaurian genus. Their dataset was expanded upon in the following years with additional taxa. In their 2025 description of some European stegosaur fossils, Sánchez-Fenollosa & Cobos used an expanded matrix incorporating data from Raven and Maidment to analyze the phylogenetic relations of the Stegosauria:

- Stegosauria
  - Huayangosauridae
    - Isaberrysaura
    - - - Bashanosaurus
        - Huayangosaurus
      - - Baiyinosaurus
        - Gigantspinosaurus
  - Stegosauridae
    - Chungkingosaurus
    - - - Tuojiangosaurus
        - Paranthodon
      - Neostegosauria
        - Dacentrurinae
          - Alcovasaurus
          - - Kentrosaurus
            - - Thyreosaurus
              - - Adratiklit
                - Dacentrurus
                  (including Miragaia)
        - Stegosaurinae
          - - - Qigu Formation stegosaur
              - Loricatosaurus
            - - Hesperosaurus
              - Stegosaurus stenops
          - - Jiangjunosaurus
            - - Hekou Group stegosaur
              - - Wuerhosaurus homheni
                - Yanbeilong

=== Species ===
Many of the species initially described have since been considered to be invalid or synonymous with earlier named species, leaving two well-known and one poorly known species. Confirmed Stegosaurus remains have been found in the Morrison Formation's stratigraphic zones 2–6, with additional remains possibly referrable to Stegosaurus recovered from stratigraphic zone 1.

- Stegosaurus stenops, meaning "narrow-faced roof lizard", was named by Marsh in 1887, with the holotype having been collected by Marshall Felch at Garden Park, north of Cañon City, Colorado, in 1886. This is the best-known species of Stegosaurus, mainly because its remains include at least one complete articulated skeleton. It had proportionately large, broad plates and rounded tail plates. Articulated specimens show that the plates were arranged alternating in a staggered double row. S. stenops is known from at least 50 partial skeletons of adults and juveniles, one complete skull, and four partial skulls. It was shorter than other species, at 6.5 m (21 ft). Found in the Morrison Formation, Colorado, Wyoming, and Utah.
- Stegosaurus ungulatus, meaning "hoofed roof lizard", was named by Marsh in 1879, from remains recovered at Como Bluff, Wyoming (Quarry 12, near Robber's Roost). It might be synonymous with S. stenops, although this hypothesis has not been widely accepted by other researchers. At 7–9 m (23.0–29.5 ft) in length and 6.9 tonnes (7.6 short tons) in weight, it was the largest species within the genus Stegosaurus. A fragmentary Stegosaurus specimen discovered in Portugal and dating from the upper Kimmeridgian-lower Tithonian stage has been tentatively assigned to this species. Stegosaurus ungulatus can be distinguished from S. stenops by the presence of longer hind limbs, proportionately smaller, more pointed plates with wide bases and narrow tips, various vertebral features, and by several small, flat, spine-like plates just before the spikes on the tail. These spine-like plates appear to have been paired, due to the presence of at least one pair that are identical but mirrored. S. ungulatus also appears to have had longer legs (femora) and hip bones than other species. The type specimen of S. ungulatus was discovered with eight spikes, though they were scattered away from their original positions. These have often been interpreted as indicating that the animal had four pairs of tail spikes. No specimens have been found with complete or articulated sets of tail spikes, but no additional specimens have been found that preserve eight spikes together. It is possible the extra pair of spikes came from a different individual, and though no other extra bones were found with the specimen, these may be found if more digging were done at the original site. Specimens from other quarries (such as a tail from Quarry 13, now forming part of the composite skeleton AMNH 650 at the American Museum of Natural History), referred to S. ungulatus on the basis of their notched tail vertebrae, are preserved with only four tail spikes. The type specimen of S. ungulatus (YPM 1853) was incorporated into the first ever mounted skeleton of a stegosaur at the Peabody Museum of Natural History in 1910 by Richard Swann Lull. It was initially mounted with paired plates set wide, above the base of the ribs, but was remounted in 1924 with two staggered rows of plates along the midline of the back. Additional specimens recovered from the same quarry by the United States National Museum of Natural History, including tail vertebrae and an additional large plate (USNM 7414), belong to the same individual as YPM 1853.
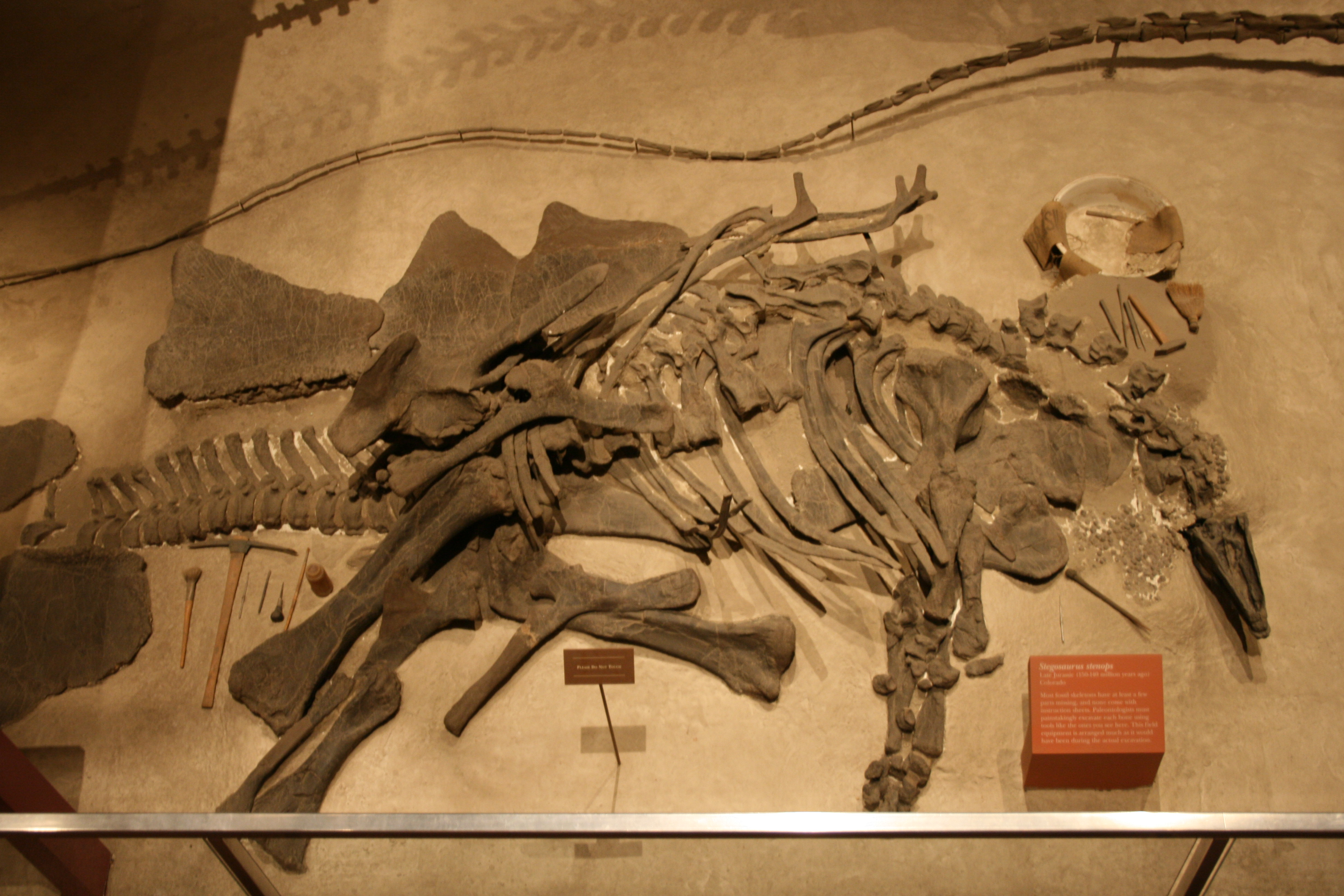
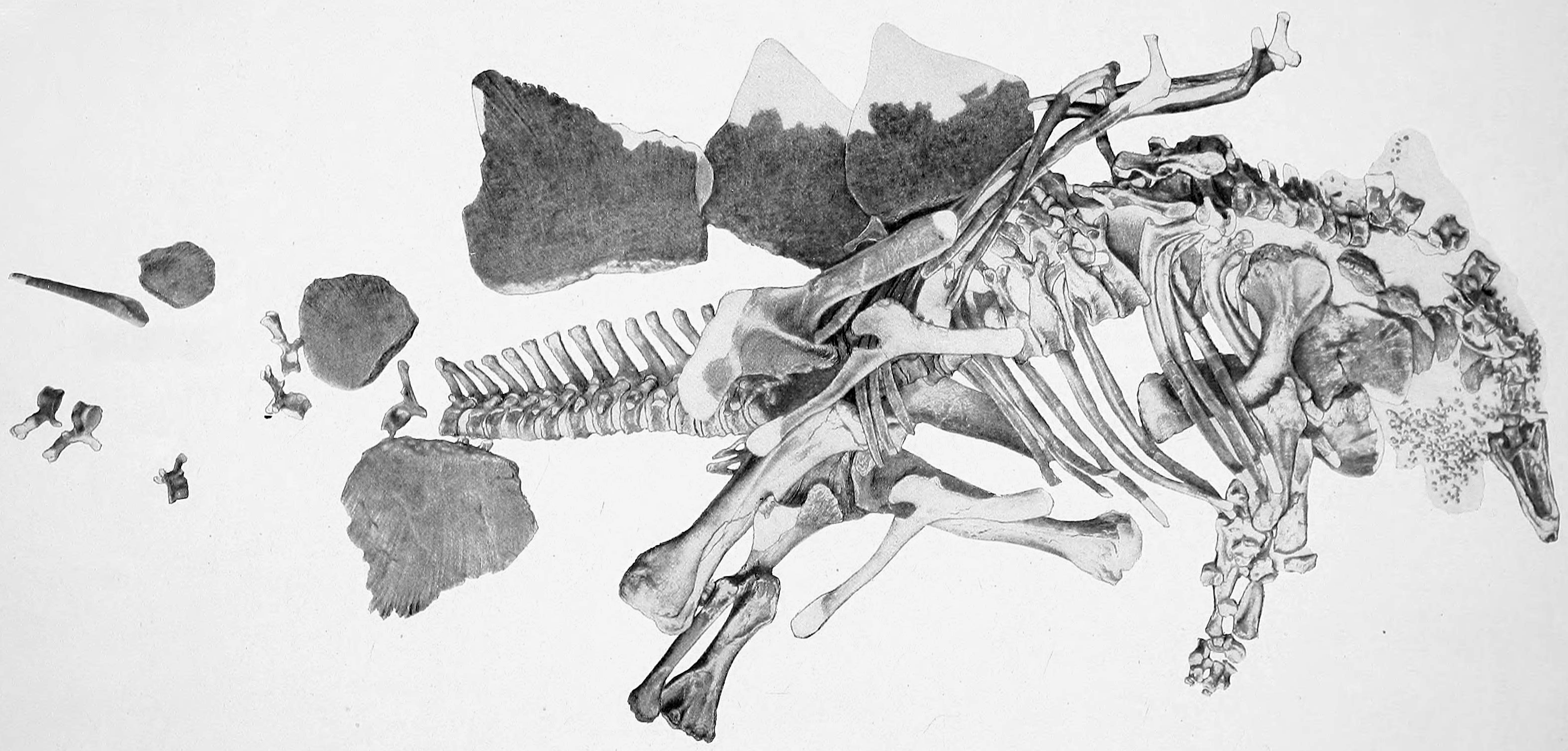
Type specimen of S. stenops on display at the National Museum of Natural History
- Stegosaurus sulcatus, meaning "furrowed roof lizard", was described by Marsh in 1887 based on a partial skeleton. It has traditionally been considered a synonym of S. armatus, though more recent studies suggest it is not. S. sulcatus is distinguished mainly by its unusually large, furrowed spikes with very large bases. A spike associated with the type specimen, originally thought to be a tail spike, may in fact come from the shoulder or hip, since its base is much larger than the corresponding tail vertebrae. A review published by Maidment and colleagues in 2008 regarded it as an indeterminate species possibly not even belonging to Stegosaurus at all, but to a different genus. Peter Galton suggested it should be considered a valid species due to its unique spikes.

In 2008, Susannah Maidment and colleagues proposed extensive alterations to the taxonomy of Stegosaurus. They advocated synonymizing S. stenops and S. ungulatus with S. armatus, and sinking Hesperosaurus and Wuerhosaurus into Stegosaurus, with their type species becoming Stegosaurus mjosi and Stegosaurus homheni, respectively. They regarded S. longispinus as dubious. Thus, their conception of Stegosaurus would include three valid species (S. armatus, S. homheni, and S. mjosi) and would range from the Late Jurassic of North America and Europe to the Early Cretaceous of Asia. However, this classification scheme has not been followed by other researchers, and a 2017 cladistic analysis co-authored by Maidment with Thomas Raven rejects the synonymy of Hesperosaurus with Stegosaurus. In 2015, Maidment et al. revised their suggestion due to the recognition by Galton of S. armatus as a nomen dubium and its replacement by S. stenops as type species.

=== Doubtful species and junior synonyms ===
- Stegosaurus armatus, meaning "armored roof lizard", was the first species to be found and the original type species named by O.C. Marsh in 1877. It is known from a partial skeleton, and more than 30 fragmentary specimens have been referred to it. However, the type specimen was very fragmentary, consisting only of a partial tail, hips, and leg, parts of some back vertebrae, and a single fragmentary plate (the presence of which was used to give the animal its name). No other plates or spikes were found, and the entire front half of the animal appears not to have been preserved. Because the type specimen is very fragmentary, it is extremely difficult to compare it with other species based on better specimens, and it is now generally considered to be a nomen dubium. Because of this, it was replaced by S. stenops as the type species of Stegosaurus in a ruling of the ICZN in 2013.
- Stegosaurus "affinis", named by Marsh in 1881, is only known from a pubis which has since been lost. Because Marsh did not provide an adequate description of the bone with which to distinguish a new species, this name is considered a nomen nudum.
- Diracodon laticeps was described by Marsh in 1881, from some jawbone fragments. Bakker resurrected D. laticeps in 1986 as a senior synonym of S. stenops, although others note that the material is not diagnostic and is only referable to Stegosaurus sp., making it a nomen dubium.
- Stegosaurus duplex, meaning "two plexus roof lizard" (in allusion to the greatly enlarged neural canal of the sacrum which Marsh characterized as a "posterior brain case"), was named by Marsh in 1887 (including the holotype specimen). The disarticulated bones were actually collected in 1879 by Edward Ashley at Como Bluff. Marsh initially distinguished it from S. ungulatus based on the fact that each sacral (hip) vertebra bore its own rib, which he claimed was unlike the anatomy of S. ungulatus; however, the sacrum of S. ungulatus had not actually been discovered. Marsh also suggested that S. duplex may have lacked armor, since no plates or spikes were found with the specimen, though a single spike may actually have been present nearby, and re-examination of the site maps has shown that the entire specimen was found highly disarticulated and scattered. It is generally considered a synonym of S. ungulatus today, and parts of the specimen were actually incorporated into the Peabody Museum S. ungulatus skeletal mount in 1910.

=== Reassigned species ===
- Stegosaurus marshi, which was described by Lucas in 1901, was renamed Hoplitosaurus in 1902.
- Stegosaurus priscus, described by Nopcsa in 1911, was reassigned to Lexovisaurus, and is now the type species of Loricatosaurus.
- Stegosaurus longispinus was named by Charles W. Gilmore in 1914 based on a fragmentary postcranial skeleton that has largely been lost. It is now the type species of the genus Alcovasaurus, regarded as a dacentrurine.
- Stegosaurus madagascariensis from Madagascar is known solely from teeth and was described by Piveteau in 1926. The teeth were variously attributed to a stegosaur, the theropod Majungasaurus, a hadrosaur or even a crocodylian, but is now considered a possible ankylosaur.
- Stegosaurus homheni is an alternative combination for the Chinese Cretaceous stegosaur Wuerhosaurus homheni, which was described based on a partial postcranial skeleton in 1973 by Dong Zhiming. It was referred to Stegosaurus in 2008 by Maidment et al., but the species is generally regarded to be in its own genus.
- Stegosaurus mjosi was described as Hesperosaurus mjosi by Carpenter et al. in 2001 based on a partial skull and incomplete postcranial skeleton from the Morrison Formation of Johnson County, Wyoming. The species was referred to Stegosaurus mostly by Maidment et al. starting in 2008, but Hesperosaurus mjosi has been the more accepted name in subsequent research

== Paleobiology ==
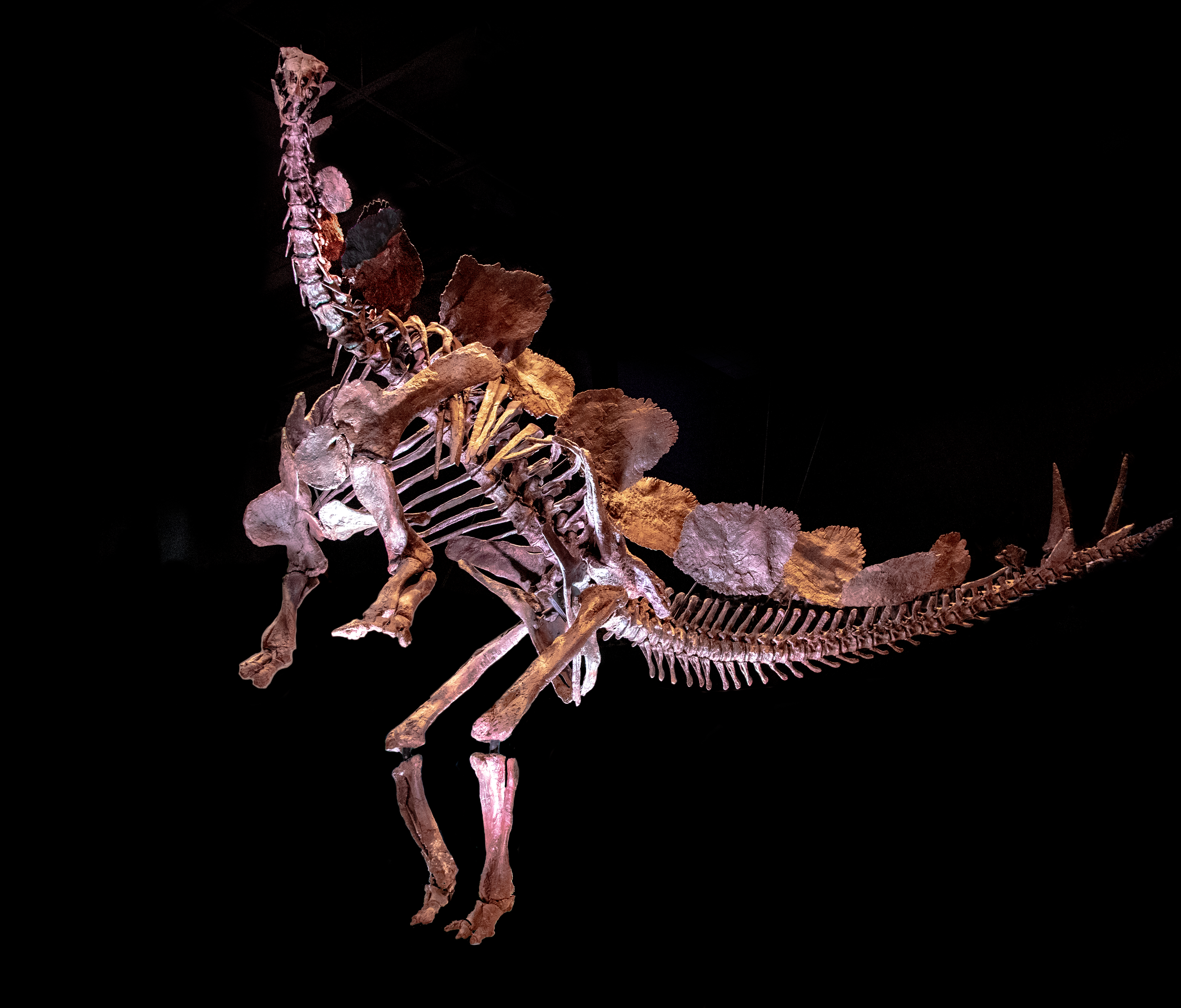
Mounted skeleton in bipedal posture, Houston Museum of Natural Science

=== Posture and movement ===
Soon after its discovery, Marsh considered Stegosaurus to have been bipedal, due to its short forelimbs. He had changed his mind, however, by 1891, after considering the heavy build of the animal. Although Stegosaurus is undoubtedly now considered to have been quadrupedal, some discussion has occurred over whether it could have reared up on its hind legs, using its tail to form a tripod with its hind limbs, to browse for higher foliage. This has been proposed by Bakker and opposed by Carpenter. A study by Mallison (2010) found support for a rearing up posture in Kentrosaurus, though not for ability for the tail to act as a tripod.

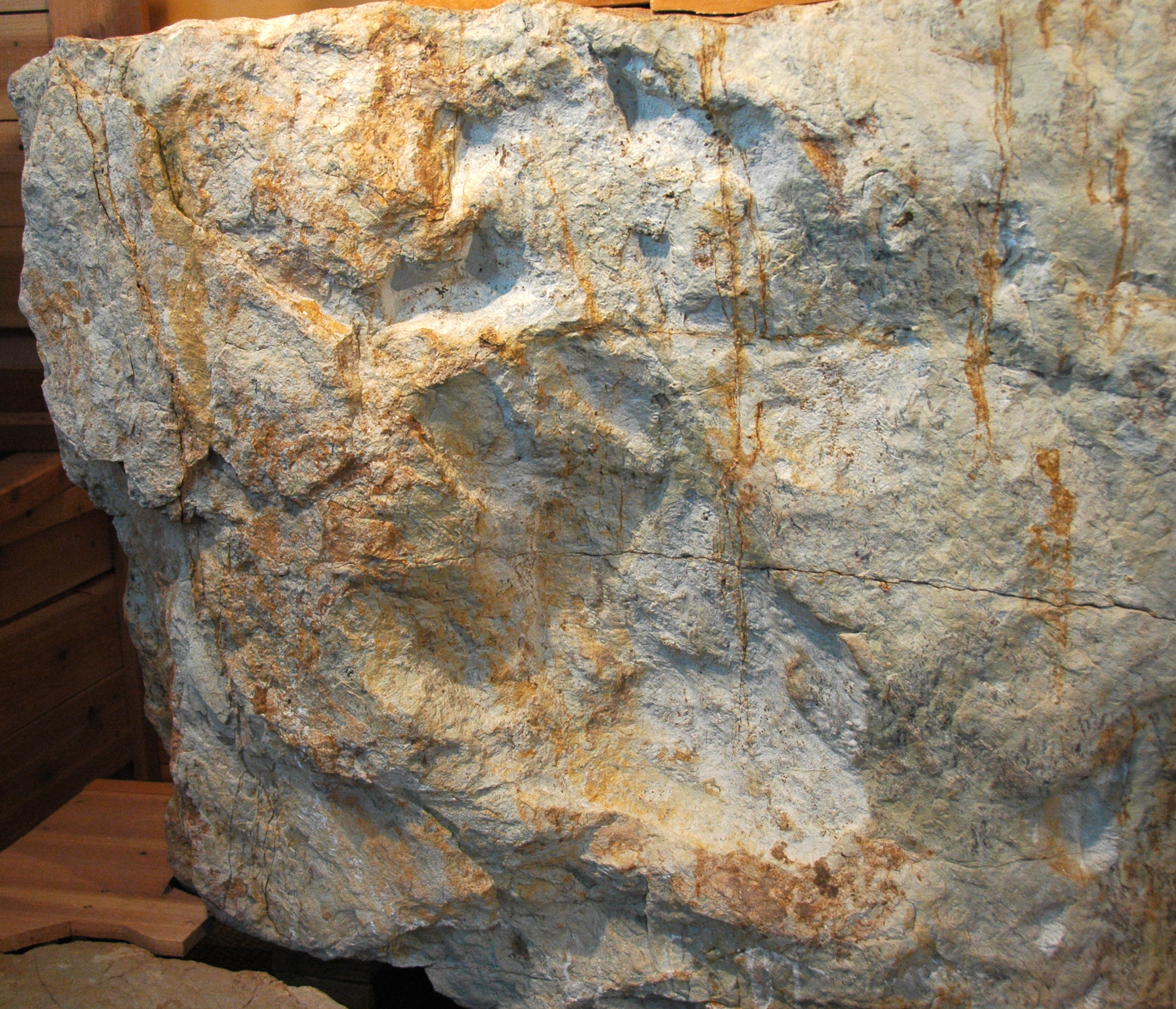
Footprints of an adult and juvenile from the Morrison Formation

Stegosaurus had short fore limbs in relation to its hind limbs. Furthermore, within the hind limbs, the lower section (comprising the tibia and fibula) was short compared with the femur. This suggests it could not walk very fast, as the stride of the back legs at speed would have overtaken the front legs, giving a maximum speed of 15.3–17.9 km/h (9.5–11.1 mph). Tracks discovered by Matthew Mossbrucker (Morrison Natural History Museum, Colorado) suggest that Stegosaurus lived and traveled in multiple-age herds. One group of tracks is interpreted as showing four or five baby stegosaurs moving in the same direction, while another has a juvenile stegosaur track with an adult track overprinting it.

As the plates would have been obstacles during copulation, it is possible the female stegosaur laid on her side as the male entered her from above and behind. Another suggestion is that the female would stand on all fours but squat down the fore limbs and raise the tail up and out of the male's way as he supports his fore limbs on her hips. However, their reproductive organs still could not touch as there is no evidence of muscle attachments for a mobile penis nor a baculum in male dinosaurs.

=== Plate function ===
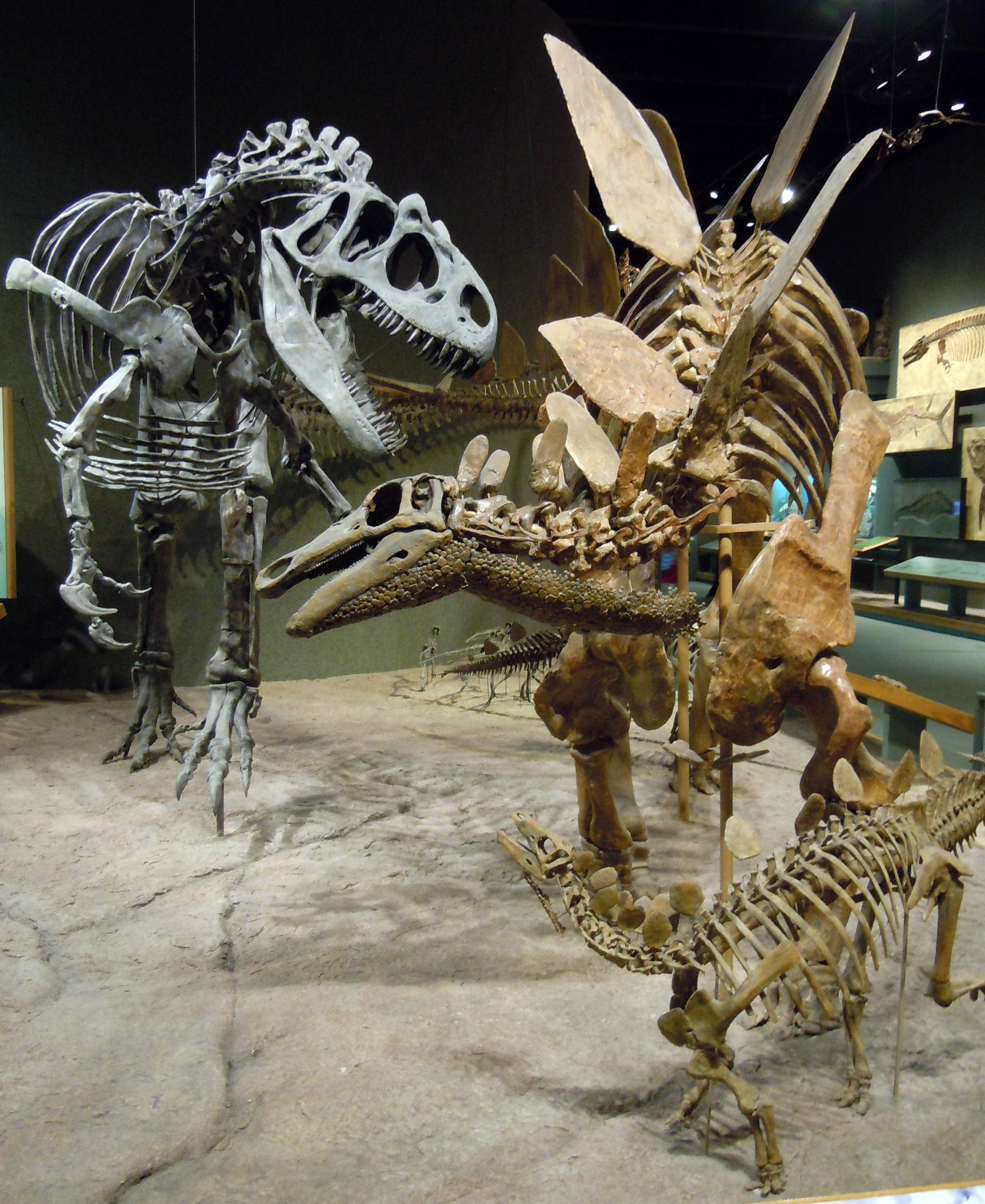
Adult and juvenile S. stenops mounted as if under attack from an Allosaurus fragilis, Denver Museum of Nature and Science

The function of Stegosaurus' plates has been much debated. Marsh suggested that they functioned as some form of armor, though Davitashvili (1961) disputed this, claiming that they were too fragile and ill-placed for defensive purposes, leaving the animal's sides unprotected. Nevertheless, others have continued to support a defensive function. Bakker suggested in 1986 that the plates were covered in horn comparing the surface of the fossilized plates to the bony cores of horns in other animals known or thought to bear horns. Christiansen and Tschopp (2010), having studied a well-preserved specimen of Hesperosaurus with skin impressions, concluded that the plates were covered in a keratin sheath which would have strengthened the plate as a whole and provided it with sharp cutting edges. Bakker stated that Stegosaurus could flip its osteoderms from one side to another to present a predator with an array of spikes and blades that would impede it from closing sufficiently to attack the Stegosaurus effectively. He contends that they had insufficient width for them to stand erect easily in such a manner as to be useful in display without continuous muscular effort. However, mobility of the plates has been disputed by other paleontologists.

Another possible function of the plates could have been helping to control the animal's body temperature, in a similar way to the sails of the pelycosaurs Dimetrodon and Edaphosaurus (and modern elephant and rabbit ears). The plates had blood vessels running through grooves and air flowing around the plates would have cooled the blood. Buffrénil, et al. (1986) found "extreme vascularization of the outer layer of bone", which was seen as evidence that the plates "acted as thermoregulatory devices". Likewise, 2010 structural comparisons of Stegosaurus plates to Alligator osteoderms seem to support the potential for a thermoregulatory role.

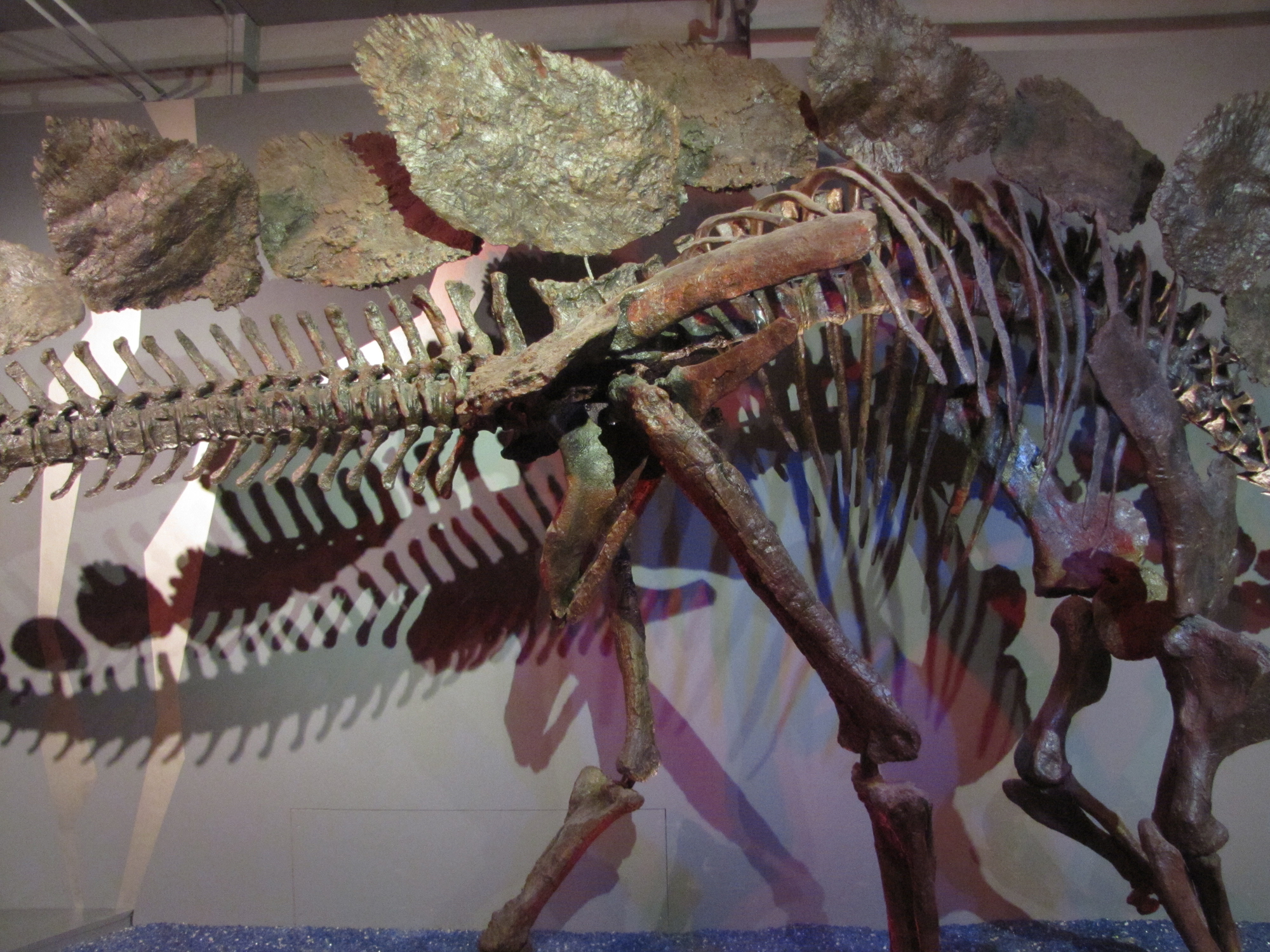
Plates of Stegosaurus specimen "Sophie"

The thermoregulation hypothesis has been seriously questioned, since other stegosaurs such as Kentrosaurus, had more low surface area spikes than plates, implying that cooling was not important enough to require specialized structural formations such as plates. However, it has also been suggested that the plates could have helped the animal increase heat absorption from the sun. Since a cooling trend occurred towards the end of the Jurassic, a large ectothermic reptile might have used the increased surface area afforded by the plates to absorb radiation from the sun. Christiansen and Tschopp (2010) state that the presence of a smooth, insulating keratin covering would have hampered thermoregulation, but such a function cannot be entirely ruled out as extant cattle and ducks use horns and beaks to dump excess heat despite the keratin covering. Histological surveys of plate microstructure attributed the vascularization to the need to transport nutrients for rapid plate growth.

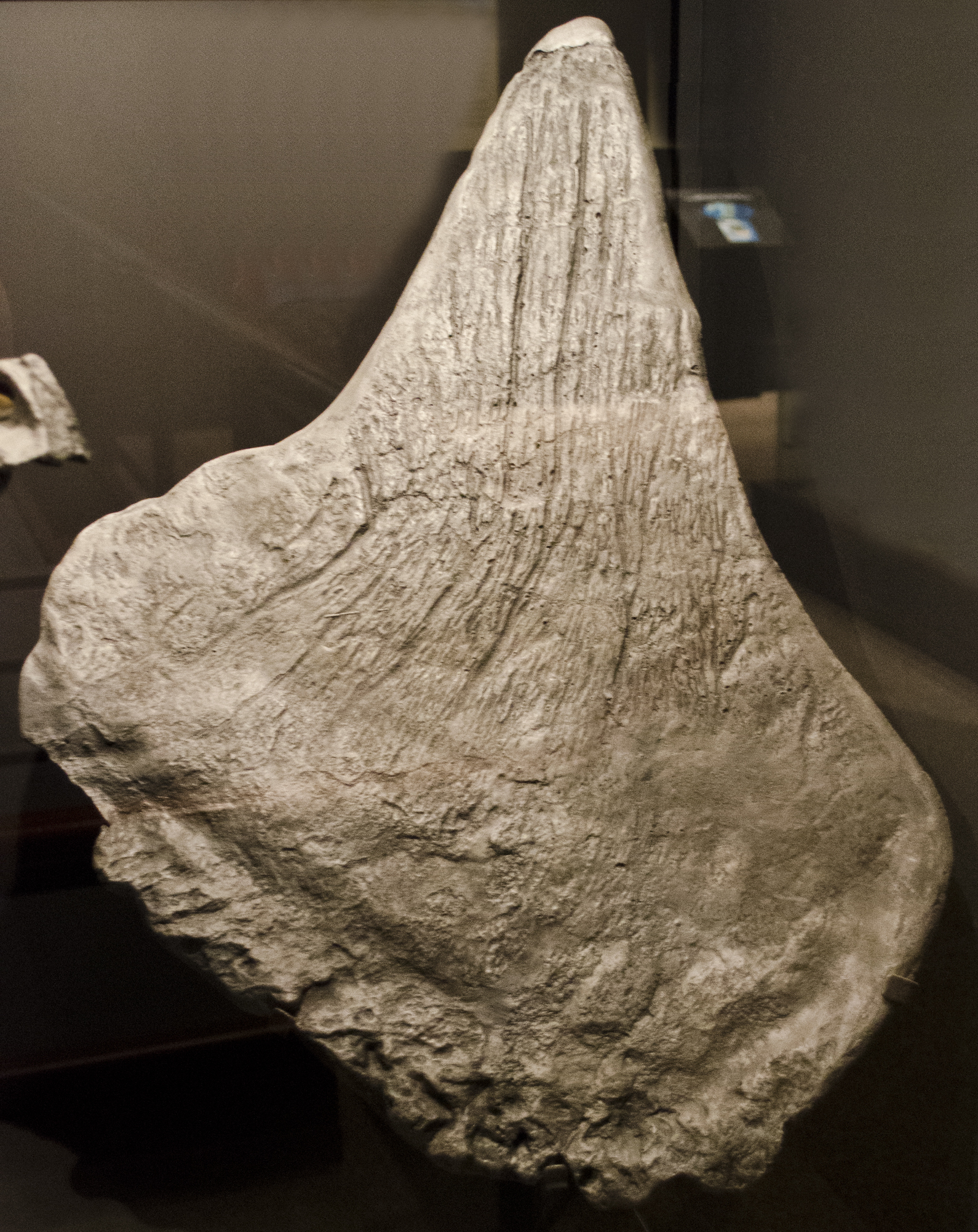
Back plate cast, Museum of the Rockies, Bozeman, Montana

The vascular system of the plates have been theorized to have played a role in threat displaying as Stegosaurus could have pumped blood into them, causing them to "blush" and give a colorful, red warning. However, the stegosaur plates were covered in horn rather than skin. The plates' large size suggests that they may have served to increase the apparent height of the animal, either to intimidate enemies or to impress other members of the same species in some form of sexual display. A 2015 study of the shapes and sizes of Hesperosaurus plates suggested that they were sexually dimorphic, with wide plates belonging to males and taller plates belonging to females. Christiansen and Tschopp (2010) proposed that the display function would have been reinforced by the horny sheath which would have increased the visible surface and such horn structures are often brightly colored. Some have suggested that plates in stegosaurs were used to allow individuals to identify members of their species. However, the use of exaggerated structures in dinosaurs as species identification has been questioned, as no such function exists in modern species.

=== Thagomizer (tail spikes) ===
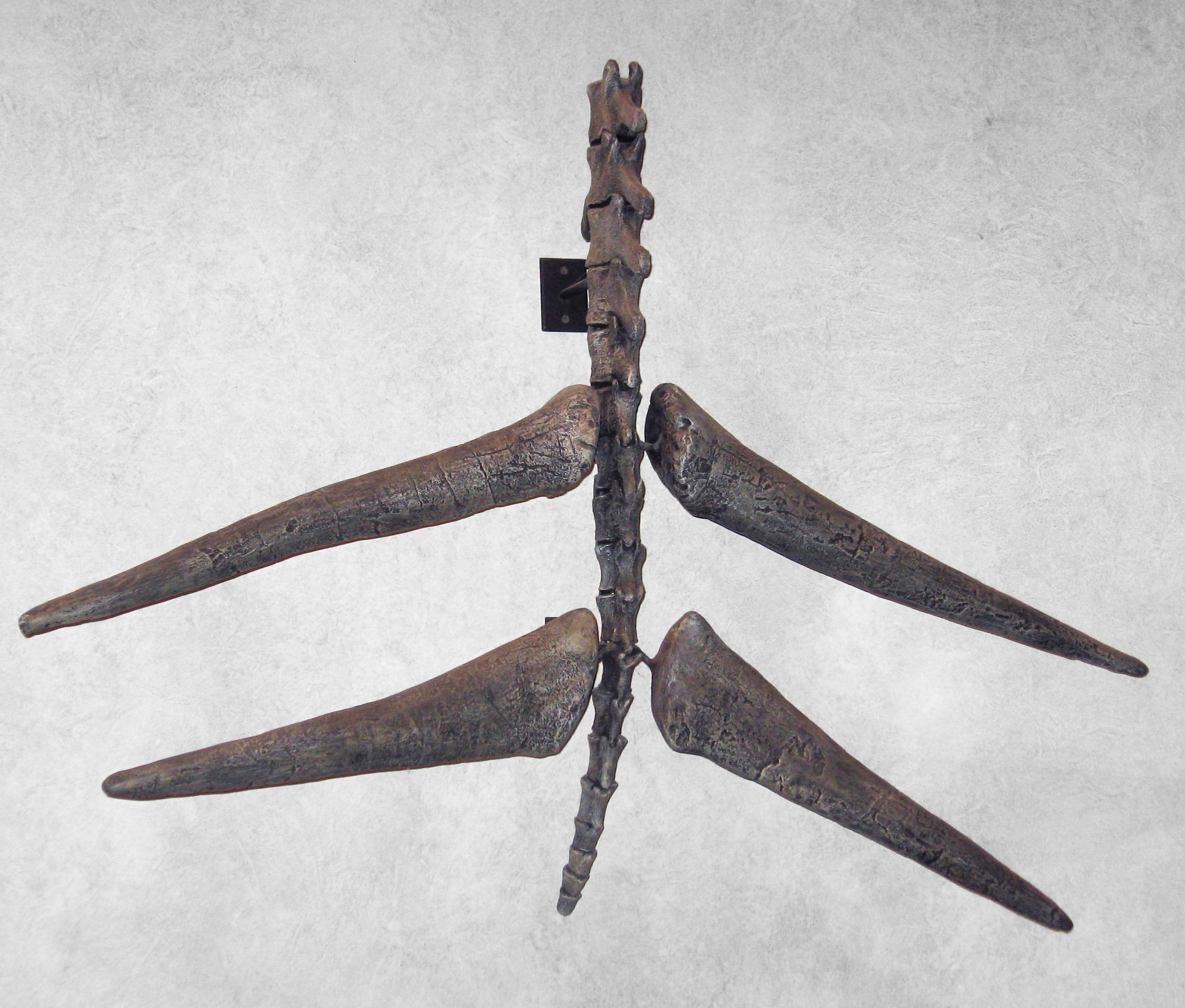
Thagomizer on mounted tail

There has been debate about whether the tail spikes were only used for display, as posited by Gilmore in 1914, or used as a weapon. Robert Bakker noted the tail was likely to have been much more flexible than that of other dinosaurs, as it lacked ossified tendons, thus lending credence to the idea of the tail as a weapon. However, as Carpenter has noted, the plates overlap so many tail vertebrae, movement would be limited. Bakker also observed that Stegosaurus could have maneuvered its rear easily, by keeping its large hind limbs stationary and pushing off with its very powerfully muscled but short forelimbs, allowing it to swivel deftly to deal with attack.

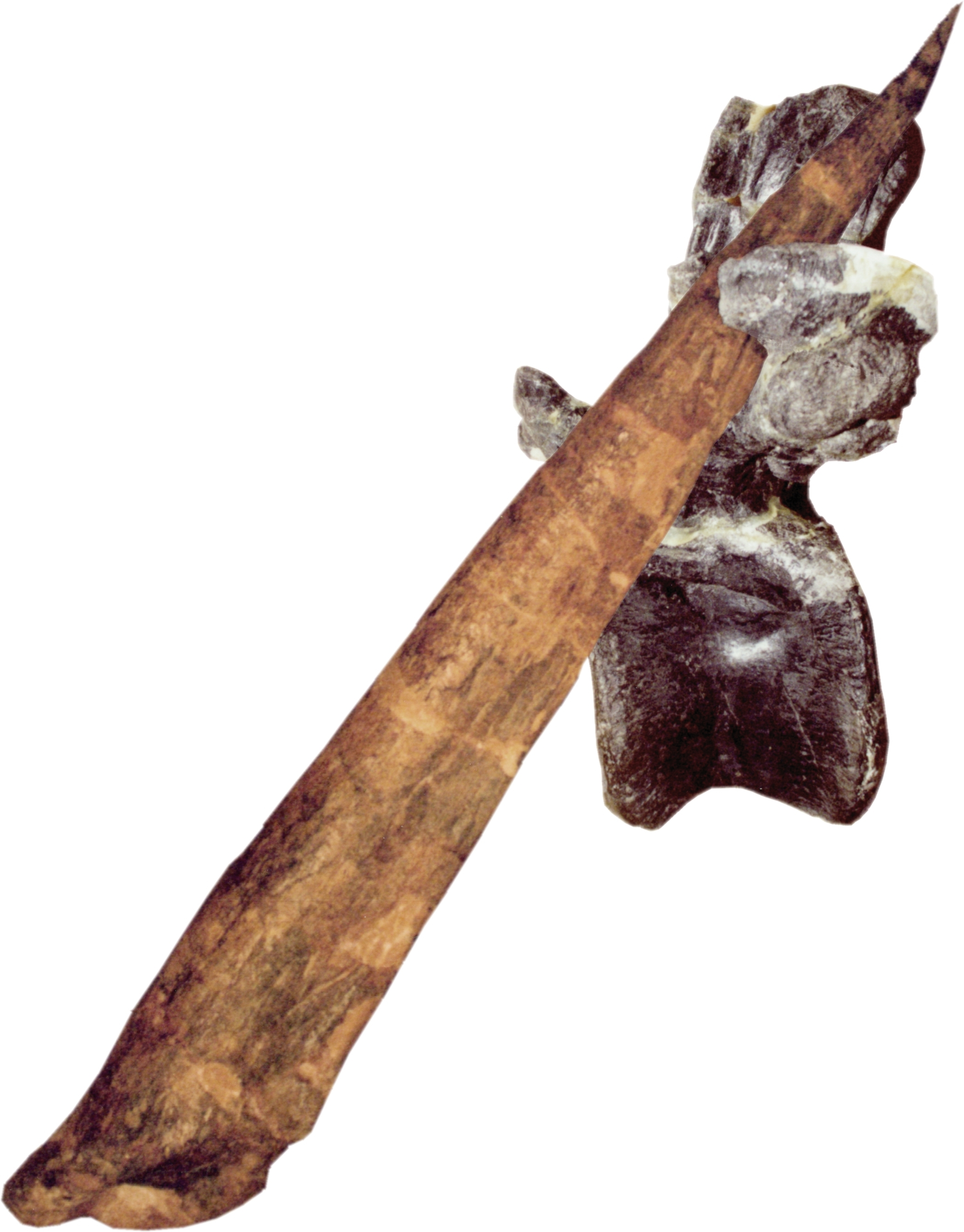
Allosaurus tail vertebra punctured by a Stegosaurus thagomizer

More recently, a study of the tail spikes by McWhinney et al., which showed a high incidence of trauma-related damage, lends more weight to the position that the spikes were indeed used in combat. This study showed that 9.8% of Stegosaurus specimens examined had injuries to their tail spikes. Additional support for this idea was a punctured tail vertebra of an Allosaurus into which a tail spike fits perfectly. The damage shows that the spike entered at an angle from below and displaced a piece of the process upward, remodeled bone on the underside of the process shows that an infection developed. Another Allosaurus specimen was killed when a tail spike impaled its pubis and led to a fatal infection.

S. stenops had four dermal spikes, each about 60–90 cm (2.0–3.0 ft) long. Discoveries of articulated stegosaur armor show, at least in some species, these spikes protruded horizontally from the tail, not vertically as is often depicted. Initially, Marsh described S. ungulatus as having eight spikes in its tail, unlike S. stenops. However, recent research re-examined this and concluded this species also had four.

=== Growth and metabolism ===
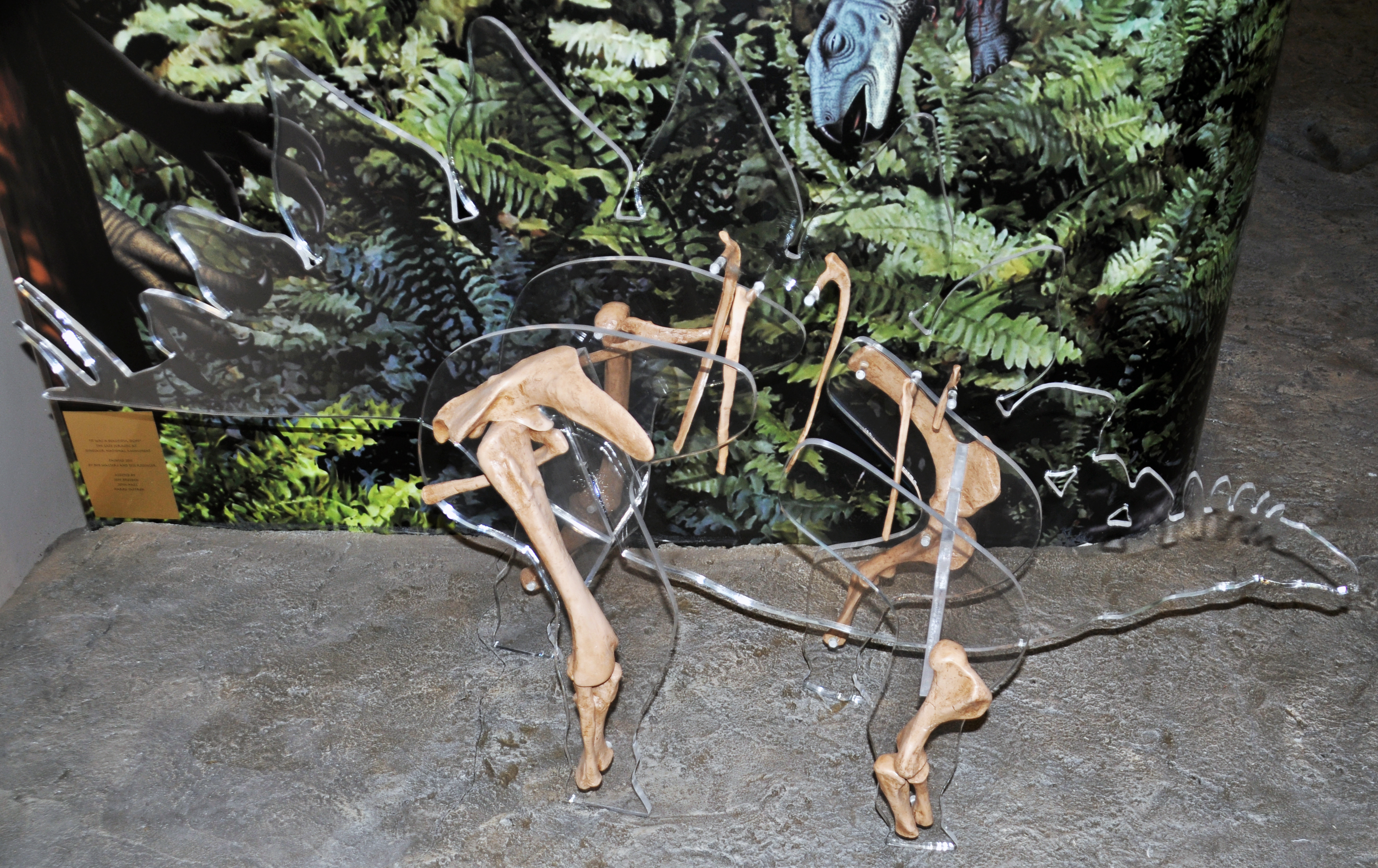
Partial juvenile skeleton on display with cast bones at Dinosaur National Monument in Utah

Juveniles of Stegosaurus have been preserved, probably showing the growth of the genus. The two juveniles are both relatively small, with the smaller individual being 1.5 m (4.9 ft) long, and the larger having a length of 2.6 m (8.5 ft). The specimens can be identified as not mature because they lack the fusion of the scapula and coracoid, and the lower hind limbs. Also, the pelvic region of the specimens are similar to Kentrosaurus juveniles. One 2009 study of Stegosaurus specimens of various sizes found that the plates and spikes had slower histological growth than the skeleton at least until the dinosaur reached its mature size.

A 2013 study concluded, based on the rapid deposition of highly vascularised fibrolamellar bone, that Kentrosaurus had a quicker growth rate than Stegosaurus, contradicting the general rule that larger dinosaurs grew faster than smaller ones.

A 2022 study by Wiemann and colleagues of various dinosaur genera including Stegosaurus suggests that it had an ectothermic (cold blooded) or gigantothermic metabolism, on par with that of modern reptiles. This was uncovered using the spectroscopy of lipoxidation signals, which are byproducts of oxidative phosphorylation and correlate with metabolic rates. They suggested that such metabolisms may have been common for ornithischian dinosaurs in general, with the group evolving towards ectothermy from an ancestor with an endothermic (warm blooded) metabolism.

=== Diet ===
Tooth crown illustration

Stegosaurus and related genera were herbivores. However, their teeth and jaws are very different from those of other herbivorous ornithischian dinosaurs, suggesting a different feeding strategy that is not yet well understood. The other ornithischians possessed teeth capable of grinding plant material and a jaw structure capable of movements in planes other than simply orthal (i.e. not only the fused up-down motion to which stegosaur jaws were likely limited). Unlike the sturdy jaws and grinding teeth common to its fellow ornithischians, Stegosaurus (and all stegosaurians) had small, peg-shaped teeth that have been observed with horizontal wear facets associated with tooth-food contact and their unusual jaws were probably capable of only orthal (up-down) movements. Their teeth were "not tightly pressed together in a block for efficient grinding", and no evidence in the fossil record of stegosaurians indicates use of gastroliths—the stone(s) some dinosaurs (and some present-day bird species) ingested—to aid the grinding process, so how exactly Stegosaurus obtained and processed the amount of plant material required to sustain its size remains "poorly understood".

The stegosaurians were widely distributed geographically in the late Jurassic. Palaeontologists believe it would have eaten plants such as mosses, ferns, horsetails, cycads, and conifers. One hypothesized feeding behavior strategy considers them to be low-level browsers, eating low-growing foliage of various nonflowering plants. This scenario has Stegosaurus foraging at most 1 m above the ground. Conversely, if Stegosaurus could have raised itself on two legs, as suggested by Bakker, then it could have browsed on vegetation quite high up, with adults being able to forage up to 6 m (20 ft) above the ground.

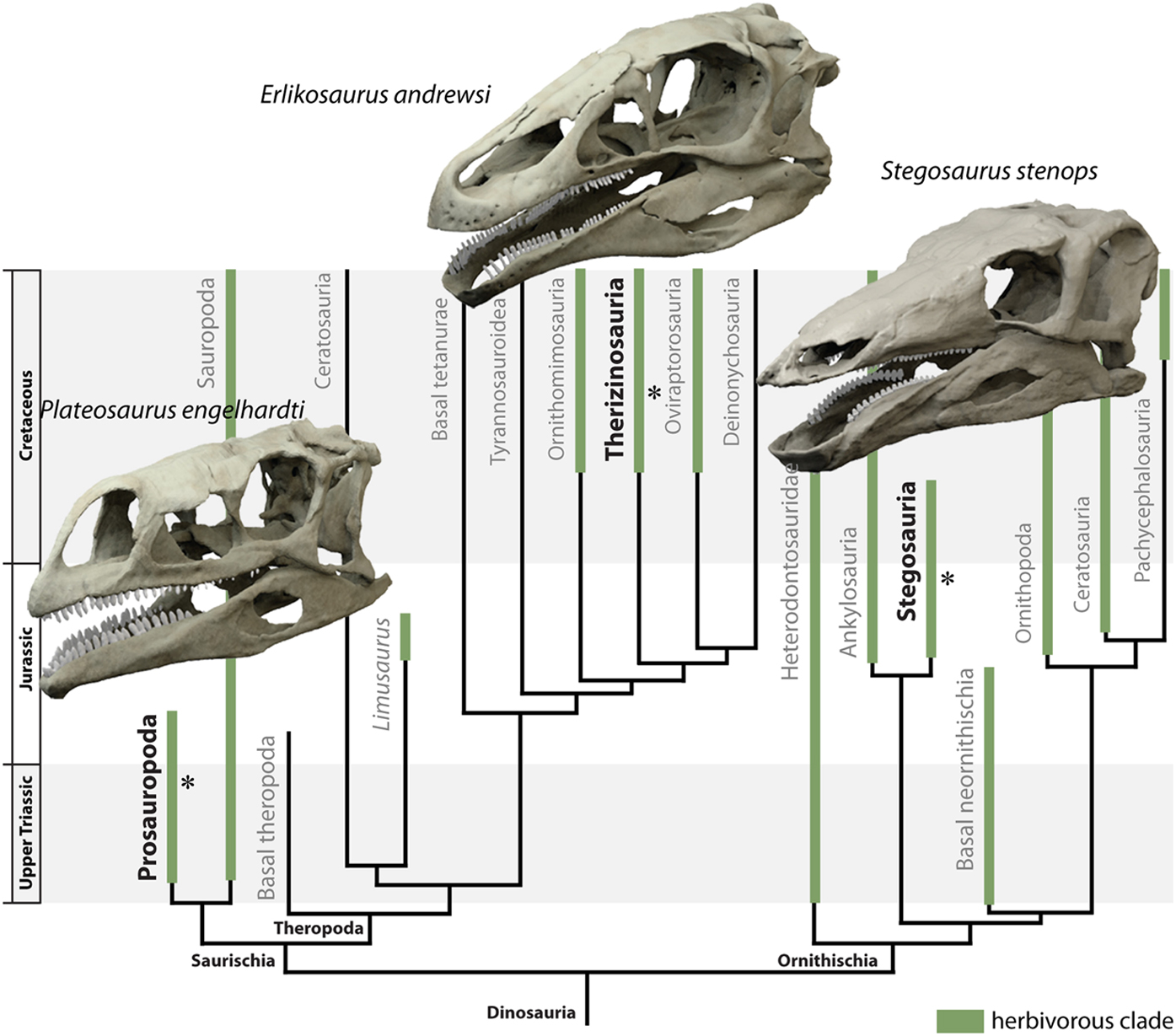
3D models of herbivorous dinosaurs, including S. stenops at right

A detailed computer analysis of the biomechanics of Stegosaurus's feeding behavior was performed in 2010, using two different three-dimensional models of Stegosaurus teeth given realistic physics and properties. Bite force was also calculated using these models and the known skull proportions of the animal, as well as simulated tree branches of different size and hardness. The resultant bite forces calculated for Stegosaurus were 140.1 newtons (N), 183.7 N, and 275 N (for anterior, middle and posterior teeth, respectively), which means its bite force was less than half that of a Labrador Retriever. Stegosaurus could have easily bitten through smaller green branches, but would have had difficulty with anything over 12 mm in diameter. Stegosaurus, therefore, probably browsed primarily among smaller twigs and foliage, and would have been unable to handle larger plant parts unless the animal was capable of biting much more efficiently than predicted in this study. However, a 2016 study indicates that Stegosaurus's bite strength was stronger than previously believed. Comparisons were made between it (represented by a specimen known as "Sophie" from the United Kingdom's Natural History Museum) and two other herbivorous dinosaurs; Erlikosaurus and Plateosaurus to determine if all three had similar bite forces and similar niches. Based on the results of the study, it was revealed that the subadult Stegosaurus specimen had a bite similar in strength to that of modern herbivorous mammals, in particular, cattle and sheep. Based on this data, it is likely Stegosaurus also ate woodier, tougher plants such as cycads, perhaps even acting as a means of spreading cycad seeds.

=== "Second brain" ===
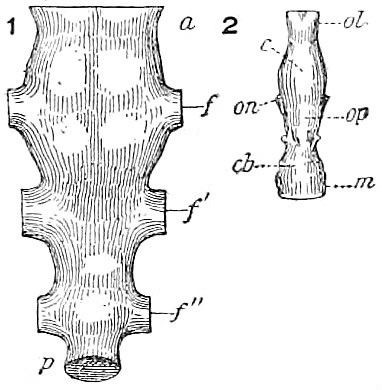
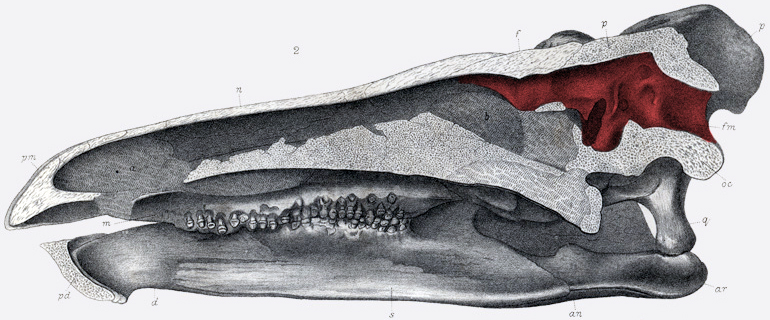
Casts of the sacro-lumbar cavity and brain cavity of S. ungulatus (left), and brain cavity marked with red (right)

At one time, stegosaurs were described as having a "second brain" in their hips. Soon after describing Stegosaurus, Marsh noted a large canal in the hip region of the spinal cord, which could have accommodated a structure up to 20 times larger than the famously small brain. This has led to the influential idea that dinosaurs like Stegosaurus had a "second brain" in the tail, which may have been responsible for controlling reflexes in the rear portion of the body. This "brain" was proposed to have given a Stegosaurus a temporary boost when it was under threat from predators.

This space, however, is more likely to have served other purposes. The sacro-lumbar expansion is not unique to stegosaurs, nor even ornithischians. It is also present in birds. In their case, it contains what is called the glycogen body, a structure whose function is not definitely known, but which is postulated to facilitate the supply of glycogen to the animal's nervous system. It also may function as a balance organ, or reservoir of compounds to support the nervous system.

== Paleoecology ==
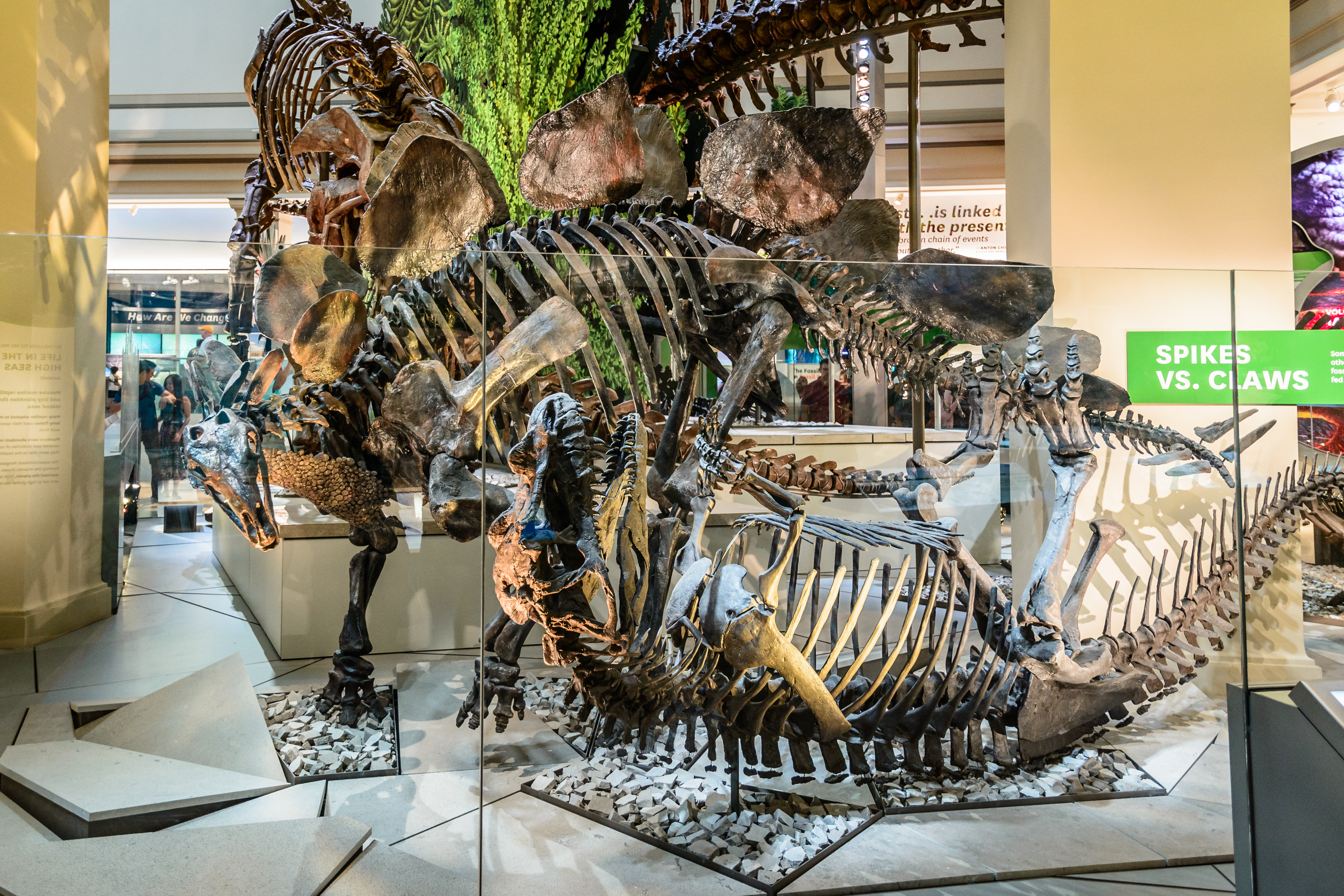
Mounted casts of Stegosaurus and Ceratosaurus skeletons posed in combat as "Spikes vs. Claws" in the Deep Time hall at the Smithsonian National Museum of Natural History

The Morrison Formation is interpreted as a semiarid environment with distinct wet and dry seasons, and flat floodplains. Vegetation varied from river-lining forests of conifers, tree ferns, and ferns (gallery forests), to fern savannas with occasional trees such as the Araucaria-like conifer Brachyphyllum. The flora of the period has been revealed by fossils of green algae, fungi, mosses, horsetails, ferns, cycads, ginkoes, and several families of conifers. Animal fossils discovered include bivalves, snails, ray-finned fishes, frogs, salamanders, turtles like Glyptops, sphenodonts, lizards, terrestrial and aquatic crocodylomorphs like Hoplosuchus, several species of pterosaurs such as Harpactognathus and Mesadactylus, numerous dinosaur species, and early mammals such as docodonts (like Docodon), multituberculates, symmetrodonts, and triconodonts.

Paleoenvironment and dinosaurs of the Morrison Formation, with S. ungulatus at middle right

Dinosaurs that lived alongside Stegosaurus included theropods Allosaurus, Saurophaganax, Torvosaurus, Ceratosaurus, Marshosaurus, Stokesosaurus, Ornitholestes, Coelurus and Tanycolagreus. Sauropods dominated the region, and included Brontosaurus, Brachiosaurus, Apatosaurus, Diplodocus, Camarasaurus, and Barosaurus. Other ornithischians included Camptosaurus, Gargoyleosaurus, Dryosaurus, and Nanosaurus. Stegosaurus is commonly found at the same sites as Allosaurus, Apatosaurus, Camarasaurus, and Diplodocus. Stegosaurus may have preferred drier settings than these other dinosaurs.

== Cultural significance ==
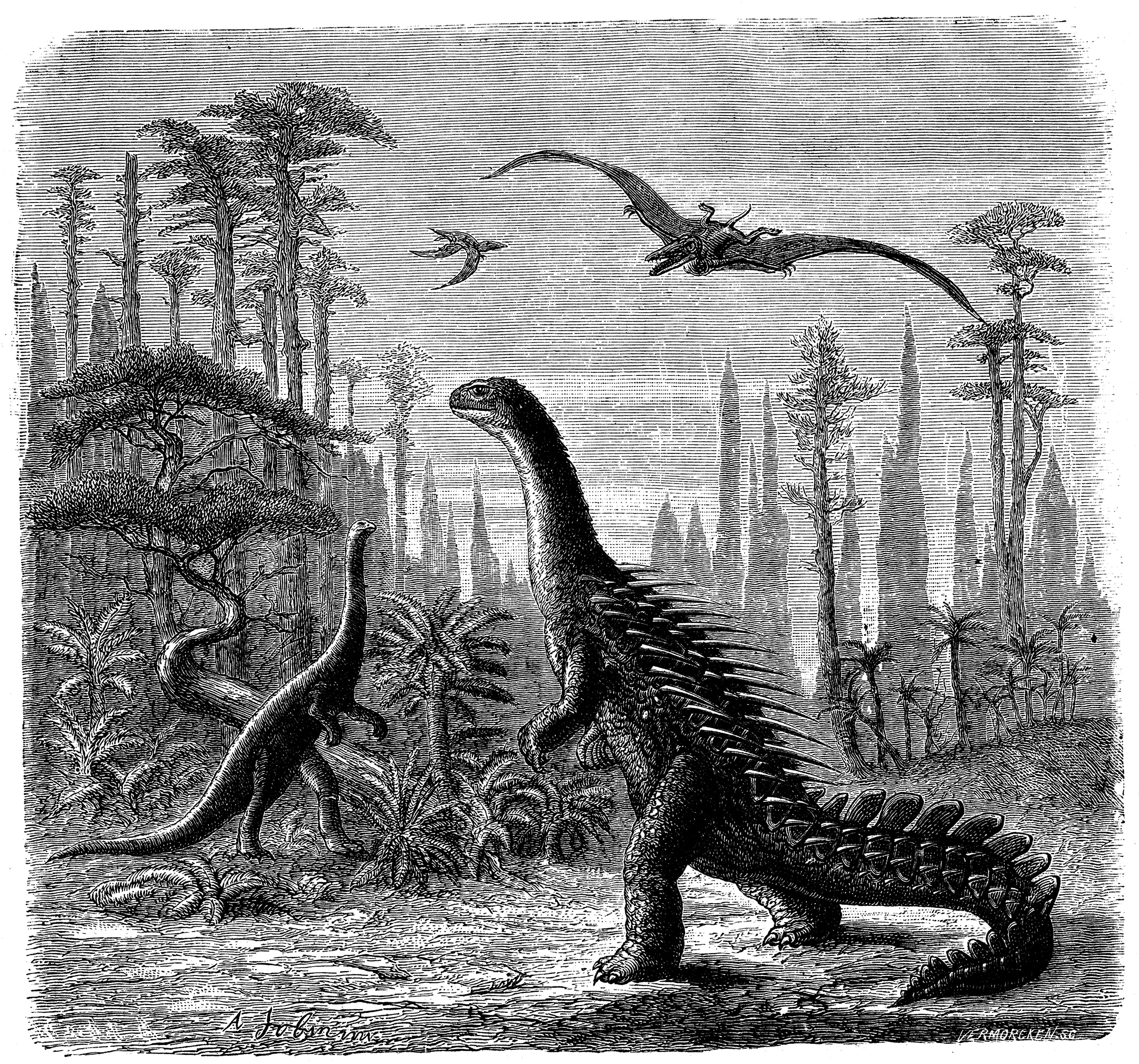
Early restoration of Stegosaurus by A. Jobin, 1884

One of the most recognizable of all dinosaurs, Stegosaurus has been depicted on film, in cartoons and comics and as children's toys. Due to the fragmentary nature of most early Stegosaurus fossil finds, it took many years before reasonably accurate restorations of this dinosaur could be produced. The earliest popular image of Stegosaurus was an engraving produced by the French science illustrator Auguste-Michel Jobin, which appeared in the November 1884 issue of Scientific American and elsewhere, and which depicted the dinosaur amid a speculative Morrison age Jurassic landscape. Jobin restored the Stegosaurus as bipedal and long-necked, with the plates arranged along the tail and the back covered in spikes. This covering of spikes might have been based on a misinterpretation of the teeth, which Marsh had noted were oddly shaped, cylindrical, and found scattered, such that he thought they might turn out to be small dermal spines.

Marsh published his more accurate skeletal reconstruction of Stegosaurus in 1891, and within a decade Stegosaurus had become among the most-illustrated types of dinosaur. Artist Charles R. Knight published his first illustration of Stegosaurus ungulatus based on Marsh's skeletal reconstruction in a November 1897 issue of The Century Magazine. This illustration would later go on to form the basis of the stop-motion puppet used in the 1933 film King Kong. Like Marsh's reconstruction, Knight's first restoration had a single row of large plates, though he next used a double row for his more well-known 1901 painting, produced under the direction of Frederic Lucas. Again under Lucas, Knight revised his version of Stegosaurus again two years later, producing a model with a staggered double row of plates. Knight would go on to paint a stegosaur with a staggered double plate row in 1927 for the Field Museum of Natural History, and was followed by Rudolph F. Zallinger, who painted Stegosaurus this way in his "Age of Reptiles" mural at the Peabody Museum in 1947.

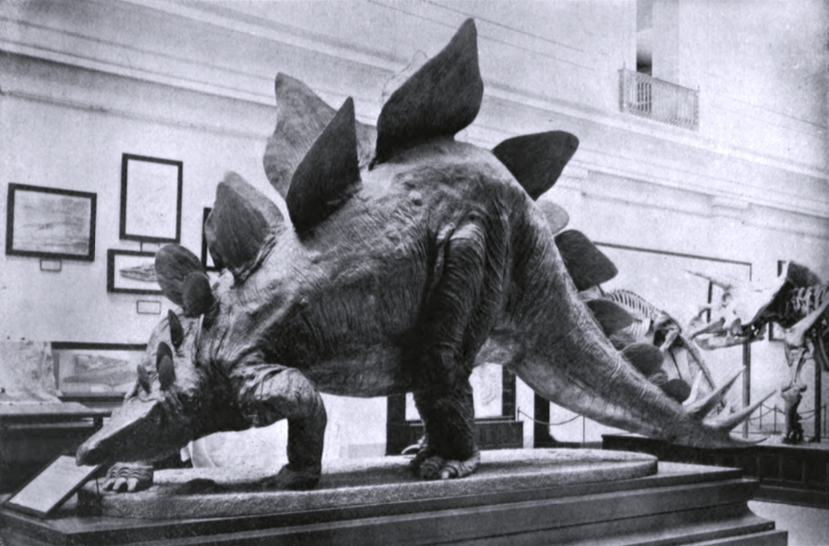
Life-sized restoration of Stegosaurus stenops in the U.S. National Museum, c. 1911

Stegosaurus made its major public debut as a paper mache model commissioned by the U.S. National Museum of Natural History for the 1904 Louisiana Purchase Exposition. The model was based on Knight's latest miniature with the double row of staggered plates, and was exhibited in the United States Government Building at the exposition in St. Louis before being relocated to Portland, Oregon, for the Lewis and Clark Centennial Exposition in 1905. The model was moved to the Smithsonian National Museum of Natural History (now the Arts and Industries Building) in Washington, D.C., along with other prehistory displays, and to the current National Museum of Natural History building in 1911. Following renovations to the museum in the 2010s, the model was moved once again for display at the Museum of the Earth in Ithaca, New York.

== See also ==
- Timeline of stegosaur research
