= Fruita Museum =

- U.S. National Register of Historic Places
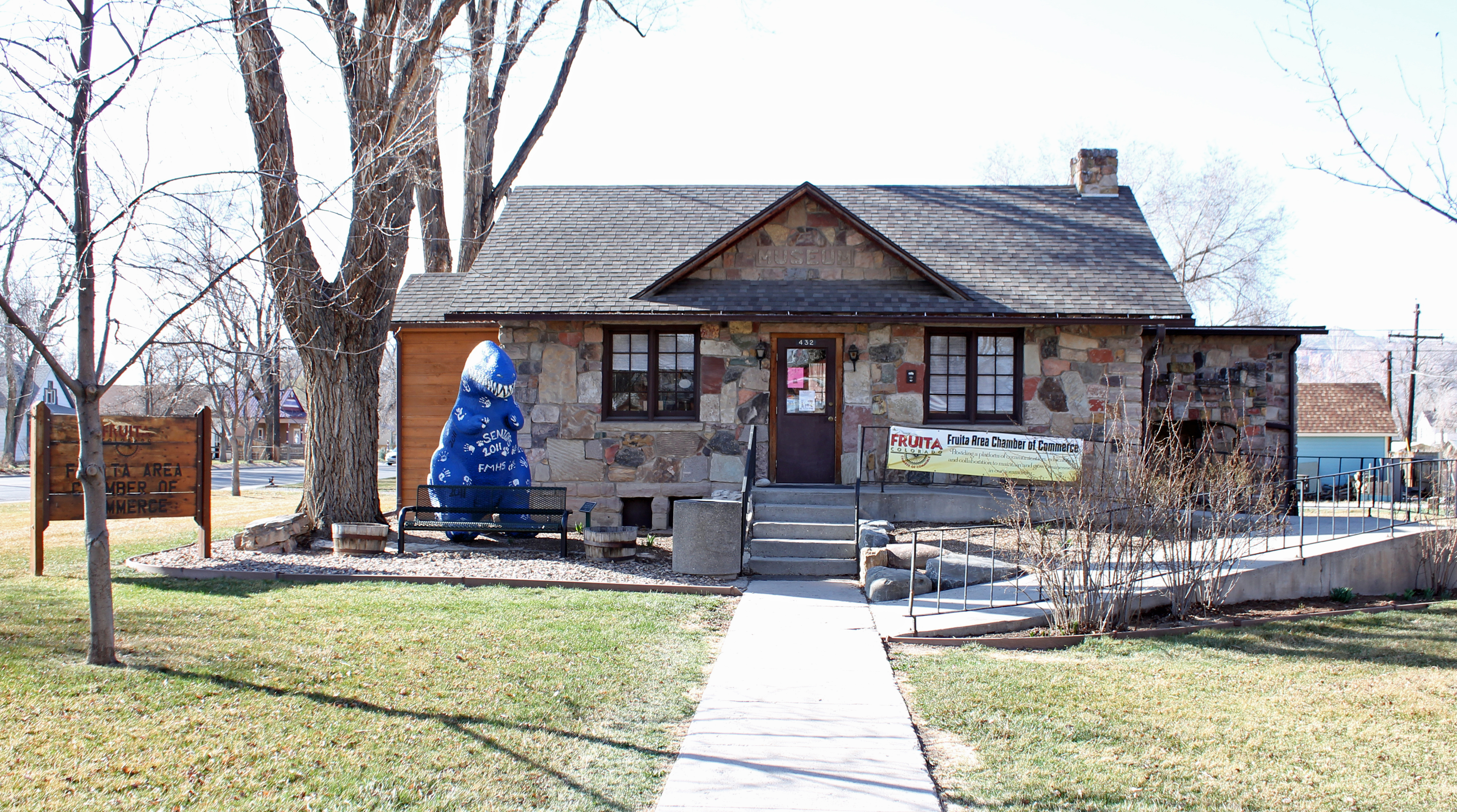
- Building in March 2013

- Location within Colorado
- Location: 432 E. Aspen, Fruita, Colorado
- Coordinates: 39°08′59″N 108°43′45″W
- Area: less than one acre
- Built: 1938-39
- Built by: Works Project Administration
- Architectural style: Rustic
- NRHP reference No.: 96001080
- Added to NRHP: October 10, 1996

The Fruita Museum, at 432 E. Aspen in Fruita, Colorado, is a Rustic-style building which was built in 1938-39 as a Works Progress Administration project to serve as a museum. It was listed on the National Register of Historic Places in 1996. In 2018, the building serves as home of the Fruita Area Chamber of Commerce and as a visitor center.

== Description ==
It is a one-story small building, with main room approximately 26 by 21 feet (7.9 m × 6.4 m) in plan, and with a 12 by 12 feet (3.7 m × 3.7 m) wing at its southwest corner. It was built slowly:

In an April, 1996 interview, Paul Peacock, a member of the crew that worked on the building, recalled the arrival of "rocks from south of the river and the Utah desert west of Fruita." Some people donated "favorite rocks that they had gathered up from trips." Peacock described some work days as including nothing but hunting for and hauling materials to the site. Some of the larger rocks had to be held in place until the cement started to set. The work was often slow and tedious, resulting in the nickname of the "Rock-a-Day Building."

It was used by the Fruita Times starting in 1945. It served as the Fruita Library from 1948 to 1996, becoming a branch of the Mesa County Library in 1952.

== See also ==
- Dinosaur Journey Museum, currently Fruita's most notable museum
