= Dinosaur Journey Museum =

- Location: 550 Jurassic Court, Fruita, Colorado
- Coordinates: 39.151530°N 108.739381°W

Dinosaur Journey Museum, or Museums of Western Colorado’s Dinosaur Journey, is a museum in Fruita in Mesa County, Colorado.

The museum offers an interactive and hands-on experience, showcasing over 15,000 fossil specimens. It features exhibits and displays highlighting regional discoveries, a visible paleontology lab where dinosaur bones are prepared for exhibition, a sandbox for creating your own dinosaur tracks, and a "quarry site" where children can excavate real Jurassic dinosaur bones.

== See also ==
- Fruita Museum, a predecessor museum building in Fruita, built in 1938-39 as a Works Progress Administration project, listed on the National Register of Historic Places
