= Spicomellus =

Spicomellus Temporal range: Middle Jurassic, Bathonian
- Skeletal reconstruction including the holotype (yellow) and referred (white) specimens

Scientific classification
- Kingdom: Animalia
- Phylum: Chordata
- Class: Reptilia
- Clade: Dinosauria
- Clade: †Ornithischia
- Clade: †Thyreophora
- Clade: †Ankylosauria
- Genus: †Spicomellus; Maidment et al., 2021
- Species: †S. afer

Binomial name
- †Spicomellus afer Maidment et al., 2021

Genus of ankylosaurian dinosaurs

Spicomellus is an extinct genus of unusual early ankylosaurian dinosaur from the El Mers III Formation (Bathonian age) of Morocco. The genus contains a single species, Spicomellus afer, representing the oldest named definitive ankylosaur. The species was initially described in 2021 based on a single rib with fused osteoderms, rendering its life appearance and relationships uncertain. In 2025, several additional bones, including osteoderms and cranial and postcranial remains, were described, revealing that it bears a unique array of spines over the body, including extremely elongated spikes around the neck and pelvis. It likely had a tail weapon, making it the oldest known ankylosaur with this structure.

== Discovery and naming ==
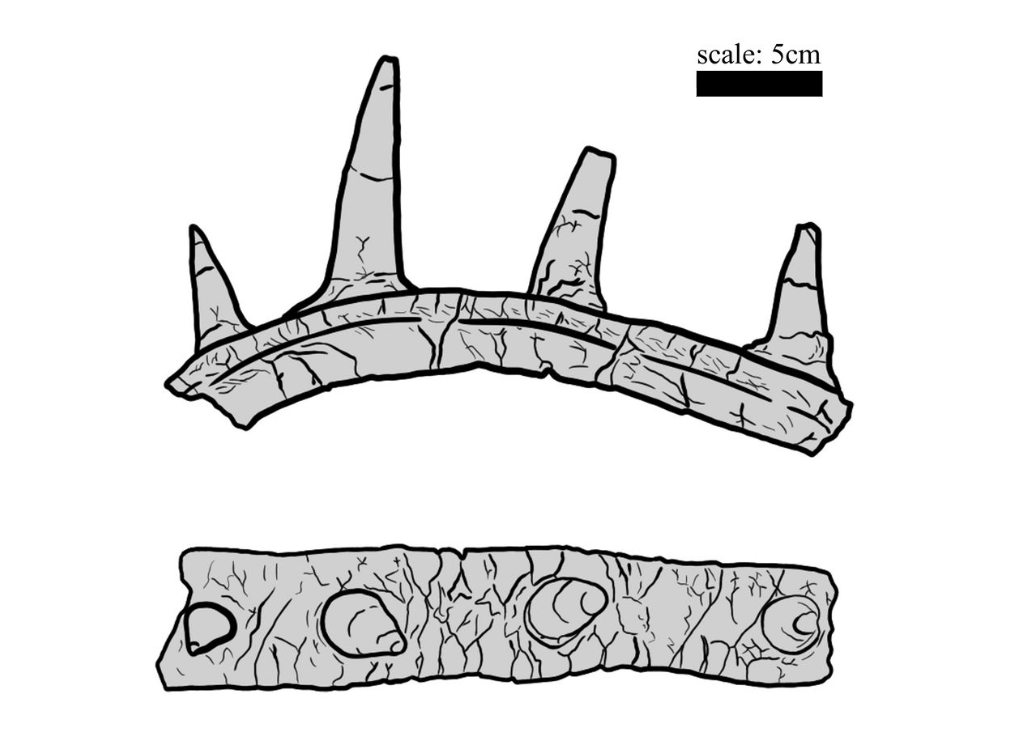
Illustration of the Spicomellus holotype

In 2019, the Natural History Museum in London acquired an unusual Moroccan fossil from a commercial fossil dealer in Cambridge. The specimen consists of a single dorsal rib fragment fused to a flat osteoderm bearing four spines on the external surface. After discussions with the English seller and the Moroccan fossil dealer from whom the specimen was obtained, English paleontologist Susannah Maidment and Moroccan geologist Driss Ouarhache were able to relocate the locality from which the specimen was collected. It originates from layers of the El Mers III Formation in the Middle Atlas mountains near the town of Boulemane in Fès-Meknès region, Morocco. Maidment and Ouarhache visited this location in 2019 and 2020, respectively, to examine its sedimentology and stratigraphy. The specimen was scanned using X-ray computed tomography (XCT) and histologically sectioned to confirm its authenticity and ankylosaurian nature.

In 2021, Maidment and colleagues described Spicomellus afer as a new genus and species of ankylosaurian dinosaurs based on this specimen, accessioned as NHMUK PV R 37412. The generic name, Spicomellus, combines the Latin words spica, meaning "spike", and mellum, which refers to a collar. The specific name, afer, is a Latin word referring to something inhabiting Africa.

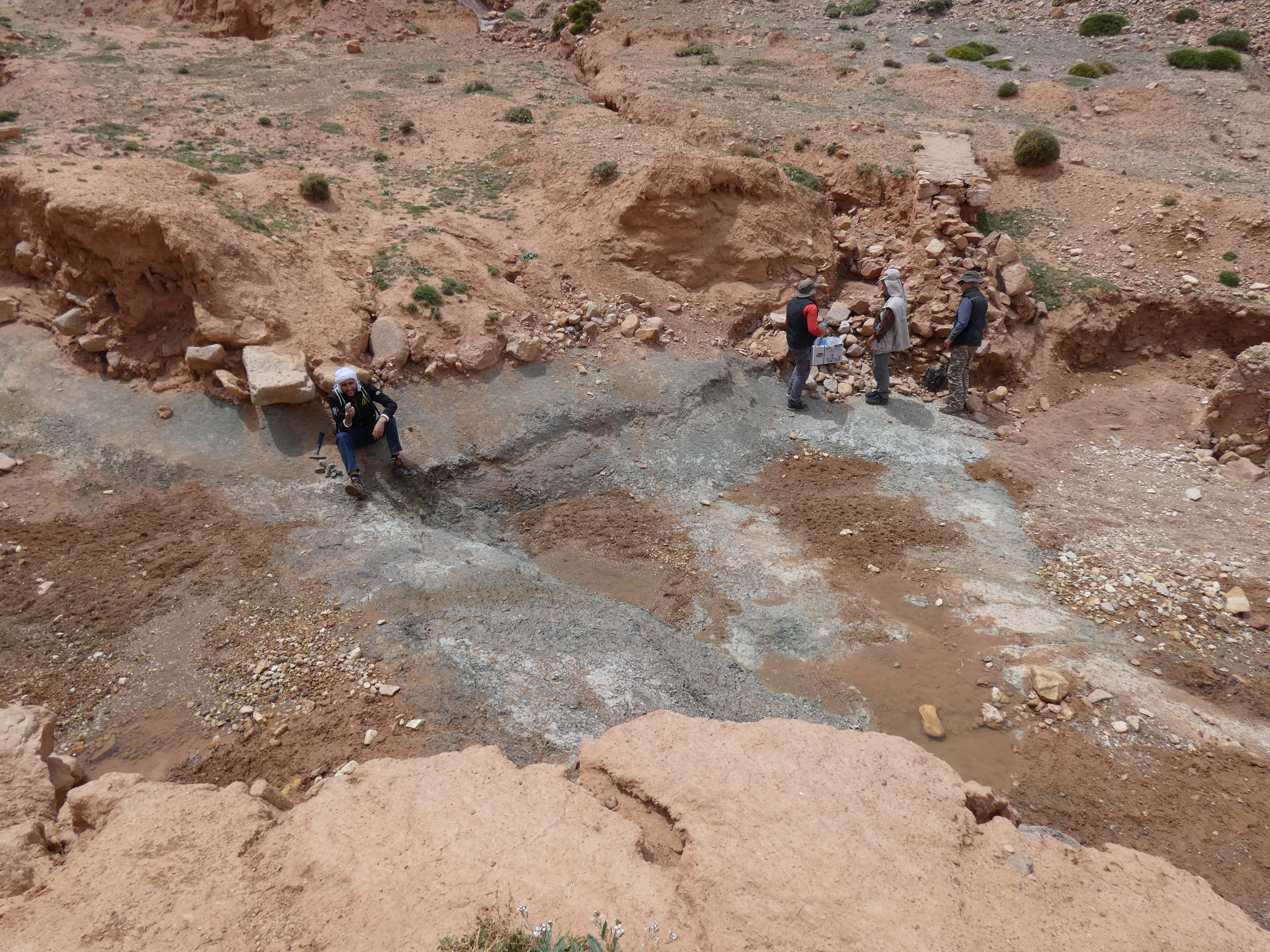
Exposed beds of the El Mers III Formation (type locality of the coeval Thyreosaurus)

In 2023, an expedition of paleontologists from England, America, and Morocco revisted the type locality in an attempt to locate additional material of Spicomellus. The team collected a partial skeleton including cranial bones (a left quadrate and other unidentified fragments), several vertebrae (two cervicals, two dorsals, four sacrals, four free (unfused) caudals, and two 'handle' caudals), six dorsal ribs, all of which bear the fused spikes seen in the holotype, both scapulocoracoids, a partial pelvic girdle (ilia and pubes and the right ischium), two metatarsals, an cervical half ring with very long spikes, and a sacral shield with both large and small spikes. Several plates, spikes of various shapes and sizes, and 'compound' osteoderms that combine small and large spikes fused to a base, were also found. In 2025, Maidment and colleagues described this second specimen, accessioned at Sidi Mohamed Ben Abdellah University as specimens USMBA 5–84.

Several Spicomellus bones have been illegally excavated and exported from Morocco, and then sold online. As such, efforts are being made to establish a protected area in the fossiliferous regions, as well as educate the local people, start a fossil preparation laboratory at Sidi Mohamed Ben Abdellah University, and train Moroccan paleontologists to lead excavations in the area.

Abundant diverse eurypodan dinosaurs have been found in Jurassic Laurasian sediments, but their remains are rarer in Gondwanan deposits. Spicomellus is the second described eurypodan taxon from North Africa, after the stegosaur Adratiklit, named in 2020. A second stegosaur, Thyreosaurus, was named in 2024.

== Description ==
Reconstructions illustrating the internal skeleton (top, blue) and osteoderm array (bottom, yellow) of Spicomellus

The preserved dermal spikes of the holotype rib are fused directly to the bone, a trait unique to Spicomellus and not known from any other vertebrate. Some prehistoric animals, including Protuberum (a cynodont) and Euscolosuchus (a pseudosuchian), have superficially similar modified ribs. In all other known ankylosaurs, the osteoderms are embedded into the muscle tissue, rather than fused to the underlying bone.

Fused 'handle vertebrae' with associated ossified tendons are known from the tail of Spicomellus, which likely indicate it had a tail weapon. Since the actual weapon has currently not been found, the morphology of this structure in Spicomellus is unclear. In later-diverging ankylosaurids, the weapon is club-like in shape, while in parankylosaurs such as Stegouros, it is frond-like. Regardless, it represents the oldest known occurrence of a tail weapon within the Ankylosauria. The abundant and extremely long spines, known from the neck and pelvic region, may have evolved for both defense and display. Smaller spikes were dispersed over the rest of the body, including some fused to a sacral shield over the hips. The cervical half-ring (bony 'collar' around the neck) bears two fused plates and five fused spikes radiating outward. The largest and most complete spike is 87 centimetres (34 in) long. While cervical half-rings are common in ankylosaurs, the morphology seen in Spicomellus is unique. Many partial osteoderms have been found, but their arrangement on the body is unknown.

== Classification ==
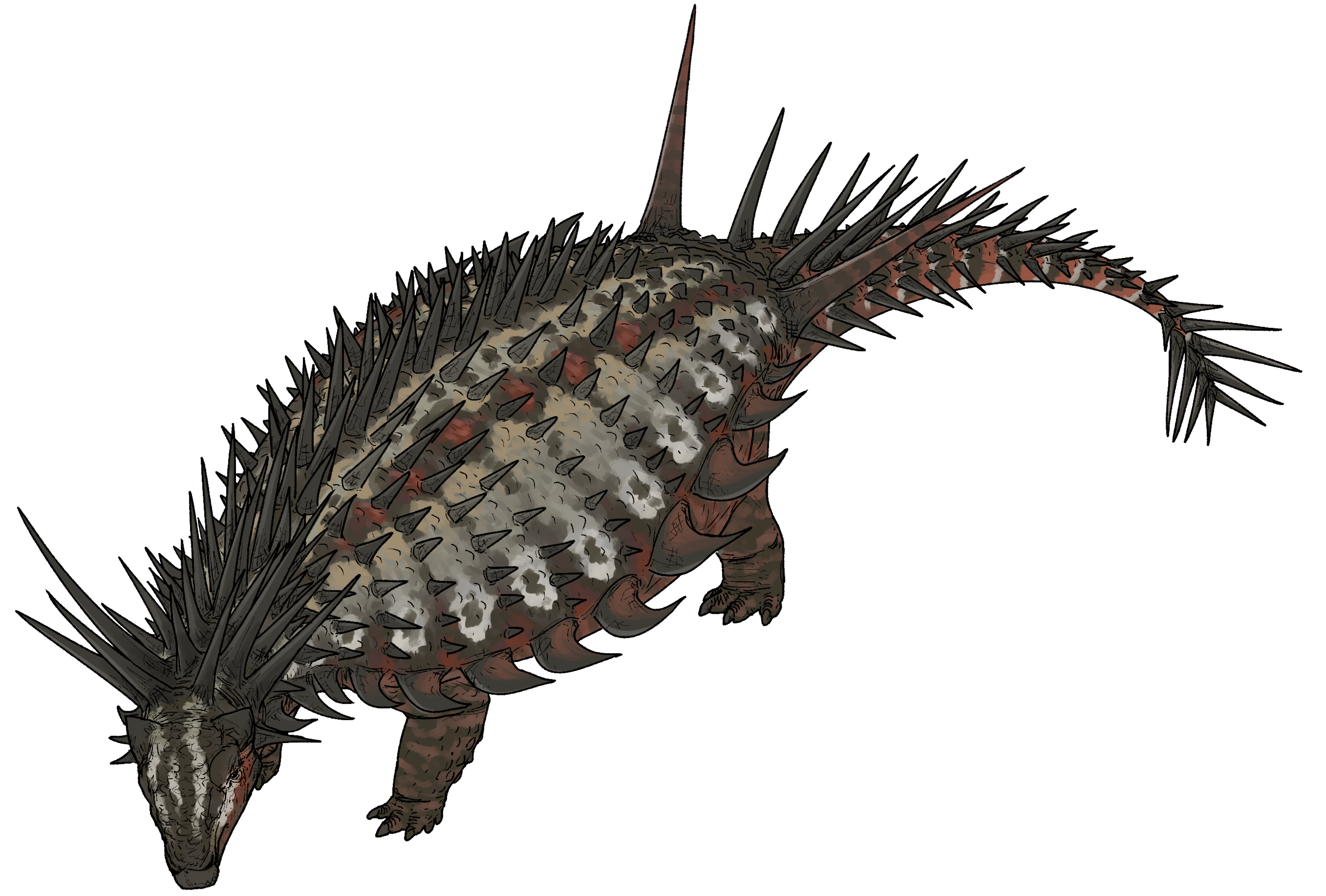
Speculative life restoration

Spicomellus is the oldest definitive ankylosaur currently named. Few other ankylosaurs are known from a similar time. Sarcolestes, known from a partial lower jaw, was found in England's Oxford Clay Formation, which dates to the younger Callovian age. An unnamed thyreophoran from the Bajocian-aged Bearreraig Sandstone Formation of the Isle of Skye, Scotland, could be older than Spicomellus, but it is unclear if these fragmentary remains belonged to a stegosaur or an ankylosaur.

Preliminary assessments of the holotype led researchers to consider stegosaurian relationships for the species. In their 2021 description of Spicomellus, Maidment et al. discussed several lines of evidence supporting the placement of Spicomellus as a basal ankylosaurian. They had considered the possibility that the rib was actually part of the jaw of an osteichthyan fish, since some members have teeth fused to their jaws. However, since there is no evidence of orthodentine—an important component of fish teeth—they considered this classification unsupported. Based on the T-shaped cross section of the rib, Spicomellus can reasonably be assigned to the Eurypoda (the clade including stegosaurs and ankylosaurs, all of which bear T-shaped ribs). Furthermore, the structural fibers of the osteoderms are interwoven, with a plywood-like arrangement, which is seen in ankylosaurs but not other thyreophorans.

Based on their description of additional remains in 2025, Maidment and colleagues tested the phylogenetic affinities of Spicomellus in the thyreophoran-focused dataset of Raven et al. (2023). In their strict reduced consensus tree (shown below in Topology A), they recovered Spicomellus in an early-diverging clade within the Ankylosauria outside of either the Ankylosauridae or Nodosauridae. This clade comprises an unresolved polytomy featuring—in addition to Spicomellus—Ahshislepelta, Chuanqilong, Gobisaurus, and Shamosaurus. Using extended implied weights (shown below in Topology B), they instead recovered Spicomellus in a basal position within the family Ankylosauridae, as the sister taxon to the clade formed by Gobisaurus and Shamosaurus. These contrasting results are displayed in the cladograms below, with equivalent taxa indicated in matching colors for clarity:

Topology A: strict consensus tree

- Ankylosauria
  - Stegouros
  - - - - Ahshislepelta
        - Chuanqilong
        - Spicomellus
        - Gobisaurus
        - Shamosaurus
      - Ankylosauridae
      - Nodosauridae

Topology B: extended implied weights

- - Polacanthidae
  - Ankylosauridae
    - Chuanqilong
    - - Jinyunpelta
      - - - Spicomellus
          - - Gobisaurus
            - Shamosaurus
        - - Borealopelta
          - later-diverging ankylosaurids ⇒

== Paleoecology ==
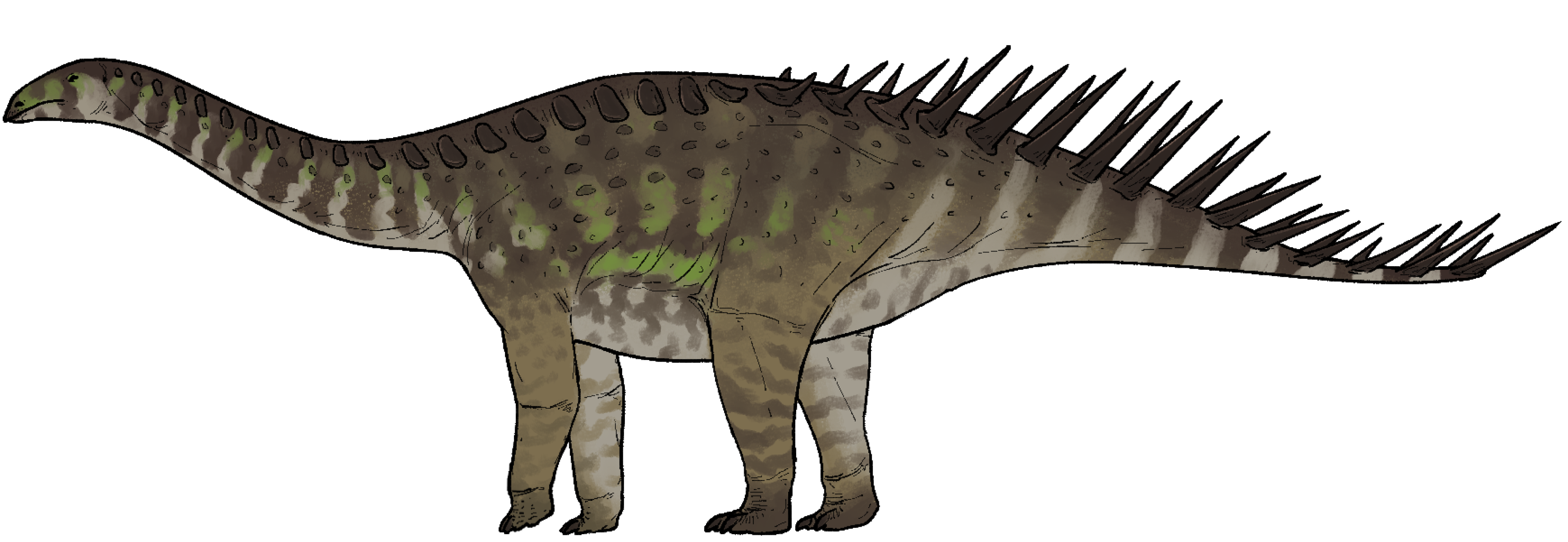
Speculative restoration of the unusual coeval stegosaur Thyreosaurus

Spicomellus is known from the El Mers III Formation (El Mers Group) of Morocco. This would have been part of the supercontinent Gondwana during the Middle Jurassic. The formation is currently represented by continental mixed clastic, evaporitic, and carbonate sediments. The sedimentology and stratigraphy of the locality suggest a shallow marine depositional environment. This setting was marked by episodic marine incursions, suggesting fluctuating sea levels.

The El Mers III formation has also yielded the remains of two stegosaurs, Adratiklit and Thyreosaurus. The presence of the ankylosaur Spicomellus in addition to these genera indicates that the two major thyreophoran groups (Ankylosauria and Stegosauria) coexisted for more than 20 million years. This implies that the putative extinction of the stegosaurs in the Early Cretaceous may have happened for reasons other than an increased diversity of ankylosaurs at that time. An unnamed turiasaur (known from teeth) and an unnamed neornithischian (known from a partial femur) are also known from this formation. Theropod dinosaurs and crocodylomorphs are known from the El Mers Group based on footprints.
