= Susannah Maidment =

English palaeontologist

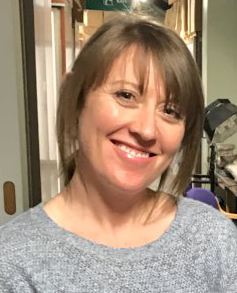
- Maidment in 2018
- Other name: Susie Maidment
- Education: Imperial College London; University of Cambridge
- Scientific career
- Workplaces: Natural History Museum, London; University of Birmingham

Susannah "Susie" Catherine Rose Maidment is a British palaeontologist at the Natural History Museum, London. She is also an honorary Professor at the University of Birmingham. She is internationally recognised for her research on ornithischian dinosaur evolution, and was awarded the 2016 Hodson Award of the Palaeontological Association and the 2017 Lyell Fund of the Geological Society of London. She was featured as a 2019 National Geographic Women of Impact.

== Education and career ==
Maidment studied geology at Imperial College London, graduating with an MSc in 2003. She completed her PhD at the University of Cambridge in 2007, in which she studied the systematics of the dinosaur group Stegosauria. Her research was supervised by David Norman and Paul Upchurch. Following time working as an exploration geologist in Vietnam, she moved in 2009 to work with Paul Barrett at the Natural History Museum, London, as a postdoctoral researcher co-investigator on a NERC-funded project on ornithischian dinosaur locomotion.

In 2012 she returned to Imperial College London as a Research Fellow, before moving in 2016 to the University of Brighton as a Senior Lecturer. In 2018 she re-joined the Natural History Museum, where she works as a senior researcher. She is an honorary Professor at the University of Birmingham.

== Research ==
Maidment has published more than 50 scientific papers, primarily focused on the systematics, evolution and palaeobiology of ornithischian dinosaurs. She has worked extensively on stegosaurs, and is considered the world leader on this group. Her contributions have included overall revisions of the systematics of the group, the description of the Portuguese stegosaur Miragaia, the description of the oldest known stegosaur, Adratiklit, from the Middle Jurassic of Morocco, the oldest known ankylosaurian Spicomellus, also from Morocco, anatomical and systematic revisions of Chinese stegosaurs, and work on the postcranial skeleton and body mass of Stegosaurus. She has also published several papers on locomotion and the evolution of quadrupedality in ornithischian dinosaurs.

In 2015, she was part of a team who reported evidence of original collagen fibres and blood cells in Cretaceous dinosaur specimens. Her most recent research has focused on the stratigraphy of the Morrison Formation of the Western United States. She was one of the lead scientists for the "Mission Jurassic" dinosaur excavation project that began in 2019.

In 2023, she was scientific advisor for the TV series Prehistoric Planet.
