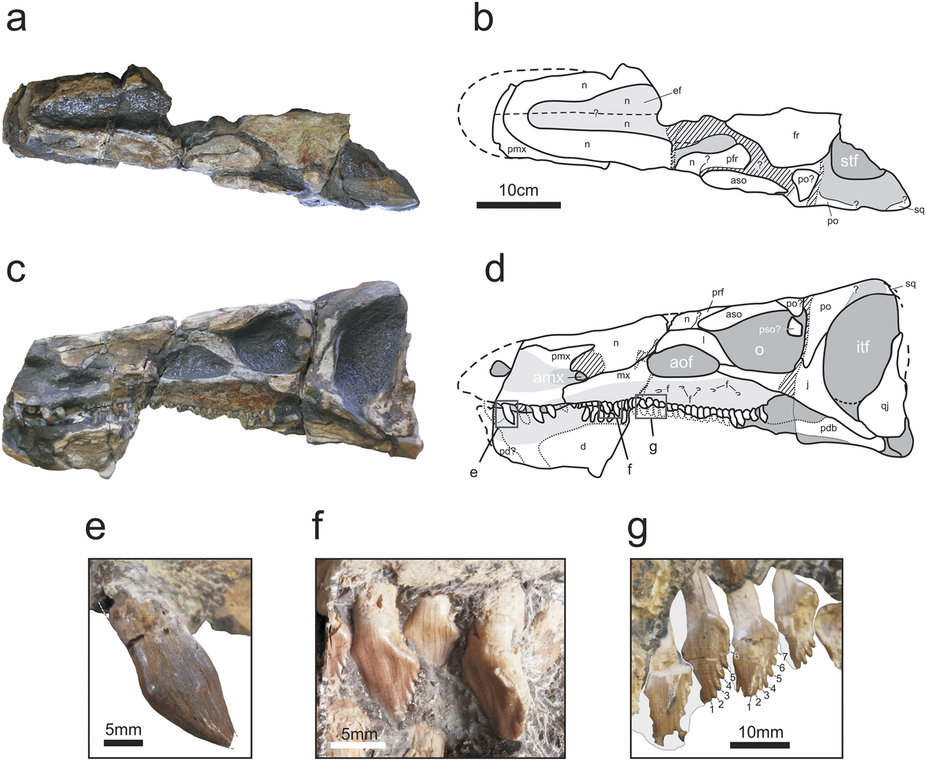
- Holotype skull and teeth

Scientific classification
- Kingdom: Animalia
- Phylum: Chordata
- Clade: Dinosauria
- Clade: †Ornithischia
- Clade: †Thyreophora
- Clade: †Stegosauria
- Family: †Huayangosauridae
- Genus: †Isaberrysaura; Salgado et al., 2017

Type species
- Isaberrysaura mollensis Salgado et al., 2017

= Isaberrysaura =

Isaberrysaura Temporal range: Bajocian ~168 Ma

Extinct genus of stegosaurian dinosaurs

Isaberrysaura is an extinct genus of stegosaurian ornithischian dinosaurs from the Middle Jurassic Los Molles Formation of Patagonia, Argentina. The genus contains a single species, I. mollensis, described by Salgado in 2017 based on a single specimen. Although initially classified as a basal neornithischian, subsequent analyses have allied it with the Stegosauria as the morphology of its skull resembles those of other members of the group.

== Discovery ==
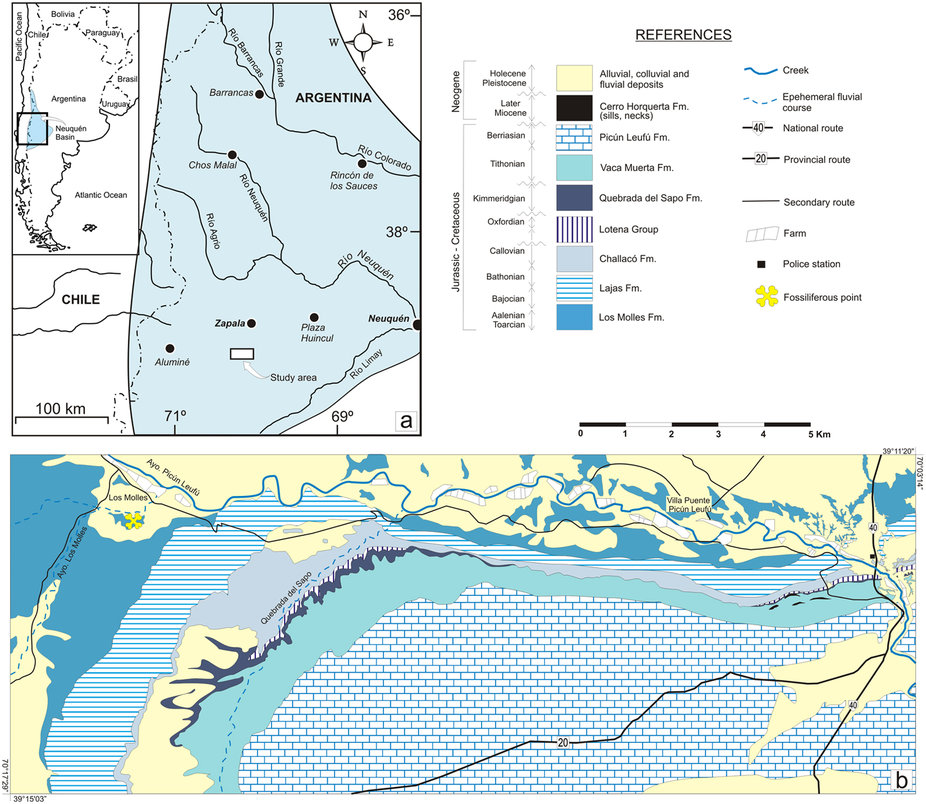
Map of the Isaberrysaura type locality

The Isaberrysaura holotype specimen, MOZ-Pv 6459, was discovered in the marine to deltaic sediments of the Los Molles Formation, which is of Bajocian age, by Isabel Valdivia Berry, who is honoured in the generic name. The specimen consists of a partial skeleton (the postcranial material of which is still unprepared) with a nearly complete skull, six cervical vertebrae, fifteen dorsal vertebrae, a sacrum with a partial ilium and apparently complete pubis, nine caudal vertebrae, part of a scapula, ribs, and other unidentifiable fragments.

== Description ==
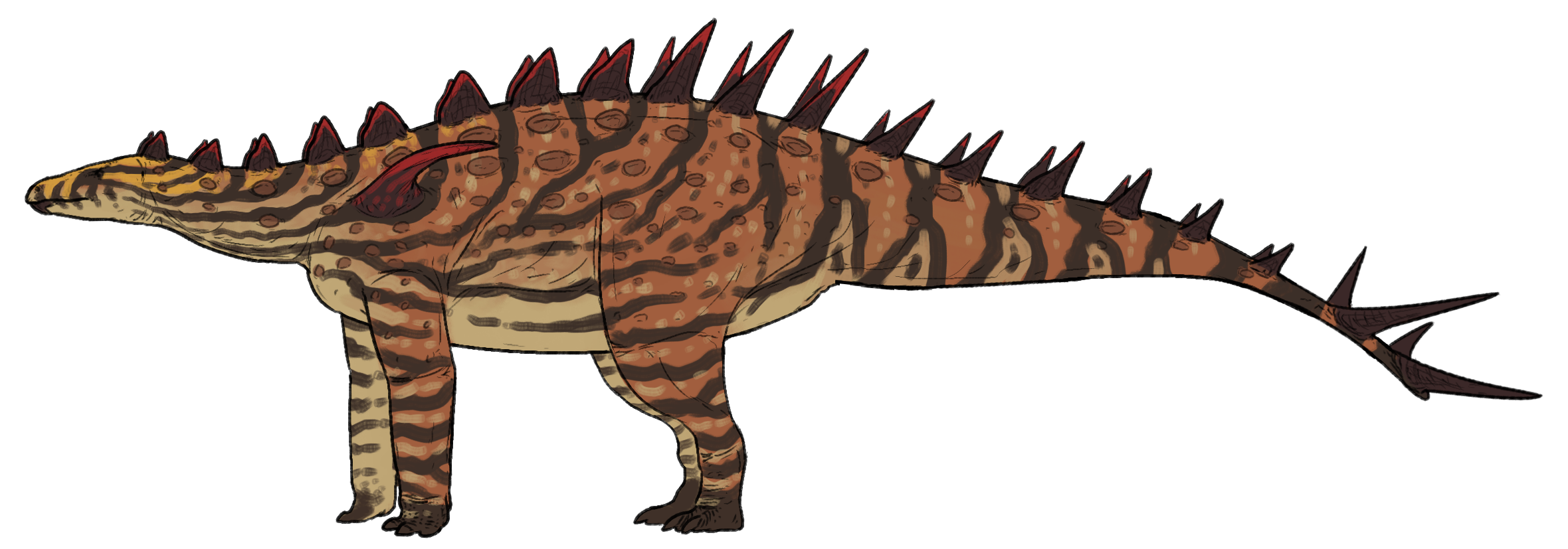
Speculative life restoration based on related stegosaurs

The teeth of Isaberrysaura are heterodont, with recurved premaxillary teeth and lanceolate maxillary and dentary teeth. In extant iguanid lizards, similar dentition is correlated with omnivorous diets, indicating that Isaberrysaura might too have been omnivorous. Isaberrysaura is also estimated to have measured around 5 to 6 m (16 to 20 ft) long, making it of moderate size.

The skull in particular is very unusual; it is estimated to be 52 cm long and 20 cm wide across the orbits, and it is almost as high as it is wide. The snout slopes anteroventrally from the posterodorsal corner of the infratemporal fenestra to what is seemingly the maxillary-premaxillary contact and the infratemporal fenestra is dorsoventrally deep. In contrast, the orbit is subcircular, not quite as dorsoventrally tall as anteroposteriorly long, smaller than the infratemporal fenestra, and only visible in lateral view. The anterolateral sector of the left supratemporal fenestra is relatively well preserved and it is visible only in dorsal view. The skull's antorbital fossa is roughly triangular, with its base longer than the other two sides. The jugal is triradiate and the anterior process of the jugal forms the posteroventral corner of the antorbital fossa and surpasses anteriorly the base of the lacrimal, a feature seen in basal thyreophorans and stegosaurs. The dorsal process of the jugal is proportionally long. The quadratojugal is very broad and the premaxilla is incompletely preserved while the post-cranial material is as-yet-undescribed at present. The dentition is heterodont, with six premaxillary teeth and thirty maxillary teeth.

== Classification ==
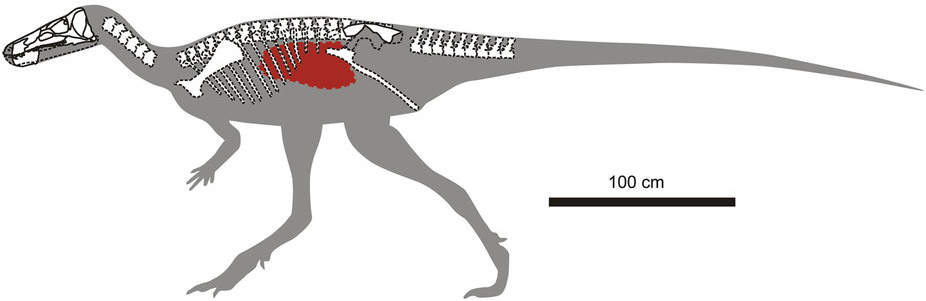
Initial reconstruction of Isaberrysaura as a neornithischian, which is now considered inaccurate, with gut contents in red

The classification of Isaberrysaura has been problematic, as the holotype specimen appears to share traits with both thyreophorans and neornithischians. For this reason, Salgado et al. (2017) recorded it as an early-diverging member of the Genasauria. Three datasets indicated that, while it possessed the characteristics of the neornithischians and thyreophorans, it did not fit within either of those groups, representing a previously unknown morphotype within the Ornithischia as a whole. However, several subsequent phylogenetic analyses have confidently recovered Isaberrysaura as a stegosaur. One such analysis, published in 2025 by Sánchez-Fenollosa & Cobos, recovered Isaberrysaura as the earliest-diverging member of an otherwise entirely Asian clade, the Huayangosauridae. These results are displayed in the cladogram below:

- Stegosauria
  - Huayangosauridae
    - Isaberrysaura
    - - - Bashanosaurus
        - Huayangosaurus
      - - Baiyinosaurus
        - Gigantspinosaurus
  - Stegosauridae
    - Chungkingosaurus
    - - - Tuojiangosaurus
        - Paranthodon
      - Neostegosauria
        - Dacentrurinae
          ⊞
          - Alcovasaurus
          - - Kentrosaurus
            - - Thyreosaurus
              - - Adratiklit
                - Dacentrurus
                  (including Miragaia)
          ⊟
        - Stegosaurinae
          ⊞
          - - - Qigu Formation stegosaur
              - Loricatosaurus
            - - Hesperosaurus
              - Stegosaurus stenops
          - - Jiangjunosaurus
            - - Hekou Group stegosaur
              - - Wuerhosaurus homheni
                - Yanbeilong
          ⊟

== Paleobiology ==
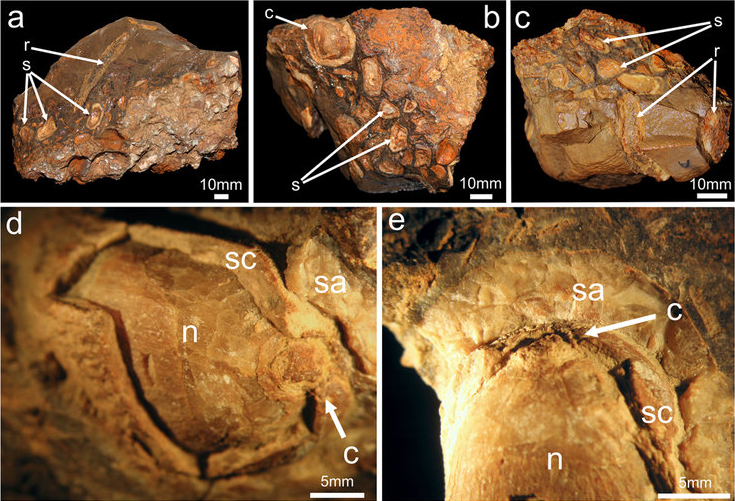
Gut contents preserved in the holotype

The holotype specimen of Isaberrysaura has been preserved with fossilized stomach contents. Within the rib cage, a mass of fossilized seeds was discovered; the first preserved meal uncovered in a basal ornithischian. Two types of seeds were recovered close to the posterior ribs of Isaberrysaura, distinguished according to their size. The largest seeds preserved three layers: an outer fleshy sarcotesta, the sclerotesta, and the inner layer (possibly corresponding to the nucellus). These seeds are cycadales of the family Zamiineae on the basis of a well-defined coronula in the micropylar region, whereas the smaller, platyspermic seeds are still indeterminate. The intact nature of the sarcotesta in the largest seeds suggests that Isaberrysaura swallowed the seeds whole without chewing and that they were in the first stages of digestion based on their position in the gut. Based on its teeth, it is possible that the dinosaur had an omnivorous diet, but as no trace of animal remains have been found alongside the seeds, this remains speculative at best. It also remains possible that there were enzyme-producing bacteria present in the dinosaur's gut to aid in digesting tougher plant material as seeds.

== See also ==
- 2017 in archosaur paleontology
