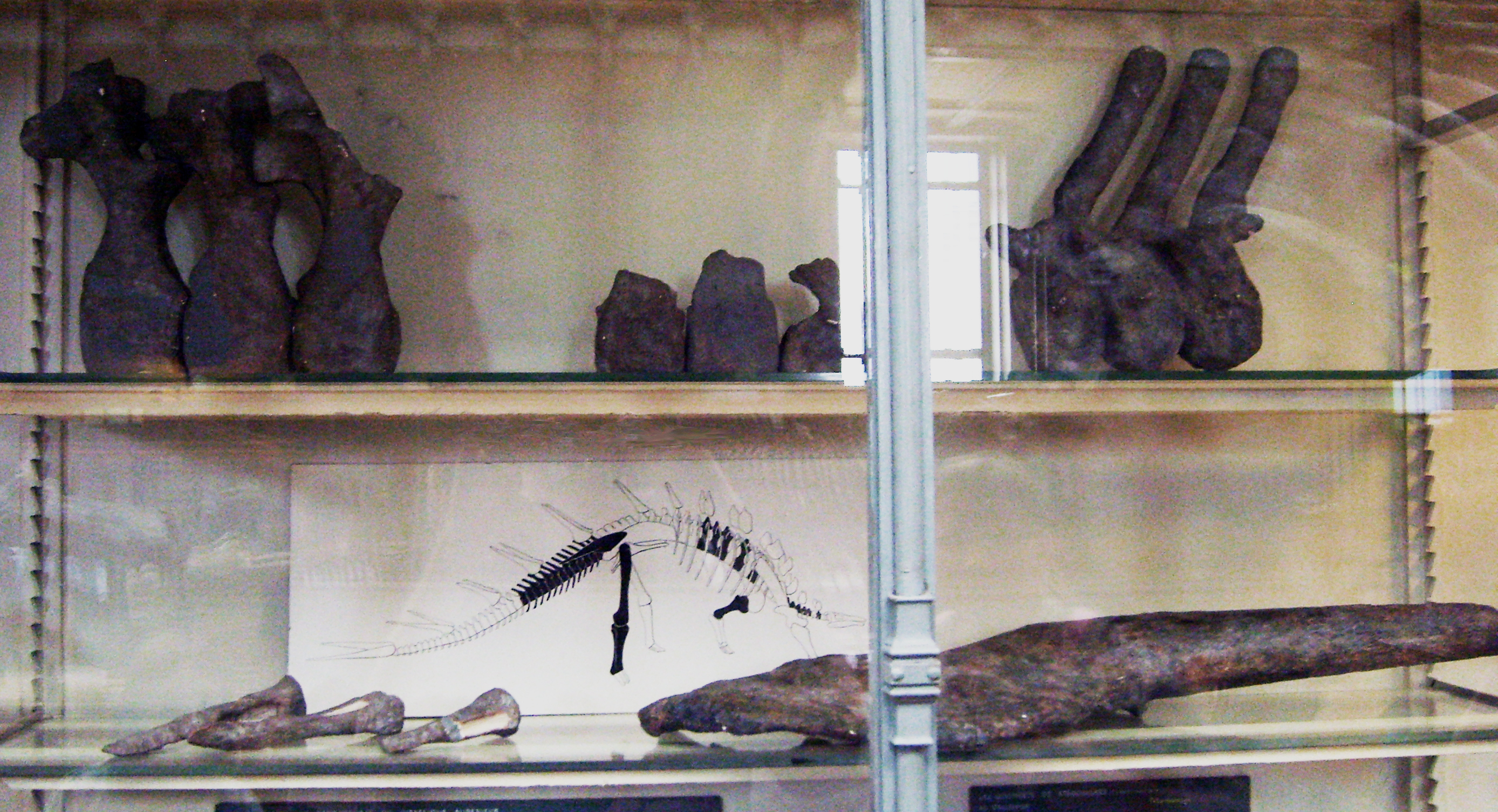
- Fossils originally referred to Lexovisaurus, Muséum national d'histoire naturelle, Paris.

Scientific classification
- Kingdom: Animalia
- Phylum: Chordata
- Class: Reptilia
- Clade: Dinosauria
- Clade: †Ornithischia
- Clade: †Thyreophora
- Clade: †Stegosauria
- Family: †Stegosauridae
- Subfamily: †Stegosaurinae
- Genus: †Loricatosaurus; Maidment et al., 2008

Type species
- †Loricatosaurus priscus Nopcsa, 1911

Synonyms
- Stegosaurus priscus (Nopcsa, 1911); Lexovisaurus priscus (Kuhn, 1964)

= Loricatosaurus =

Loricatosaurus Temporal range: Middle Jurassic, 164.7–161.2 Ma

Extinct genus of stegosaurian dinosaurs

Loricatosaurus (meaning "armored lizard") is a genus of stegosaurid dinosaur known from Callovian-aged (Middle Jurassic) rocks of England and France.

== Discovery and naming ==
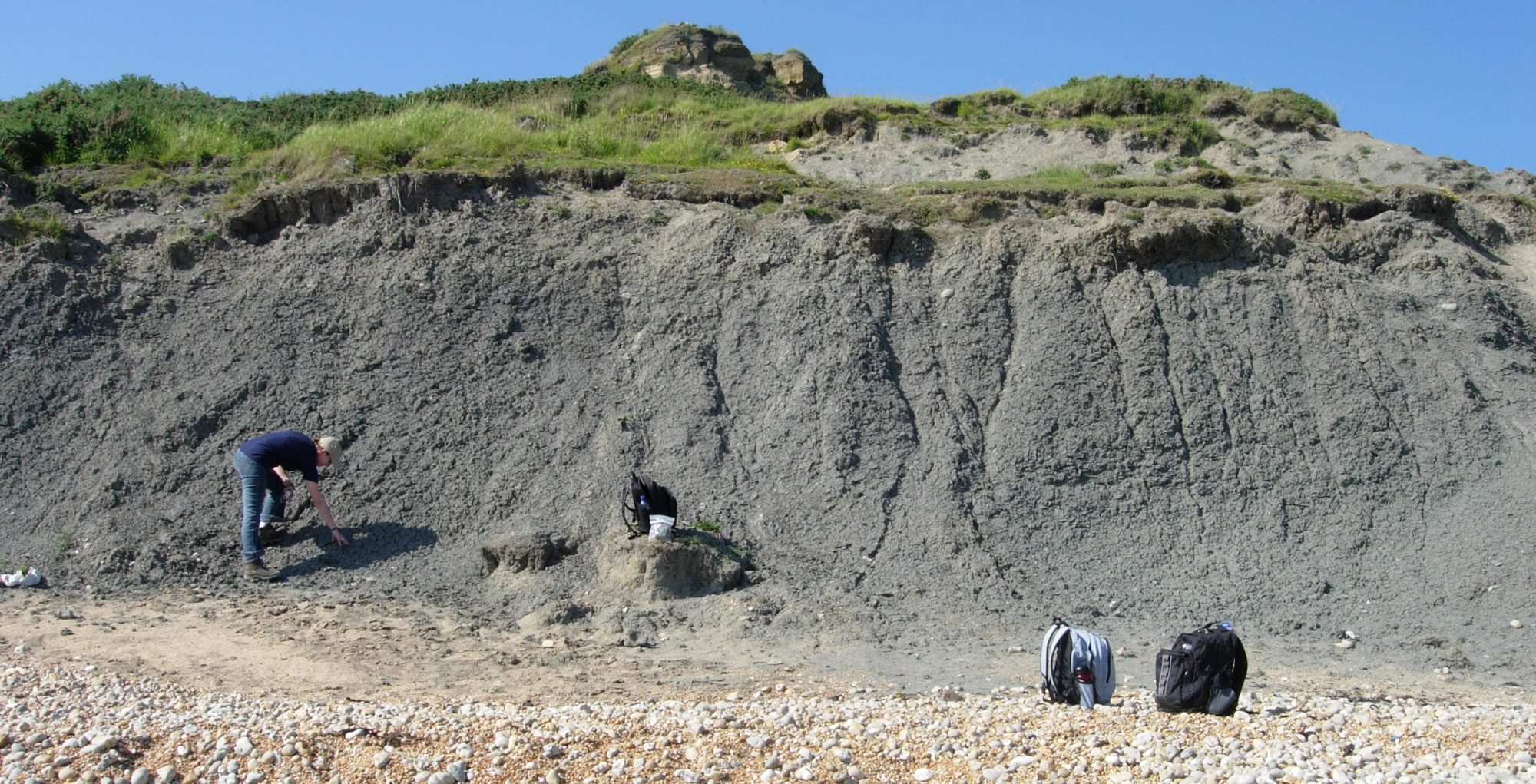
The Oxford Clay Formation where Loricatosaurus remains have been found

Loricatosaurus is known from remains previously assigned to Lexovisaurus that were first discovered at the Fletton brick pit in the Oxford Clay Formation, Fletton, Peterborough, England, by Alfred Leeds during November 1901. Leeds collected a semi articulated skeleton consisting of two cervical, six dorsal, and 16 caudal vertebrae, a partial right forelimb, partial left hindlimb, partial pelves, and some fragmentary dermal armor. One piece of armor was described as a parascapular spine, but it is actually a fragmentary tail spine.

In 1957, another specimen now referred to Loricatosaurus was briefly referred to Lexovisaurus until a more proper description was made in 1985 by Peter Galton. The specimen was a partial postcranial skeleton, including many vertebrae and a dorsal spine, from the Lower Callovian of Le Fresne d'Argences (Calvados), Normandy, France.

The material was later named Stegosaurus priscus (“ancient roofed lizard”) by Baron Franz Nopcsa in 1911 and Lexovisaurus by Hoffstetter, 1957 and Peter Galton, 1985. However, upon later review of the material in 2008, Susannah Maidment and colleagues determined that Lexovisaurus was based upon nondiagnostic remains, and coined a new genus for Lexovisaurus priscus and its referred specimen. The genus name Loricatosaurus derives from the Latin "loricatus" (meaning armoured) and the Greek "sauros" (meaning lizard).

It is known from only two partial skeletons. Contrary to previous reports (as Lexovisaurus), a shoulder spine is not present in the known material; the possible spine is more likely from the tail.

== Description ==
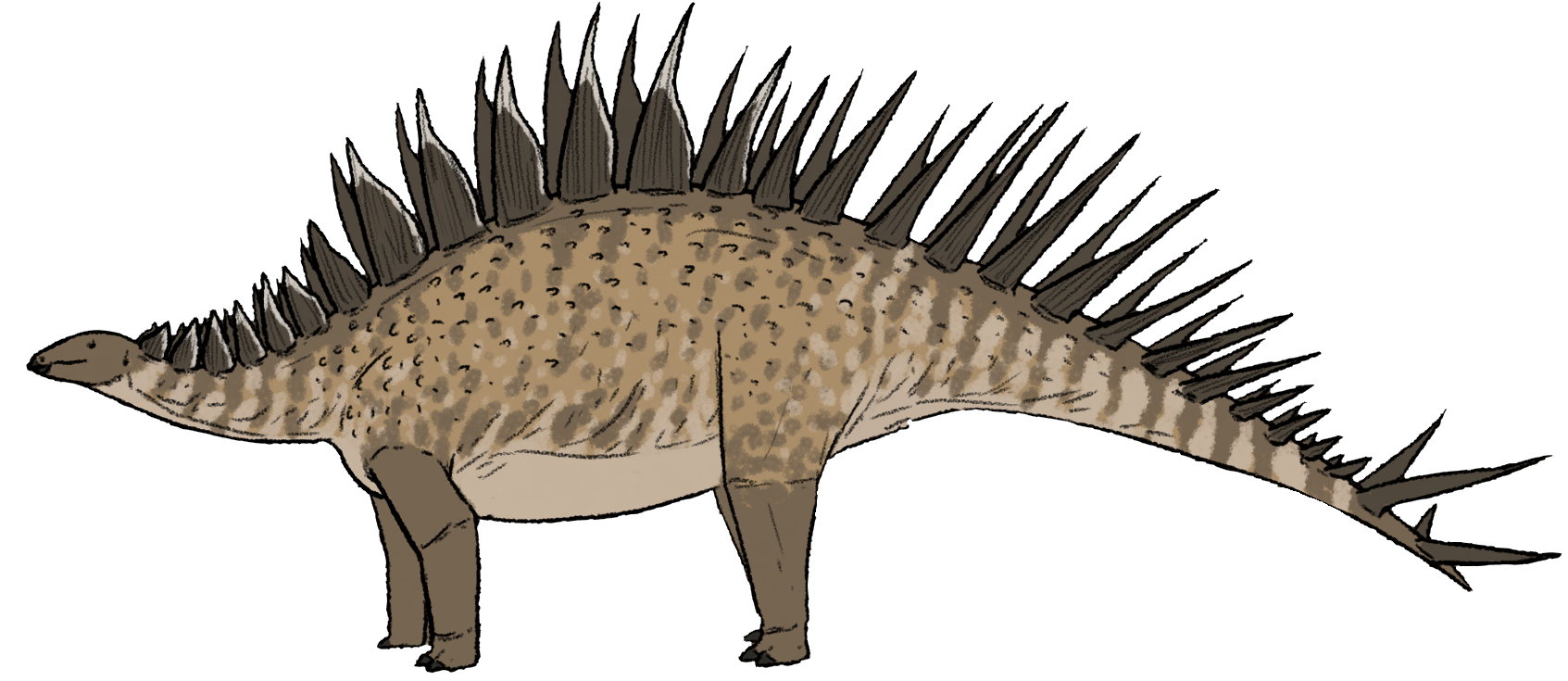
Speculative life restoration

The holotype (NHMUK R3167) is a partial skeleton, including two cervical, six dorsal, and 16 caudal vertebrae, a right humerus and right ulna, some carpus, two metacarpals (one incomplete), a partial ilia, partial right ischium, and pubis, the left femur, partial tibia and fibula, fused tarsals, and some armour plates. This material now resides in the British Museum of Natural History's palaeontology collection. Another referred specimen (MHBR 001), from an unnamed unit referred to as the Marnes a Belemnopsis latesulcatus Formation from the lower Callovian, Middle Jurassic of Le Fresne d’Argences, Calvados, Normandy, France, includes neck, back and tail vertebrae, a left upper arm, right thigh, shin and calf, and some armour plates.

== Classification ==
Multiple phylogenetic analyses carried out by S. Maidment and O. Mateus between 2008 and 2010 place Loricatosaurus as a basal genus within the family Stegosauridae.

A 2025 publication by Sánchez-Fenollosa & Cobos included Loricatosaurus in a phylogenetic analysis and recovered it as the sister taxon to an unnamed stegosaur from the Qigu Formation of China within the Stegosaurinae. These results are displayed in the cladogram below:

- Stegosauria
  - Huayangosauridae
    ⊞
    - Isaberrysaura
    - - - Bashanosaurus
        - Huayangosaurus
      - - Baiyinosaurus
        - Gigantspinosaurus
    ⊟
  - Stegosauridae
    - Chungkingosaurus
    - - - Tuojiangosaurus
        - Paranthodon
      - Neostegosauria
        - Dacentrurinae
          ⊞
          - Alcovasaurus
          - - Kentrosaurus
            - - Thyreosaurus
              - - Adratiklit
                - Dacentrurus
                  (including Miragaia)
          ⊟
        - Stegosaurinae
          - - - Qigu Formation stegosaur
              - Loricatosaurus
            - - Hesperosaurus
              - Stegosaurus stenops
          - - Jiangjunosaurus
            - - Hekou Group stegosaur
              - - Wuerhosaurus homheni
                - Yanbeilong

== See also ==
- Timeline of stegosaur research
