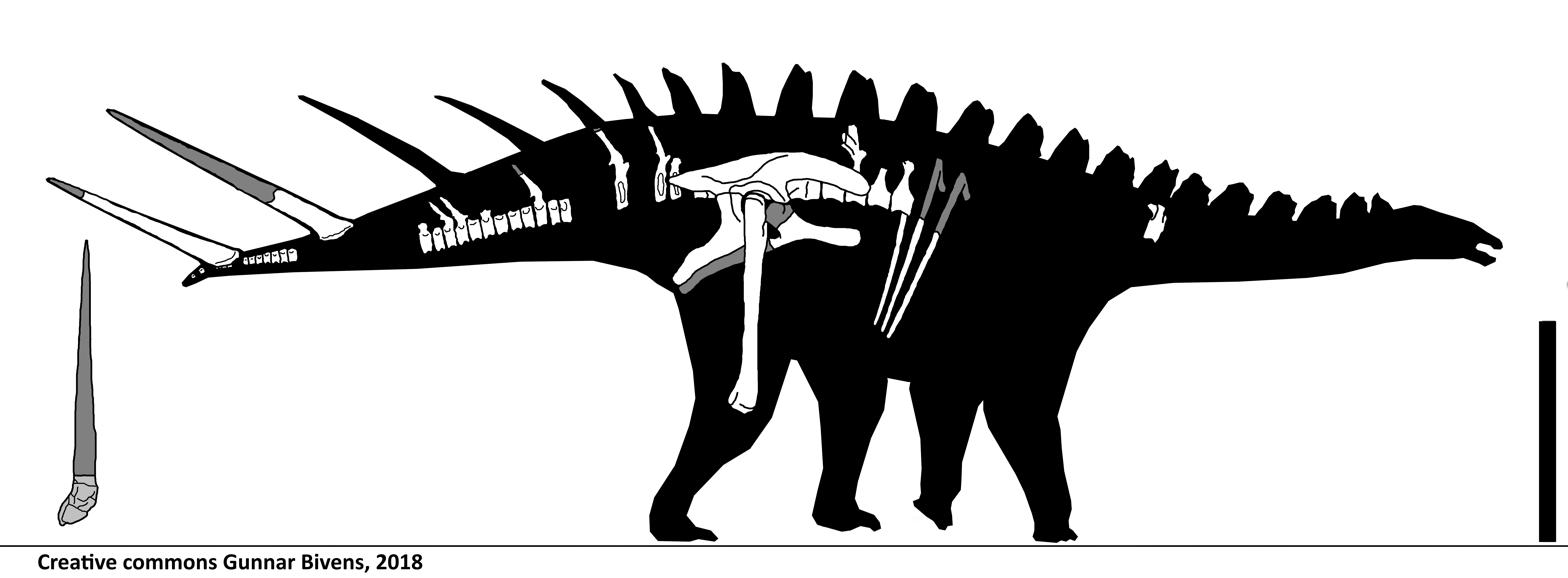
- Skeletal reconstruction with known material in white

Scientific classification
- Kingdom: Animalia
- Phylum: Chordata
- Class: Reptilia
- Clade: Dinosauria
- Clade: †Ornithischia
- Clade: †Thyreophora
- Clade: †Stegosauria
- Family: †Stegosauridae
- Subfamily: †Dacentrurinae
- Genus: †Alcovasaurus; Galton & Carpenter, 2016
- Species: †A. longispinus

Binomial name
- †Alcovasaurus longispinus (Gilmore, 1914)

Synonyms
- Kentrosaurus longispinus (Gilmore, 1914) Olshevsky & Lee Ford, 1993; Miragaia longispinus (Gilmore, 1914) Costa & Mateus, 2019; Stegosaurus longispinus Gilmore, 1914 (type)

= Alcovasaurus =

Alcovasaurus Temporal range: Late Jurassic, 150 Ma

Extinct genus of dinosaurs

Alcovasaurus is an extinct genus of herbivorous stegosaurian dinosaurs that lived in the Late Jurassic. It was found in the Morrison Formation of Wyoming, United States. The genus contains a single species, Alcovasaurus longispinus, originally assigned to the genus Stegosaurus. It is likely a member of the Dacentrurinae, and has been referred to the genus Miragaia by some authors.

== Discovery and naming ==
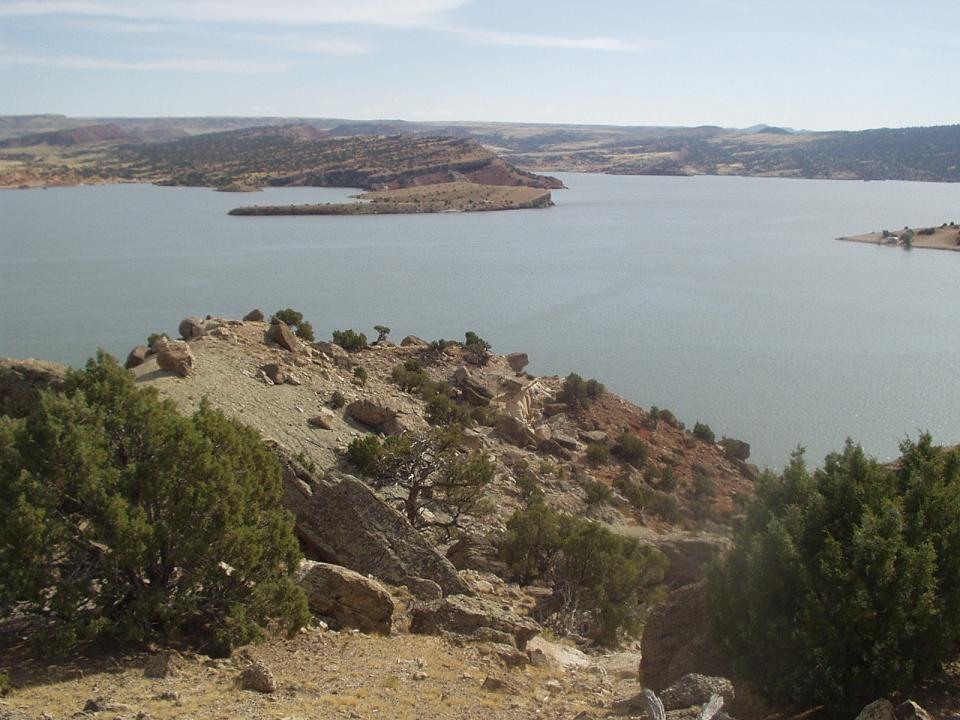
The geography of Alcova, Wyoming, where the remains of Alcovasaurus were discovered

In July 1908, Professors William Harlow Reed and A.C. Dart of the University of Wyoming, in the Alcova Quarry in Natrona County, Wyoming, uncovered the skeleton of a stegosaurian. This would be the last major excavation of a dinosaur in which Reed was personally involved. In 1914, the find was named and described as Stegosaurus longispinus by Charles Whitney Gilmore on the basis of holotype UW 20503 (originally UW D54), a partial postcranial skeleton of an adult individual consisting of forty-two vertebrae, a fragmentary sacrum, two ischia, a portion of one pubis, the right femur, several ribs and four dermal tail spines. The specific name is derived from Latin longus, "long", and spina, "spine", in reference to the long tail spines. Due to the presence of very long tail spines, S. longispinus was treated as valid by subsequent authors. In 1993, S. longispinus was by George Olshevsky and Tracy Lee Ford seen as a possible North American species of the African genus Kentrosaurus as a Kentrosaurus longispinus.

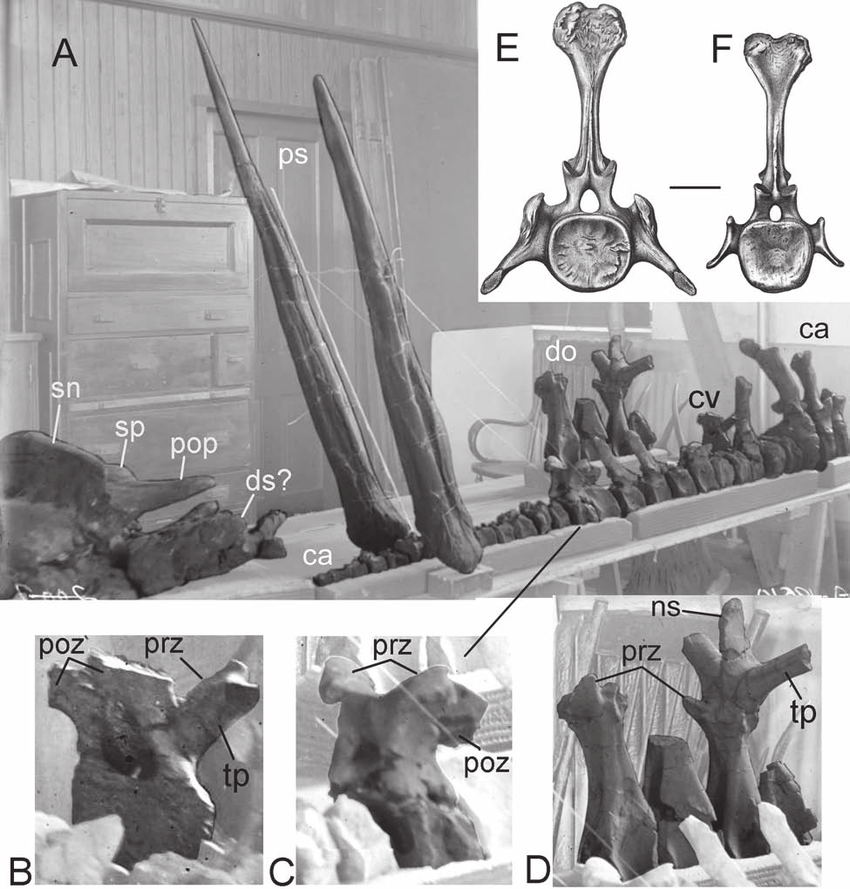
Alcovasaurus holotype on display at the University of Wyoming's museum, 1914–late 1920s

Unfortunately, the type specimen of this species was damaged in the late 1920s when the water pipes of the University of Wyoming's museum burst. For this reason, the whereabouts of the type specimen were mistakenly considered to be lost, although a femur catalogued as part of UW 20503 is still extant, as the last-surviving part of the type specimen. Plaster casts had been made of the rear tail spikes. Also photographic evidence of the skeleton being excavated is still available, showing the bones in situ, as well as of the skeletal museum mount.

Although the validity of Stegosaurus longispinus was disputed because the long dermal spines were likely to be a product of ontogeny or sexual dimorphism, the amateur freelance paleontologist Roman Ulansky decided that the long tail spines were sufficient to remove S. longispinus from Stegosaurus and place it in a new genus, "Natronasaurus". Ulansky interpreted "Natronasaurus" as a close relative of Kentrosaurus in accordance with the hypothesis of Olshevsky and Ford (1993). Ulansky published the name in a self-published electronic publication that was not archived by an independent organization nor had an ISSN. This renders the name "Natronasaurus" invalid, and Peter Malcolm Galton and Kenneth Carpenter gave the genus another name, Alcovasaurus, in 2016, as part of a revision of the species. The new genus name is a reference to Alcova, Wyoming. Galton and Carpenter also referred a very large round spike base to the species, found by Cliff Miles in Wyoming in the 1990s. Its present location is unknown but a cast was made with inventory number DMNH 33431.

In 2019, Francisco Costa and Octávio Mateus judged that Alcovasaurus was not sufficiently distinct from the genus Miragaia, and renamed it Miragaia longispinus. This was based on a description of a new specimen, MG 4863, of Miragaia longicollum preserving the first relatively complete tail known from a dacentrurine stegosaur. It was concluded that almost all of the diagnostic characters that were found to distinguish Alcovasaurus from other stegosaurs also occurred in MG 4863. Costa and Mateus considered the two species to be congeneric, with the name Miragaia having priority. However, Sánchez-Fenollosa et al. (2024) supported the synonymy of Miragaia and Dacentrurus based on a new specimen of the latter from the Villar del Arzobispo Formation, and suggested that Alcovasaurus is a separate genus. In their re-description of the specimen MG 4863, Costa et al. (2025) argued that the two taxa are not synonymous based on comparison with the Dacentrurus holotype and that Alcovasaurus should be included as a second species of Miragaia.

== Description ==
Size of Alcovasaurus compared to a human

Alcovasaurus was a large stegosaur, reaching 6.5 metres (21 ft) in length and 3.5 metric tons (3.9 short tons) in body mass. Some large individuals may have reached 5 metric tons (5.5 short tons) in body mass. The thighbone length was by Gilmore determined at 108.2 cm (42.6 in). The longest spike was 86 cm (34 in) long. Its point was broken and Gilmore estimated the original length of the bone core at 98.5 cm (38.8 in).

Gilmore first diagnosed S. longispinus from other Stegosaurus species by the presence of very long dermal spikes, distal caudal vertebral centra rounded in anterior/posterior view, vestigial transverse processes on distal caudal vertebrae, and centra with mushroom-shaped dorsal extensions. In 2016, Galton and Carpenter indicated five autapomorphies, unique derived traits. Side processes are present in the distal, rear, and tail vertebrae. The distal tail vertebrae are short, and taller than long. Two tail spike pairs are very slender and elongated, with 90% of the thighbone length. The last spike pair has their greatest width at a quarter of the shaft length, measured from below. The lower joint surface of the condyles of the thighbone is limited to the underside.

As a further possible autapomorphy, Alcovasaurus is different from the Jurassic North American stegosaurians Stegosaurus stenops, Stegosaurus sulcatus and Hesperosaurus in that its sacrum is connected to the ilia by six pairs of sacral ribs instead of four. Other stegosaurians show at most five. Gilmore also claimed that Alcovasaurus was distinctive in having a rear spike pair equaling the front pair in size. Galton & Carpenter found this trait difficult to confirm from the extant photographic evidence, but it would make Alcovasaurus differ from all known stegosaurians with four spikes, which always show a shorter rear pair. Also the two pairs would be positioned exceptionally far apart from each other.

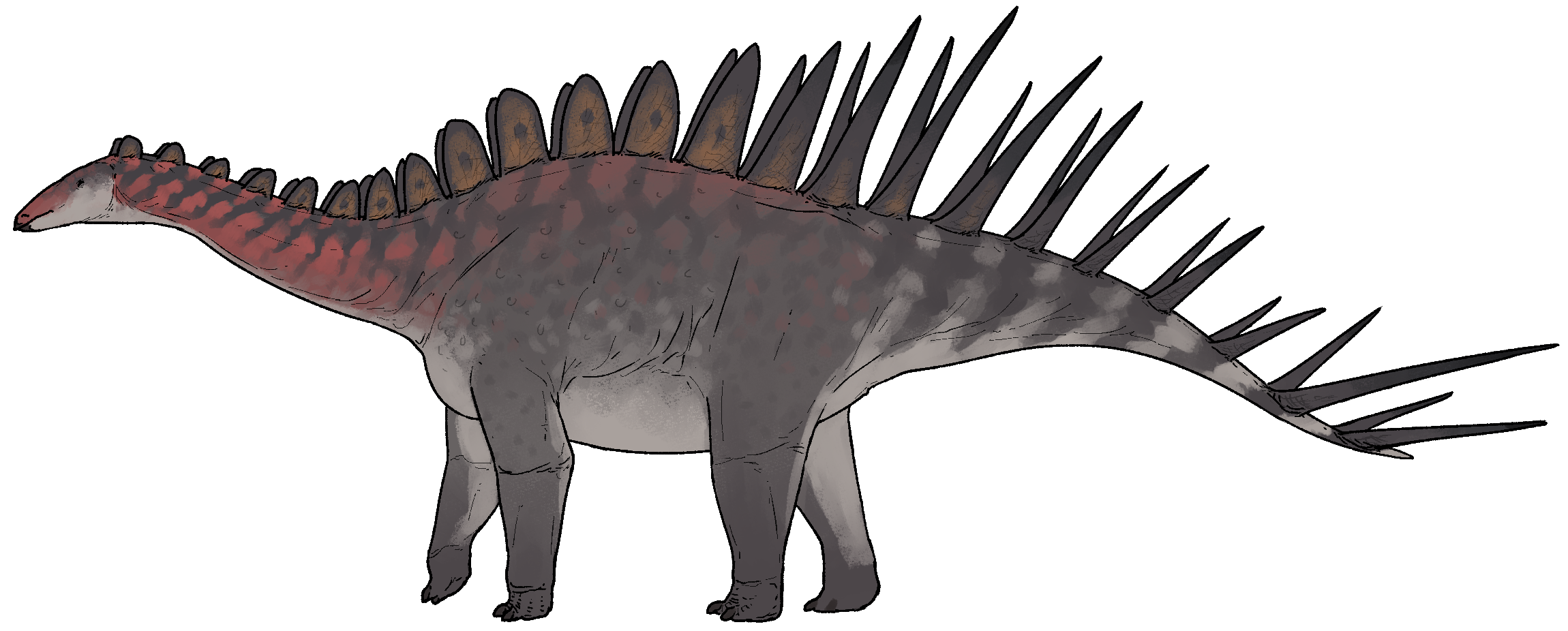
Speculative life restoration

Galton and Carpenter saw the spikes primarily as weapons. They interpreted the side processes of the caudal vertebrae continuing to the very tail end as a support for an increased muscle mass to swing the tail. This might also be connected to the shortening of the caudal vertebrae, resulting in a tail that was about a quarter shorter than in Stegosaurus. A shorter tail could counteract the torsion caused by the greater moment arm of the very long spikes. However, the 2019 reinterpretation of Alcovasaurus as a member of the clade Dacentrurinae also prompted a reinterpretation of the tail anatomy. Rather than having a strongly muscled tail tip, Alcovasaurus more likely had very small tail vertebrae past the first third of the tail. Like other dacentrurines, the tail tip probably lacked strong muscles or indeed much soft tissue at all, creating a very flexible, whip-like tail that could be propelled by the heavily muscled tail base.

== Classification ==
Galton and Carpenter considered Alcovasaurus a member of the Stegosauridae, not more closely related to Kentrosaurus than to Stegosaurus. A 2017 phylogeny of stegosaurids by Thomas Raven and Susannah Maidment found that Alcovasaurus lacked the fusion between the trochanters of the femur seen in adult eurypodans (stegosaurians and ankylosaurians), precluding a confident placement as a stegosaur. However, this may be due to the specimen's immaturity, which is impossible to verify since the holotype has been lost. In 2019, Costa and Mateus reinterpreted Alcovasaurus in the context of newly recognized specimens of Miragaia found in Portugal. These remains allowed them to recognize Alcovasaurus as a close relative of Miragaia, within the stegosaurid clade Dacentrurinae. Because Alcovasaurus shared most of its traits with either Dacentrurus or Miragaia, Costa and Mateus concluded that it would by definition belong to one of them; they chose Miragaia to which it was most similar. It remained a separate species though, for which they coined the newly combined name Miragaia longispinus. This combination has not been followed by later research.

A 2025 publication by Sánchez-Fenollosa & Cobos included Alcovasaurus in a phylogenetic analysis and recovered it as the earliest-diverging dacentrurine within the Stegosauridae. These results are displayed in the cladogram below:

- Stegosauria
  - Huayangosauridae
    ⊞
    - Isaberrysaura
    - - - Bashanosaurus
        - Huayangosaurus
      - - Baiyinosaurus
        - Gigantspinosaurus
    ⊟
  - Stegosauridae
    - Chungkingosaurus
    - - - Tuojiangosaurus
        - Paranthodon
      - Neostegosauria
        - Dacentrurinae
          - Alcovasaurus
          - - Kentrosaurus
            - - Thyreosaurus
              - - Adratiklit
                - Dacentrurus
                  (including Miragaia)
        - Stegosaurinae
          ⊞
          - - - Qigu Formation stegosaur
              - Loricatosaurus
            - - Hesperosaurus
              - Stegosaurus stenops
          - - Jiangjunosaurus
            - - Hekou Group stegosaur
              - - Wuerhosaurus homheni
                - Yanbeilong
          ⊟

== See also ==
- Timeline of stegosaur research
