= El Mers Group =

Geological group in the Middle Atlas of Morocco

- Stratigraphic range: Bajocian-Callovian; ~168–161 Ma
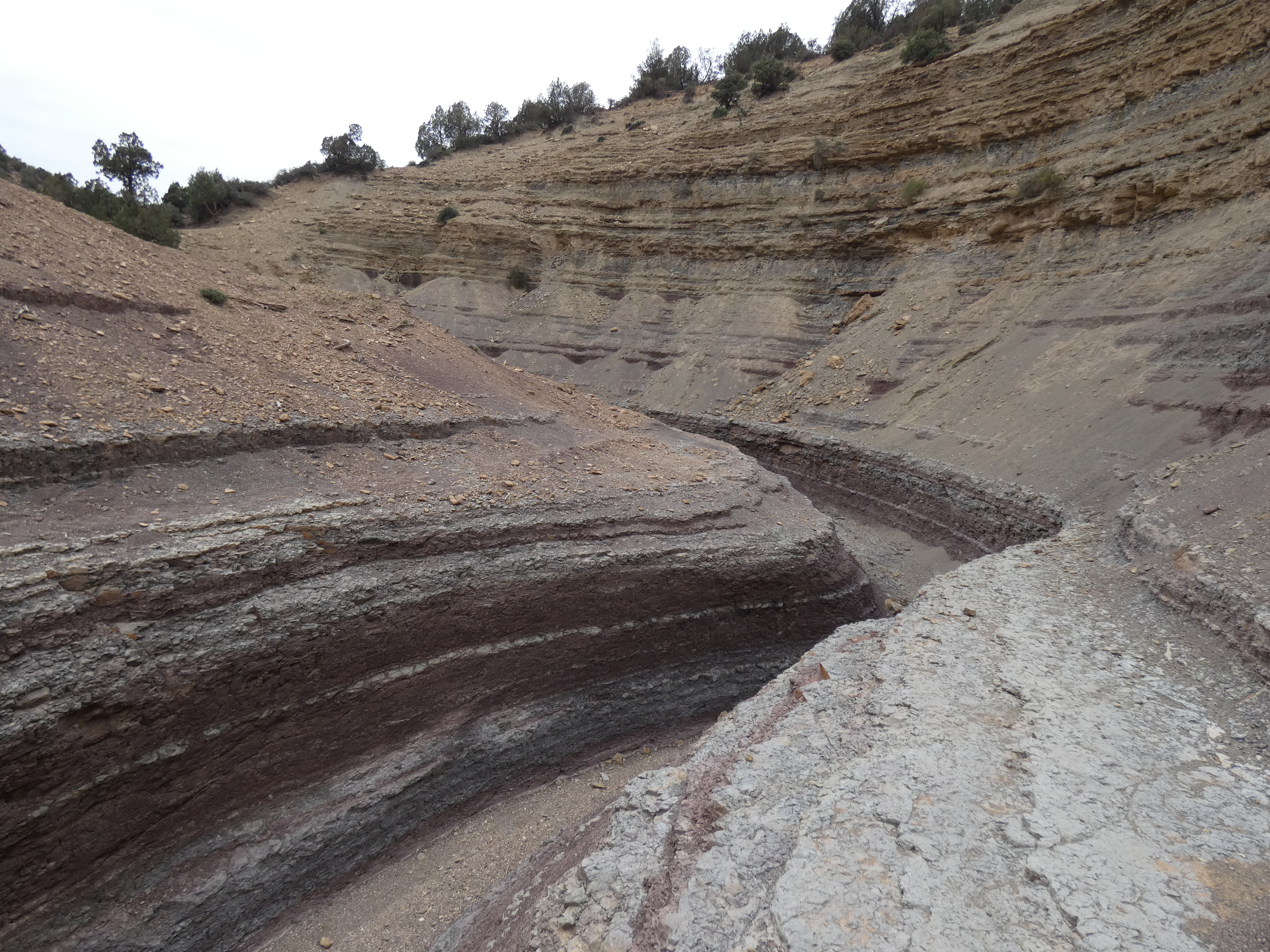
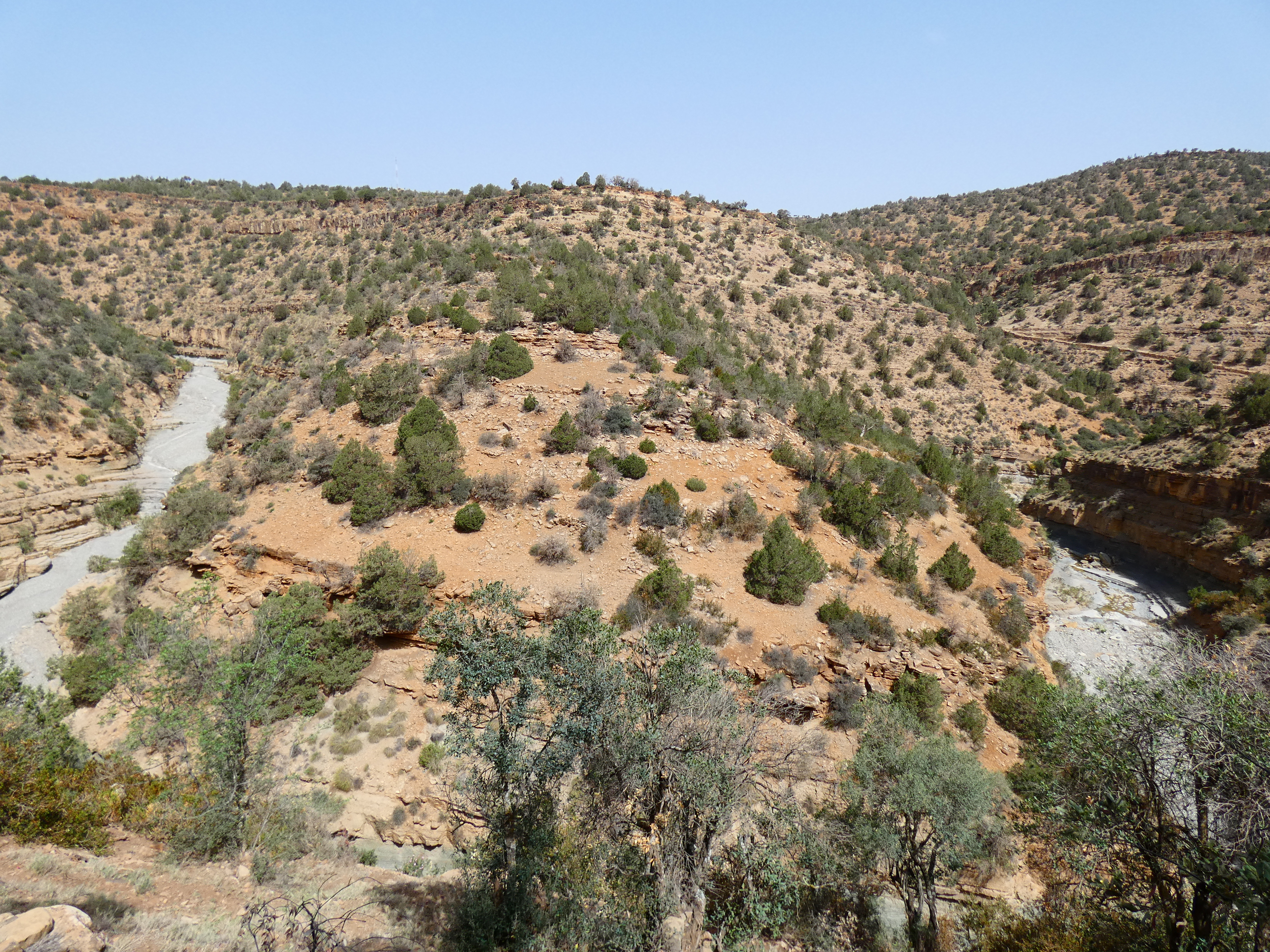
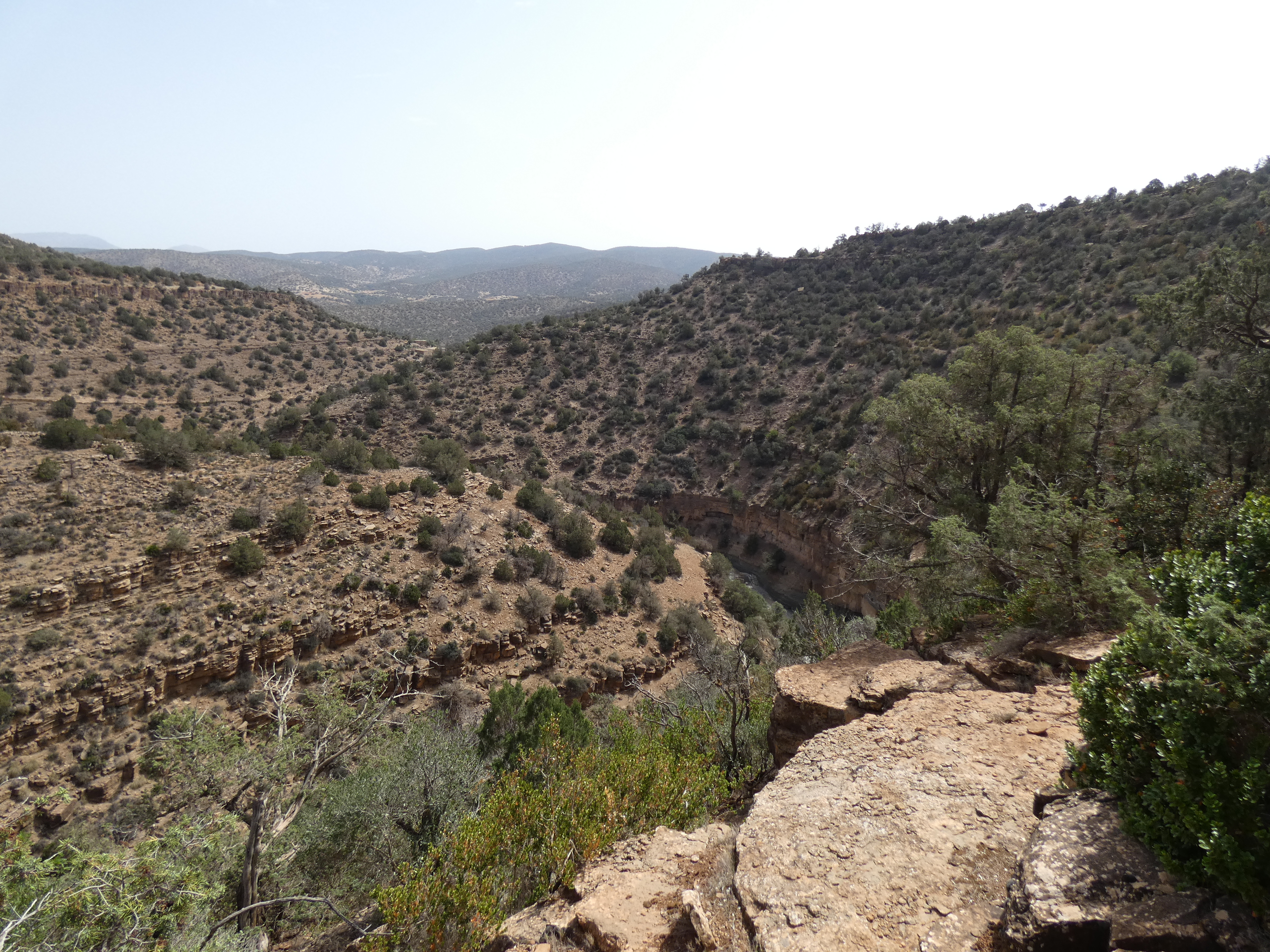
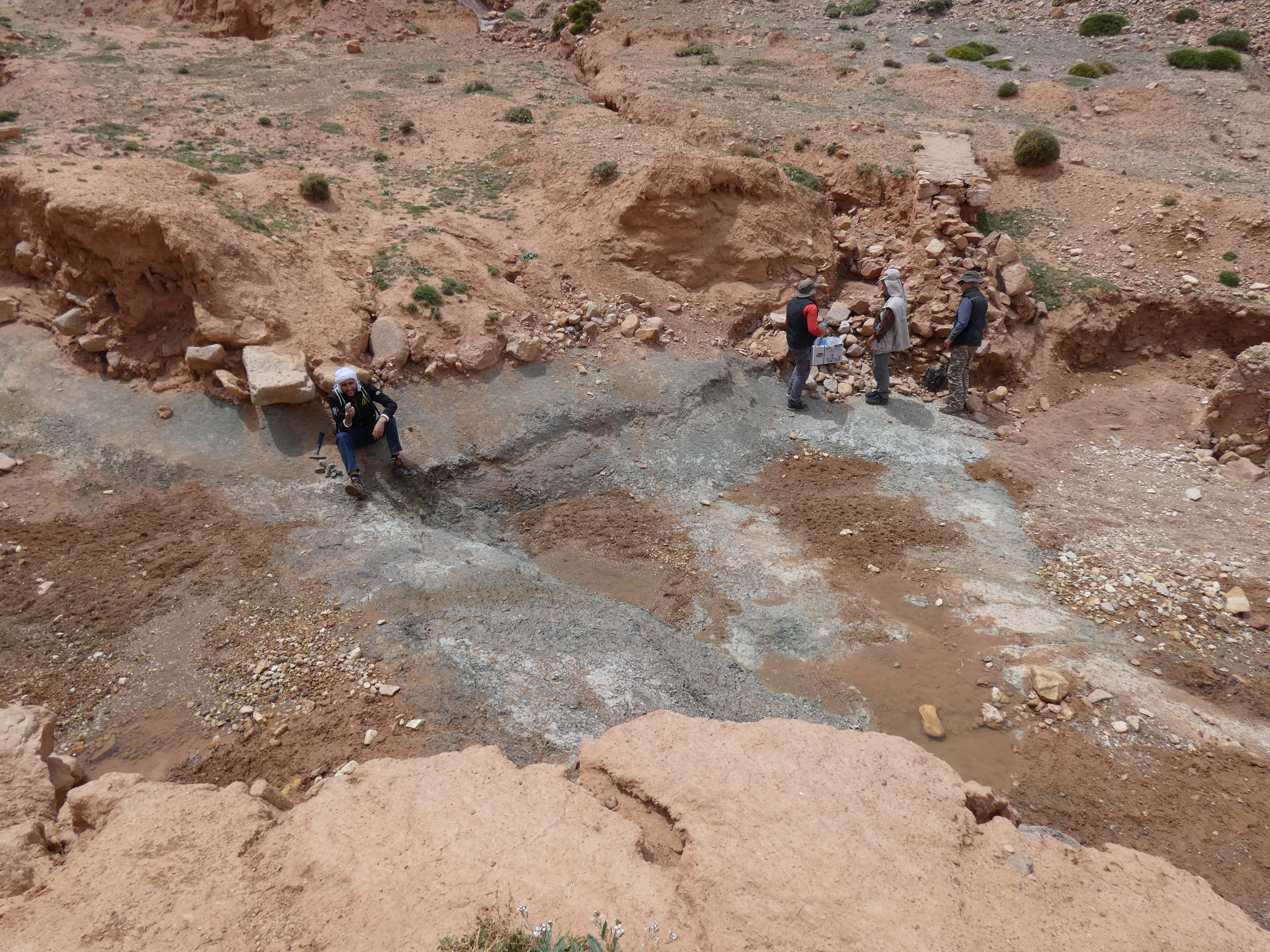
- El Mers I Formation at Thaghzout river canyon El Mers II along the El Mers river El Mers II along the El Mers river El Mers III Dinosaur Bearing beds
- Type: Group
- Sub-units: El Mers Formations 1–3
- Underlies: Unconformity with Barremian or Plio-Pleistocene sediments
- Overlies: Ich Timellaline–Bou Akrabene Formation
- Thickness: Over 500 m (1,600 ft)

Lithology
- Primary: Marl, gypsum (only in unit 3)
- Other: Sandstone, limestone

Location
- Coordinates: 33.5°N 4.3°W
- Approximate paleocoordinates: 28.3°N 2.0°W
- Region: Boulemane and Azilal Provinces
- Country: Morocco
- Extent: Middle Atlas
- El Mers Group (Morocco)

The El Mers Group is a geological group in the Middle Atlas of Morocco. It is subdivided into three formations named the El Mers I, II, and III Formations, respectively. It is a marine deposit primarily consisting of marl, with gypsum present in the upper part of unit 3. It is the lateral equivalent of the terrestrial Guettioua Sandstone. Dinosaur remains are among the fossils that have been recovered from the group, most notably those of sauropods and the unusual thyreophorans Adratiklit, Thyreosaurus, and Spicomellus. This formation records a series of coastal to shallow marine settings of Middle Jurassic (with an age of Bajocian-Bathonian for El Mers 1 and a Bathonian-Callovian? for El Mers II-III), based on detailed stratigraphical biomarkers such as ammonites or Foranimifera.

== Paleoenvironment ==
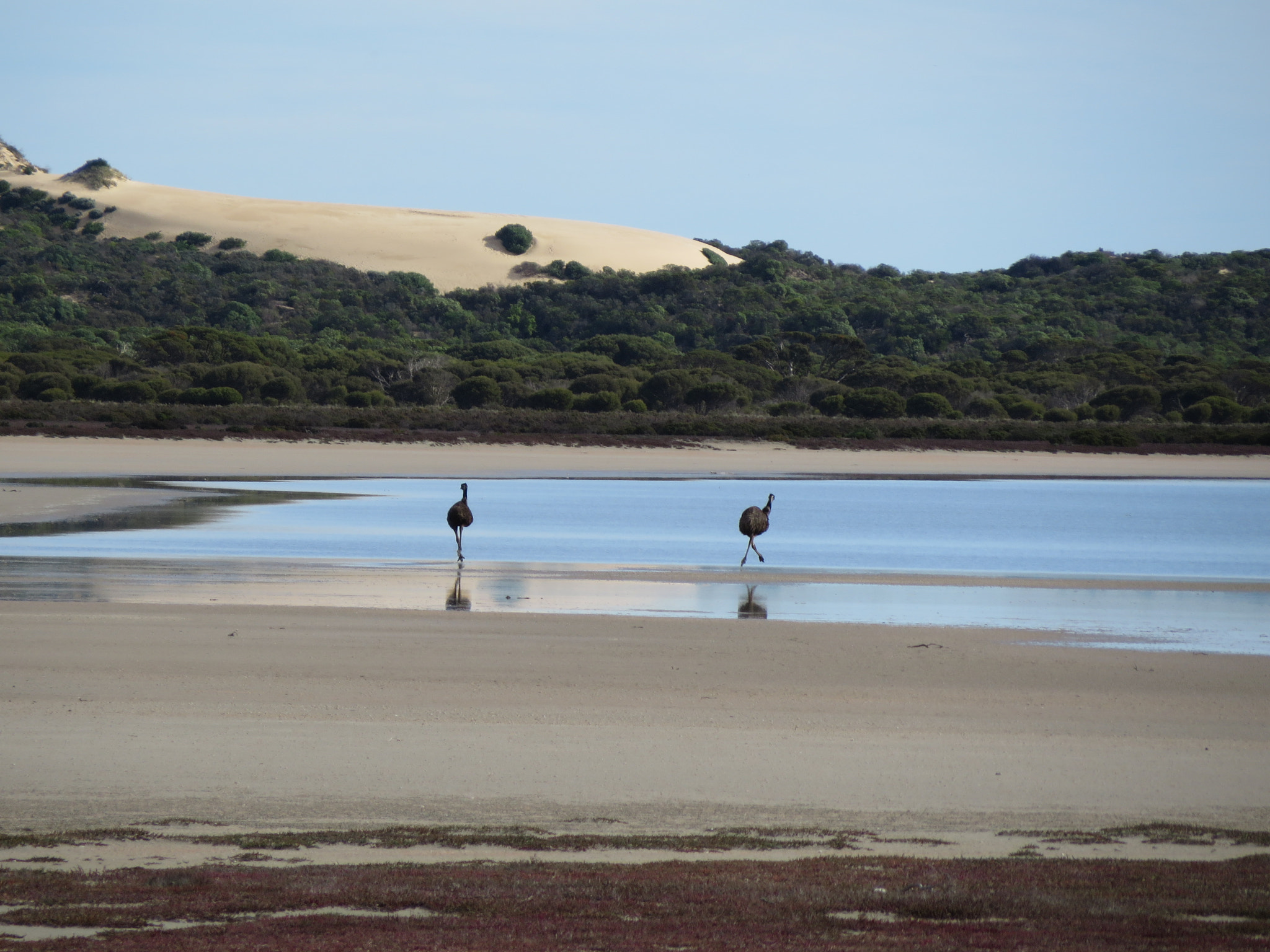
A Modern analogue for El Mers Group is found in the coastal sequences of Coorong, South Australia.

The El Mers formations are composed primarily of marls with intermittent layers of limestone and sandstone, characterized by abundant organic matter and benthic fauna. It is delineated into five distinct members, each exhibiting diverse lithological characteristics. The three members comprise a combination of layers of marls, sandstones, and limestones, marked by various unique fossils and organic materials. Sedimentary discontinuities reveal deltaic sequences that exhibit varying sedimentary structures and lithological compositions, reflecting dynamic depositional environments ranging from subtidal to continental. The facies associations within the El Mers Group are organized into elementary and mesosequences, delineating the transition from prodelta to deltaic plain environments. These sequences capture the evolution of tidal regimes and depositional dynamics.

During the Bajocian-Bathonian transition the local faices paint a picture of a dynamic paleoenvironment, where the interplay between land and sea was pronounced. This setting oscillated between a proximal continental shelf, marked by significant terrestrial input, and episodic marine incursions that suggest fluctuating sea levels. The lower parts of the section hint at shallow, sometimes oxygen-deprived, stagnant waters, much like modern lagoon or restricted bays where circulation is limited. Upwards there are signs of marine influence growing stronger, particularly at the base of "Interval C", where a notable sea-level rise seems to have occurred, akin to what we might see on today's outer continental shelves, like those in the North Sea, where marine life diversity peaks, specially Bivalves and Ammonites. However, this marine dominance is not consistent, reverting back to a more coastal, land-influenced environment towards the top, similar to modern deltaic regions where riverine and marine waters mix, such as the Louisiana coast or the Coorong National Park. The environment would have experienced variable salinity, much like estuaries where fresh and marine waters blend, affecting the types of biota that could thrive.

The shifts in facies and microfauna evolution in the area revelated intriguing patterns, from the establishment of initial supratidal environments characterized by charophytic marls and ostracod limestones followed by a resurgence of marine conditions, evident from the reappearance of coastal facies and the diversification of ostracod faunas, indicating a significant transgressive phase during the Upper Bathonian–Lower Callovian period. While in the Central High Atlas marine influences ceased by the Upper Bajocian–Lower Bathonian giving way to continental red layers, in the Middle Atlas marine influences persisted until the Upper Bathonian–Lower Callovian boundary, indicating a diachronic filling of the Atlas gulfs towards the Tethyan domain from west to east.

== Fossils ==
Color key: Taxon / Reclassified taxon / Taxon falsely reported as present / Dubious taxon or junior synonym / Ichnotaxon / Ootaxon / Morphotaxon	Notes; Uncertain or tentative taxa are in small text; ~~crossed out~~ taxa are discredited.

=== Foraminifera ===
Genus	Species	Stratigraphic position	Material	Notes	Images
Bullopora	B. tuberculata	SW part of the Skoura syncline	Tests/Shells	A benthic foraminiferan of the family Polymorphinidae	
Pfenderella	P. cf. arabica	SW part of the Skoura syncline	Tests/Shells	A benthic foraminiferan of the family Pfenderininae	
Praekurnubia	P. crusei	SW part of the Skoura syncline	Tests/Shells	A benthic foraminiferan of the family Pfenderinidae; a genus found in the Tethys between Bajocian and Oxfordian-aged layers	
Pseudocyclammina	P. maynci	SW part of the Skoura syncline	Tests/Shells	A benthic foraminiferan of the family Hauraniidae	

=== Dinoflagellates ===
Genus	Species	Stratigraphic position	Material	Notes	Images
Aldorfia	A. aldorfensis	FD section, Skoura Syncline	Cysts	A Dinoflagellate of the family Gonyaulacaceae	
Cribroperidinium	C. crispum; C. venustum	FD section, Skoura Syncline	Cysts	A Dinoflagellate of the family Gonyaulacaceae	
Ctenidodinium	C. combazii; C. continuum; C. cornigerum	FD section, Skoura Syncline	Cysts	A Dinoflagellate, incertae sedis	
Dichadogonyaulax	D. sellwoodii	FD section, Skoura Syncline	Cysts	A Dinoflagellate, incertae sedis	
Korystocysta	K. gochtii; K. pachyderma	FD section, Skoura Syncline	Cysts	A Dinoflagellate of the family Gonyaulacaceae	
Meiourogonyaulax	M. caytonensis; M. reticulata; M. valensii	FD section, Skoura Syncline	Cysts	A Dinoflagellate of the family Gonyaulacaceae	
Nannoceratopsis	N. deflandrei	FD section, Skoura Syncline	Cysts	A Dinoflagellate of the family Nannoceratopsiaceae	
Pareodinia	P. ceratophora	FD section, Skoura Syncline	Cysts	A Dinoflagellate of the family Pareodiniaceae	
Rhynchodiniopsis	R. cladophora	FD section, Skoura Syncline	Cysts	A Dinoflagellate of the family Gonyaulacaceae	
Trichodinium	T. scarburghense	FD section, Skoura Syncline	Cysts	A Dinoflagellate of the family Gonyaulacaceae	
Tubotuberella	T. dangeardii	FD section, Skoura Syncline	Cysts	A Dinoflagellate of the family Gonyaulacaceae	
Wanaea	W. acollaris; W. indotata; W. verrucosa	FD section, Skoura Syncline	Cysts	A Dinoflagellate of the family Gonyaulacaceae	
Willeidinum	W. spp.	FD section, Skoura Syncline	Cysts	A Dinoflagellate, incertae sedis	

=== Brachiopoda ===
Genus	Species	Stratigraphic position	Material	Notes	Images
Cymatorhynchia	C. quadriplicata	El Mers	Isolated shells	A branchipod of the family Tetrarhynchidae	
Daghanirhynchia	D. termierae	El Mers	Isolated shells	A branchipod of the family Tetrarhynchidae	
Formosarhynchia	F. (Rhynchonella?) dumortieri	El Mers	Isolated shells	A branchipod of the family Rhynchonellidae	Example of specimen of the genus (from Spain)
Rugitela	R. praebullata	El Mers	Isolated shells	A branchipod of the family Zeilleriaceae	
Stiphrothyris	S. mouterdei	El Mers	Isolated shells	A branchipod of the family Lobothyrididae	
Tubithyris	T. chouberti; T. cf. wrighti	El Mers	Isolated shells	A branchipod of the family Lobothyrididae	
Zeilleria	Z. subbucculenta	El Mers	Isolated shells	A branchipod of the family Zeilleriaceae	Zeilleria specimens (from Spain)

=== Ostracoda ===
Genus	Species	Stratigraphic position	Material	Notes	Images
Cytherella	C. index	Ait Hammou	Valves	A freshwater/brackish ostracod of the family Cytherellidae	
Fastigatocythere	F. aff. brentonensis	Ait Hammou	Valves	A freshwater/brackish ostracod of the family Progonocytheridae	
Kinkelinella	K. aff. triangula	Ait Hammou	Valves	A freshwater ostracod of the family Progonocytheridae	
Metacypris	M. spp.	Ait Hammou	Valves	A freshwater ostracod of the family Limnocytheridae. Local members of the genus would not be confined to limnic environments, but would be euryhaline or brackish, since they disappear when faunal diversity is at its maximum.	
Procytheridea	P. ihopyensis	Ait Hammou	Valves	A freshwater ostracod of the family Schulerideidae	

=== Xiphosura ===
Genus	Species	Stratigraphic position	Material	Notes	Images
Selenichnites	S. tesiltus; S. isp.	El Mers; Tassmante O'Moche	Isolated crescent-shaped trace fossils	Traces of xiphosurans, representing the second occurrence of this ichnogenus in Morocco	Extant Horseshoe crab (in New York state)

=== Mollusca ===
Genus	Species	Stratigraphic position	Material	Notes	Images
Astarte	A. cf. rayensis	El Mers; Skoura syncline	Isolated Shells	A marine clam of the family Astartidae	Example of member of the genus (from Germany)
Cadomites	C. bremeri; C. cf. bremeri	East Skoura syncline	Isolated shells	An ammonite of the family Stephanoceratidae and indicator of the Bathonian age	Example of specimens (from France)
Cercomya	C. undulata	El Mers	Isolated shells	A marine clam of the family Laternulidae	
Choffatia	C. cf. urinacensis	East Skoura syncline	Isolated shells	An ammonite of the family Perisphinctidae and indicator of the Callovian age	
Corbula	C. pectinata; C. lyrata	Aït Kermouss	Isolated shells	A marine clam of the family Corbulidae	
Clydoniceras	C. discus	Tamguert n'Tarit; Tizi n'Juillerh	Isolated shells	An ammonite of the family Clydoniceratidae	
Eomiodon	E. angulatus; E. gardeti; E. algeriensis; E. indicus	El Mers; Skoura syncline	Isolated Shells	A marine clam of the family Neomiodontidae	
Isognomon	I. (Mythiloperna) murchisoni	El Mers	Isolated shells	A marine oyster of the family Malleidae	Example of extant member of the genus (from Cape Verde)
Lima	L. (Plagiostoma) subcardiformis	Aït Kermouss	Isolated shells	A marine file clam of the family Limidae	Example of extant member of the genus (from Puerto Rico)
Liostrea	L. sandalina	El Mers; Skoura syncline	Isolated Shells	A marine oyster of the family Ostreidae	
Lopha	L. costata	Aït Kermouss	Isolated shells	A marine oyster of the family Ostreidae	Example of extant member of the genus (from Micronesia)
Modiolus	M. imbricatus; M. cf. bipartitus	Aït Kermouss; El Mers; Tamguert n'Tarit	Isolated shells	A marine mussel of the family Mytilidae	Example of extant member of the genus (from Philippines)
Morphoceras	M. macrescens	East Skoura syncline	Isolated shells	An ammonite of the family Morphoceratidae and indicator of the Bathonian age	
Mytilus	M. (Falcimytilus) tumidus	Aït Kermouss	Isolated shells	A marine mussel of the family Mytilidae	Example of extant member of the genus (from France)
Neomiodon	N. skouraensis	El Mers; Skoura syncline	Isolated Shells	A marine clam of the family Neomiodontidae	
Nucula	N. (Paleonucula) waltoni	El Mers	Isolated shells	A marine nut clam of the family Nuculanidae	Example of extant member of the genus (from Massachusetts)
Oraniceras	O. sp.	East Skoura syncline	Isolated shells	An ammonite of the family Parkinsoniidae and indicator of the Bathonian age	
Orionoides	O. cf. pseudorion	East Skoura syncline	Isolated shells	An ammonite of the family Perisphinctidae	
Ostrea	O. sandalina; O. (Liostrea) hebridica	Aït Kermouss; El Mers; Tamguert n'Tarit	Isolated shells	A marine oyster of the family Ostreidae	Example of extant member of the genus (from Croatia)
Oxyeurax	O. fimbriata	Aït Kermouss; El Mers; Tamguert n'Tarit	Isolated shells	A marine clam of the family Astartidae	
Paracenoceras	P. sp.	Aït Kermouss	Isolated shells	A Nautilidan of the family Paracenoceratidae	Example of specimen (from an unknown location)
Parkinsonia	P. sp.	Skoura syncline	Isolated shells	An ammonite of the family Parkinsoniidae and indicator of the Bajocian age for the lower portions of the Group	Example of specimen (from England)
Protocardia	P. tikechkachensis	El Mers; Tamguert n'Tarit	Isolated shells	A marine cockle of the family Cardiidae	
Trigonia	T. kheraensis	El Mers; Skoura syncline	Isolated Shells	A marine clam of the family Trigoniidae	Example of specimen (from Haarlem)

=== Echinoderms ===
Genus	Species	Stratigraphic position	Material	Notes	Images
Acrosalenia	A. spinosa	El Mers; Ich Timellaline	Isolated Individuals	An Echinoidean of the family Acrosaleniidae	
Hemicidaris	H. jauberti; H. cf. icaunensis	Ich Timellaline	Isolated Individuals	An Echinoidean of the family Hemicidaridae	Example of specimen of the genus (from Switzerland)

=== Fishes ===
Genus	Species	Stratigraphic position	Material	Notes	Images
Scheenstia	S. cf. mantelli; S ("Lepidotes") ssp.	Ait Hammou; Djmila; Oued El Mers; Tizi n'Juillerh	Partial specimen wirth cranial material; Referred cranial material, isolated teeth and scales	A marine/brackish bony fish of the family Lepidotidae	Reconstruction

=== Testudinata ===
Genus	Species	Stratigraphic position	Material	Notes	Images
Testudinata indet.	Indeterminate	Tamguert n'Tarit; Tizi n'Juillerh	Very numerous debris: escutcheons, plates, vertebrae, ribs, long bones	Turtle remains of uncertain affinity	

=== Crocodylomorpha ===
Genus	Species	Stratigraphic position	Material	Notes	Images
Hatcherichnus	H. ispp.	Inzar O'Founass	Footprints	Indeterminate Crocodrylomorph Tracks	
"Megalosaurus"	"M." mersensis	Botane; Tizi n'Juillerh	Isolated teeth and vertebra	A marine crocodylomorph of the family Teleosauridae. Mistaken as Theropod remains in the past.	
Steneosaurus?	S.? spp.	Bou Iferaoun; Botane; Darak; Djmila; Oued Tamemecht; Tamguert r'Tane; Tirardine; Tissenfelt	Isolated teeth, cranial and postcranial material, both isolated and semi-articulated	A marine crocodylomorph of the family Teleosauridae. The referral to the genus Steneosaurus should be taken with caution, as this genus was overlumped.	

=== Dinosauria ===
==== Theropoda ====
Genus	Species	Stratigraphic position	Material	Notes	Images
Carmelopodus	cf.C. isp.	Tassmante O'Moche	Footprints	Theropod tracks of uncertain affinity, suggested to come from Ceratosauria members	
Grallator?	G.? isp.	Ifri N'Tfrane	Footprints	Theropod Tracks, referred usually to small-medium sized Genera	
Hispanosauropus?	H.? isp.	Ifri N'Tfrane	Footprints	Theropod tracks of uncertain affinity, different from Megalosauripus in the larger metatarsophalangeal region	
Megalosauripus	M. ispp.; cf.M. ispp.	El Mers; Tasra; Tasra Westbank; Tassmante O'Moche; Oued Tamghilt	Footprints	Traces of theropods; members of the ichnofamily Eubrontidae, incertae sedis within Theropoda	
Averostra indet.	Indeterminate	Oued Botane	Isolated Teeth	Isolated teeth of unidentified or undescribed/studied theropods. Teeth associated with the Teleosaur "Megalosaurus" mersensis have recently been suggesting to come from indeterminate Averostrans. Other remains need revision.	
"Saurexallopus"	cf.S. isp.	El Mers; Inzar O'Founass	Footprints	Simulates "four-toed" theropod but reinterpreted as entry traces with exit from "heel" area, and is likely a nomina dubia	
Theropodipedia indet.	Indeterminate	El Mers; Inzar O'Founass; Ifri N'Tfrane; Laach O'Medda; Oulad Ali; Tasra; Tasra Westbank; Tassmante O'Moche	Footprints	Theropod tracks of uncertain affinity, suggested to come from "allosaurs or megalosaurs" Includes regular theropod-like penetrative tracks, small/short tracks with reduced outer digits, scratch marks/swimming traces U-shaped rear with outward-curving outer digits and tracks with "wrinkle structures".	

==== Sauropoda ====
Genus	Species	Stratigraphic position	Material	Notes	Images
Breviparopus	B. isp.	El Mers; Oued Tamghilt	Footprints	Traces of sauropods typical of the ichnofamily Parabrontopodidae, incertae sedis within Sauropodomorpha. Includes traces with pes similar to Diplodocoidea.	
Cetiosaurus	"C." mogrebiensis	Aîn ou N'Jourh; Taghrout; Tamguert r'Tane; Tamguert n'Tarit; Tich Niouine; Oued Botane	Complete skeleton and referred co-types of partially complete and incomplete specimens	A eusauropod of the family Cetiosauridae, currently awaiting revision and likely not a member of the genus Cetiosaurus.	
Eusauropoda indet.	Indeterminate	Aït Tamjout; Boulahfa; 1 km east of Taguelft	More than 45 pieces: 2 long femora, large vertebrae and other remains	The remains include gigantic bones of an animal of very large dimensions: a femur measures 236 cm.	
Sauropodina	Indeterminate	El Mers; Tasra; Tasra Westbank; Oulad Ali	Footprints	Sauropod tracks of uncertain affinity. There are both small and enormous sauropod tracks, including some among the largest known worldwide, with a pes track length of up to 130 cm.	
Turiasauria indet.	Indeterminate	Boulahfa	USMBA 002–004, three isolated teeth	Teeth suggesting the oldest known African turiasaur	

==== Ornithischia ====
Genus	Species	Stratigraphic position	Material	Notes	Images
Adratiklit	A. boulahfa	Boulahfa	NHMUK PV R37366 (A dorsal vertebra), three cervical vertebrae (NHMUK PV R37367; R37368), a dorsal vertebra (NHMUK PV R37365), and a left humerus (NHMUK PV R37007)	A dacentrurine stegosaur	Adratiklit boulahfa Spicomellus afer Thyreosaurus atlasicus
Cerapoda indet.	Indeterminate	Boulahfa	USMBA 001, a partial left femur	The oldest known cerapodan dinosaur	Adratiklit boulahfa Spicomellus afer Thyreosaurus atlasicus
Ornithopodichnus?	O.? ispp.	Ifri N'Tfrane	Footprints	Ornithichian tracks, referred to short-toed forms such as Gilmoreosaurus	Adratiklit boulahfa Spicomellus afer Thyreosaurus atlasicus
Spicomellus	S. afer	Boulahfa	NHMUK PV R37412, a partial rib bearing four co-ossified spines; USMBA 84, a partial skeleton including dermal armour.	An early ankylosaurian	Adratiklit boulahfa Spicomellus afer Thyreosaurus atlasicus
Thyreosaurus	T. atlasicus	Boulahfa North	HIIUC-BN00, a partial postcranial skeleton that includes nine dorsal vertebrae and 21 dorsal rib remains, a limb bone (fibula?), and six dermal elements	A dacentrurine stegosaur with unusual recumbent osteoderms	Adratiklit boulahfa Spicomellus afer Thyreosaurus atlasicus

=== Dasycladales ===
Genus	Species	Stratigraphic position	Material	Notes	Images
Heteroporella	H. lusitanica	SW part of the Skoura syncline	Calcareous imprints	A dasycladacean algae of the family Dasycladaceae	
Sarfiatella	S. dubari	SW part of the Skoura syncline	Calcareous imprints	A dasycladacean algae, associated in adjacent regions with Aalenian–Bajocian faunas	

=== Charophyta ===
Genus	Species	Stratigraphic position	Material	Notes	Images
Porochara	P. hians	Ait Hammou	Oogonia	A characean algae of the family Porocharaceae; charophytes are abundant in lower levels, associated with freshwater ostracods	Example of modern characean algae

=== Plantae ===
Genus	Species	Stratigraphic position	Material	Notes	Images
Araucariacites	A. australis	FD section, Skoura Syncline	Pollen	Affinities with Araucariaceae inside Coniferae.	Example of extant Araucaria cones
Callialasporites	C. dampieri; C. segmentatus; C. turbatus; C. spp.	FD section, Skoura Syncline	Pollen	Affinities with Araucariaceae inside Coniferae.	Example of extant Araucaria cones
Classopollis	C. (Corollina) spp.	FD section, Skoura Syncline	Pollen	Affinities with Cheirolepidiaceae inside Coniferae.	
Cyathidites	C. ssp.	FD section, Skoura Syncline	Spores	Affinities with the family Cyatheaceae inside Cyatheales. Arboreal Fern Spores	Modern Cyathea, Cyathidites come probably from similar genera
Densoisporites	D. spp.	FD section, Skoura Syncline	Spores	Affinities with the Selaginellaceae in the Lycopsida.	Modern Selaginella. Densoisporites probably come from a similar Plant
Lycopodiumsporites	L. austroclavatidites; L. spp.	FD section, Skoura Syncline	Spores	Affinities with the family Lycopodiaceae in the Lycopodiopsida. Lycopod spores, related to herbaceous flora common in humid environments.	Modern Lycopodium. Lycopodiumsporites probably come from a similar plant
Protocupressinoxylon	P. choubertii	Skoura syncline	Fossil wood	Conifer wood of the family Hirmeriellaceae, considered to be a potential synonym of the genus Brachyoxylon	Example of petrified wood trunk of the same genus (from an unknown location)
Protopodocarpoxylon	P. teixeirae	Skoura syncline	Fossil wood	Conifer fossil wood of the family Hirmeriellaceae	

== See also ==
- Tafraout Group (Toarcian–Aalenian)
- Azilal Formation (Toarcian-Aalenian)
- Guettioua Formation (Bathonian–?Callovian)
- Anoual Formation (Bathonian)
- Ksar Metlili Formation (Tithonian–?Berrasian)
