= Thyreosaurus =

Thyreosaurus Temporal range: Middle Jurassic, Bathonian
- Skeletal reconstruction without dorsal plates

Scientific classification
- Kingdom: Animalia
- Phylum: Chordata
- Class: Reptilia
- Clade: Dinosauria
- Clade: †Ornithischia
- Clade: †Thyreophora
- Clade: †Stegosauria
- Family: †Stegosauridae
- Subfamily: †Dacentrurinae
- Genus: †Thyreosaurus; Zafaty et al., 2024
- Species: †T. atlasicus

Binomial name
- †Thyreosaurus atlasicus Zafaty et al., 2024

Extinct genus of stegosaurian dinosaurs

Thyreosaurus is an extinct genus of stegosaurian dinosaur from the Middle Jurassic El Mers III Formation of Morocco. The genus contains a single species, Thyreosaurus atlasicus, known from a partial disarticulated skeleton consisting of several dorsal vertebrae, ribs, a limb bone, and dermal bones. Thyreosaurus is characterized by a unique dermal armor with an asymmetrical texture, indicating that it may have been recumbent. Alongside Adratiklit, Thyreosaurus increases the diversity of unique stegosaurs occurring in the Middle Jurassic of Africa.

== Discovery and naming ==
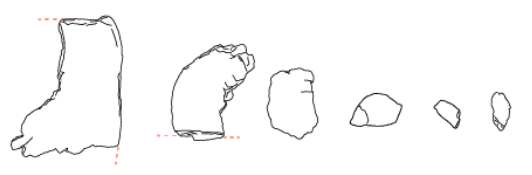
Osteoderms of the holotype

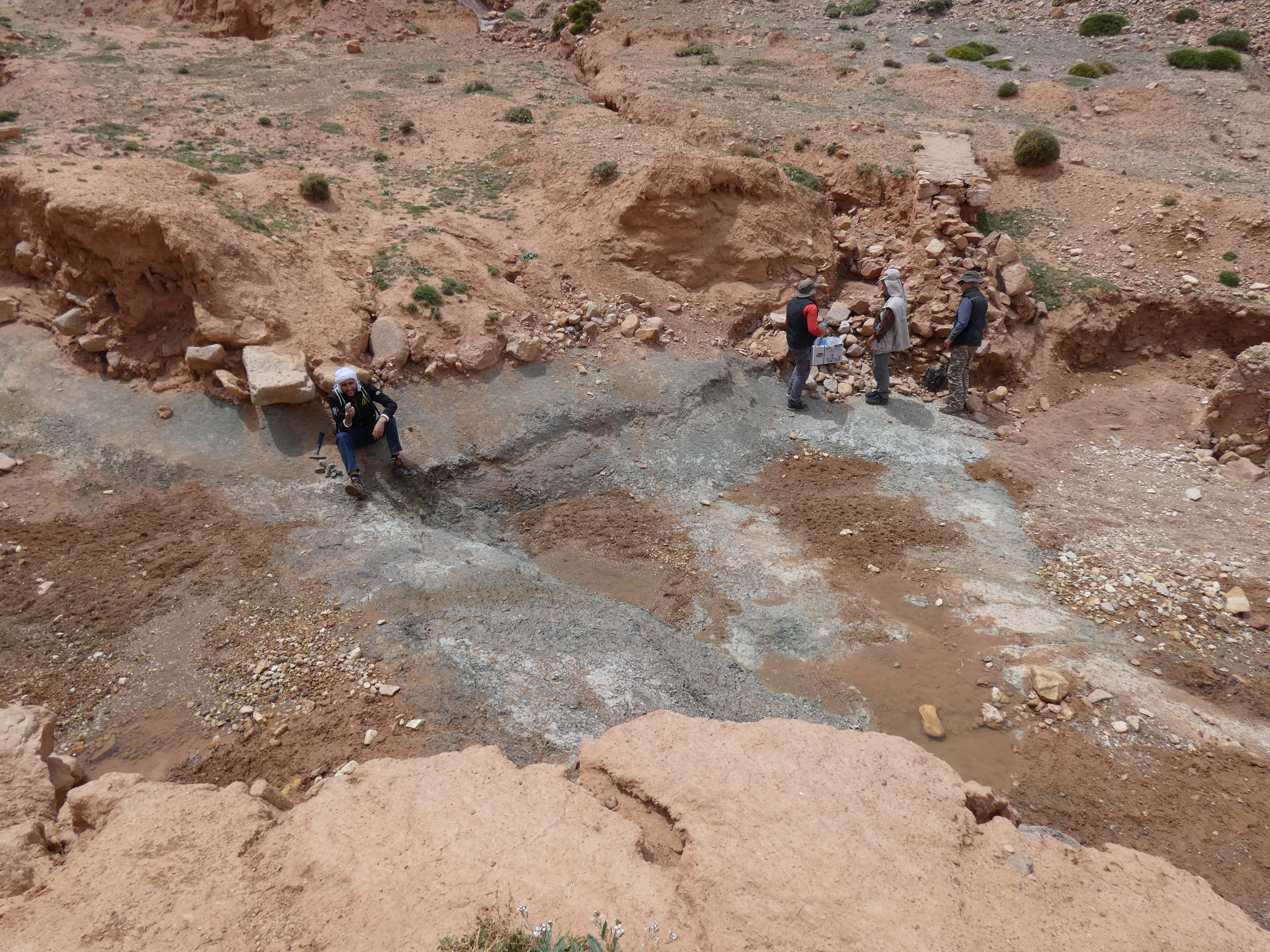
Empty excavation site of Thyreosaurus, with Omar Zafaty on the left

Thyreosaurus type locality near Boulemane, Morocco

The Thyreosaurus holotype specimen, HIIUC-BN00, was discovered in 2021 in sediments of the El Mers III Formation (El Mers Group, Boulahfa North locality) near Boulemane in the Middle Atlas mountains of Morocco. The specimen—which is associated but disarticulated—consists of nine dorsal vertebrae, 21 fragmentary ribs, a limb bone tentatively described as a fibula, and six osteoderms.

The fossil material was first reported in several conference abstracts in 2022 and 2023 before its formal description.

In 2024, Zafaty et al. described Thyreosaurus atlasicus as a new genus and species of stegosaurian dinosaur based on these fossil remains. The generic name, Thyreosaurus, combines thyreos (θυρεός), the name of an oblong shield used in Ancient Greece—referencing the specimen's unusual osteoderms—with the Greek σαῦρος (sauros), meaning "lizard". The specific name, atlasicus, refers to the Atlas Mountains of Morocco.

== Description ==
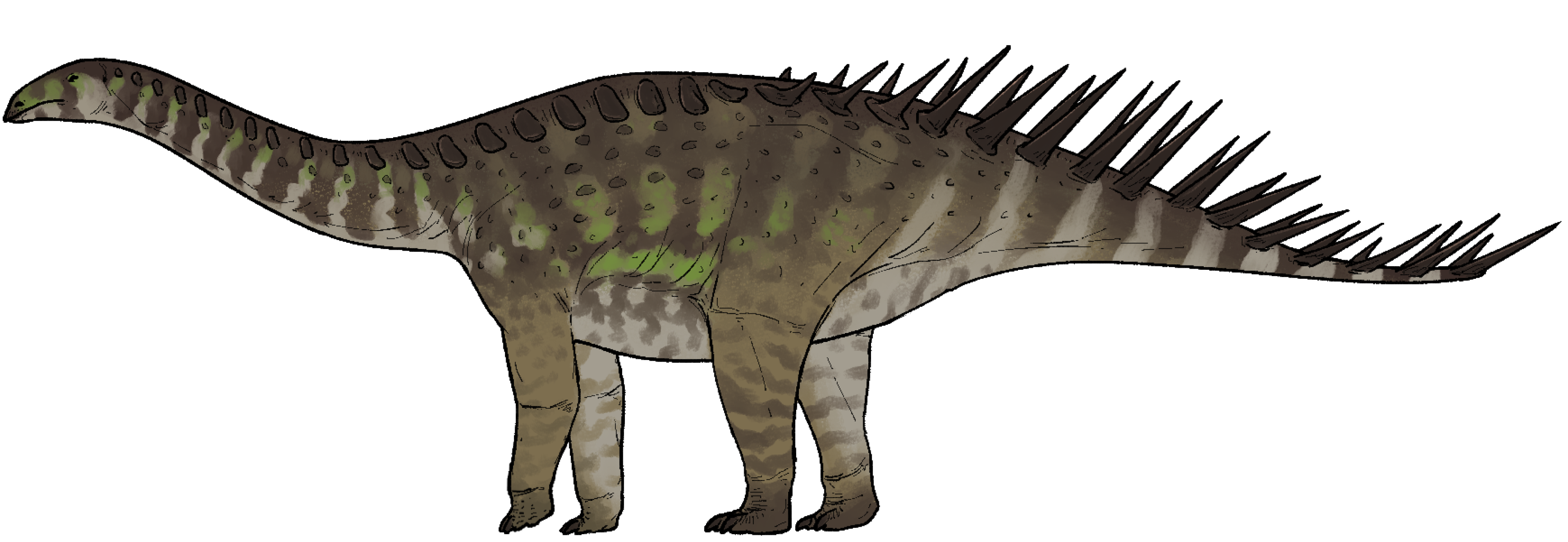
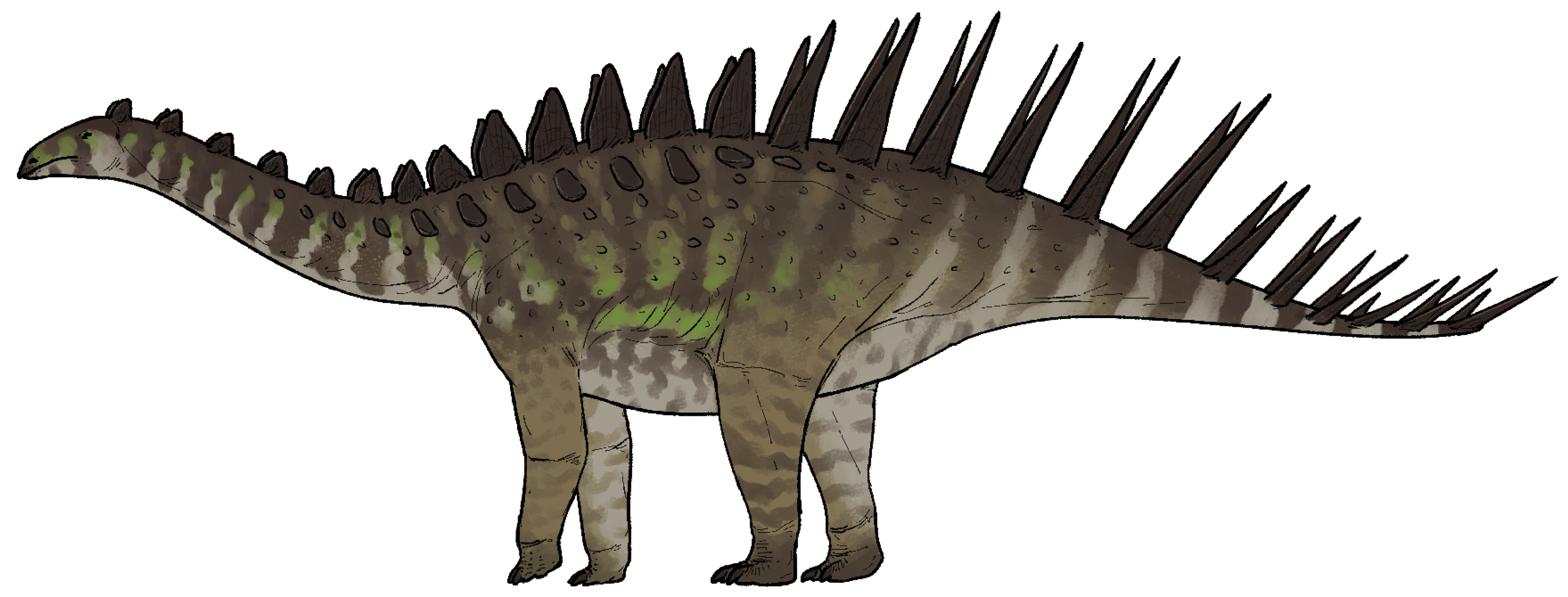
Speculative life restorations illustrating alternate osteoderm arrangements

The holotype of Thyreosaurus belonged to an adult individual with an estimated body length of 6 metres (20 ft), but it was not fully grown. It possessed unique dermal armor that has been compared to that of nodosaurid ankylosaurs, consisting of asymmetrically sided oblong plates that were likely arranged recumbent on the back of the animal, instead of being held erect as in other stegosaurs.

== Classification ==
In their phylogenetic analysis, Zafaty et al. (2024) recovered Thyreosaurus as dacentrurine member of the Stegosauridae, as the sister taxon to Dacentrurus. These species are in turn sister to Adratiklit, a contemporary of Thyreosaurus. Their results are displayed in the cladogram below:

- Stegosauria
  - - Bashanosaurus
    - Chungkingosaurus
  - - Huayangosaurus
    - Stegosauridae
      - - Isaberrysaura
        - Gigantspinosaurus
      - - Alcovasaurus
        - - Jiangjunosaurus
          - - - Tuojiangosaurus
              - Paranthodon
            - - Kentrosaurus
              - - Dacentrurinae
                  - Adratiklit
                  - - Thyreosaurus
                    - Dacentrurus
                - Stegosaurinae
                  - - Miragaia
                    - Hesperosaurus
                  - - Loricatosaurus
                    - - Stegosaurus stenops
                      - Stegosaurus homheni (=Wuerhosaurus)
