= Adratiklit =

Adratiklit Temporal range: Middle Jurassic, Bathonian
- Skeletal reconstruction including all referred bones

Scientific classification
- Kingdom: Animalia
- Phylum: Chordata
- Clade: Dinosauria
- Clade: †Ornithischia
- Clade: †Thyreophora
- Clade: †Stegosauria
- Family: †Stegosauridae
- Genus: †Adratiklit; Maidment et al., 2020
- Species: †A. boulahfa

Binomial name
- †Adratiklit boulahfa Maidment et al., 2020

Extinct genus of dinosaurs

Adratiklit (meaning "mountain lizard") is an extinct genus of stegosaurian dinosaur that lived on the supercontinent Gondwana during the Middle Jurassic (Bathonian age). The genus contains a single species, Adratiklit boulahfa. Its remains were found in the El Mers III Formation, near Boulemane in north Morocco.

Eurypodan dinosaurs, in particular stegosaurs, were diverse and abundant in Laurasia (nowadays the northern continents) during the Jurassic, but their remains are extremely rare in deposits of Gondwana, (nowadays the southern continents). Nevertheless, the existence of fragmentary remains and trackways in the deposits of Gondwana indicate the presence of eurypodan taxa there. Adratiklit is the first described eurypodan taxon from North Africa, as well as—along with Thyreosaurus—one of the oldest known stegosaurs (being similar in age to Bashanosaurus, Isaberrysaura, and the informally-named "Ferganastegos").

== Discovery and naming ==
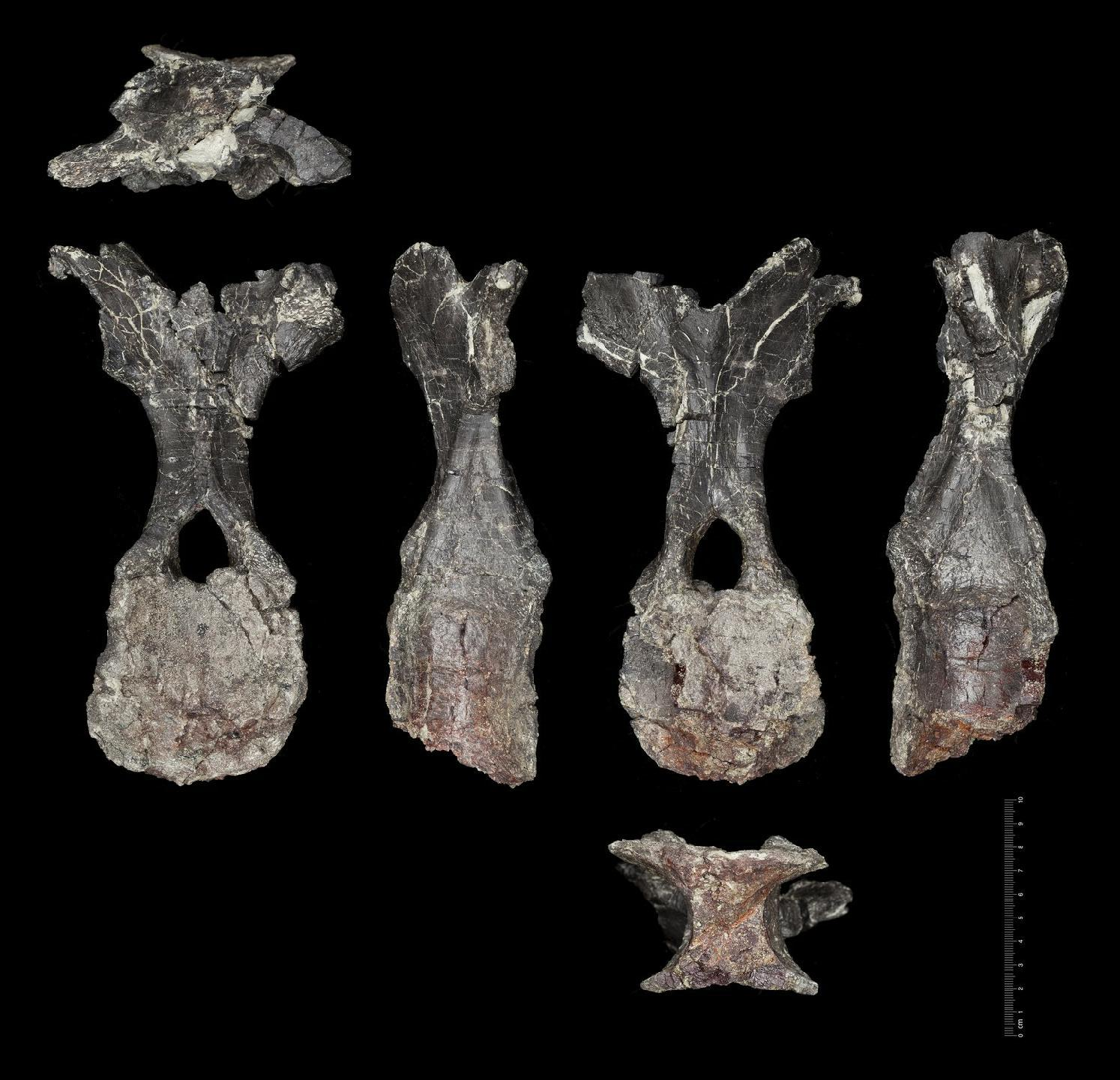
Holotype specimen

Adratiklit boulahfa was described by Susannah Maidment, Thomas J. Raven, Driss Ouarhache, and Paul M. Barrett on 16 August 2019 in an article published online in the paleontological journal Gondwana Research; the article was published physically in January 2020. The holotype of Adratiklit boulahfa is a dorsal vertebra, NHMUK PV R37366. Referred specimens include three cervical vertebrae (NHMUK PV R37367 and NHMUK R37368, the latter specimen consisting of a series of two articulated bones), a dorsal vertebra (NHMUK PV R37365), and a left humerus (NHMUK PV R37007). The specimens were acquired by the Natural History Museum in the United Kingdom from fossil traders. They represent multiple individuals, probably five. While the second dorsal vertebra shares traits with the holotype, the other referrals are merely based on the fact that the material is stegosaurian. An attempt in 2018 to locate the site did not produce any relevant fossils but clarified the region's geology.

The generic name Adratiklit is derived from the Berber words "adrar", meaning "mountain", and "tiklit", meaning lizard. The specific name, boulahfa, refers to the area of Boulahfa near where the specimen was said to be found.

== Description ==
Estimated size of Adratiklit compared to a human

While the holotype for Adratiklit only includes a dorsal vertebra, a few other remains are known, including an upper arm bone and additional vertebrae. The fossilized humerus is 61 cm (24 in) long. Adratiklit has an estimated body length of up to 7 metres (23 ft).

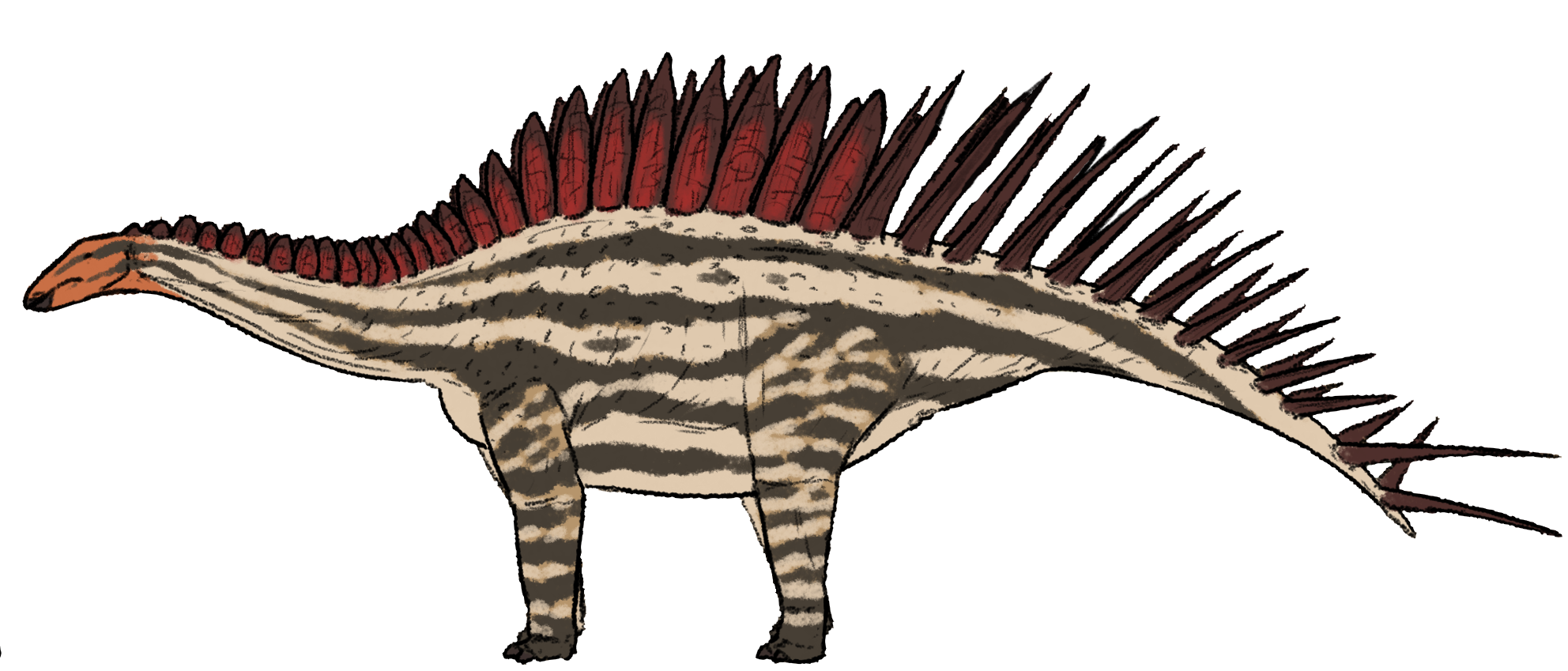
Speculative life restoration

The describers established two autapomorphies, or unique derived traits. With the dorsal vertebrae, the prezygapophysis has a small triangular rough protrusion on top, behind the front articulation facet of the vertebral body. With the dorsal vertebrae, the centroparapophysal laminae being drawn on the anteriorly-projecting rugosities that are located on either side of the neural canal in dorsal vertebrae, the ridges between the vertebral body and the parapophyses, the contact facets for the lower rib heads, end in rough areas protruding to the front on both sides of the front opening of the neural canal. These traits are unique for the Stegosauria as a whole and are diagnostic to this taxon.

== Classification ==
Based on their phylogenetic results, Maidment et al. (2020) identified Adratiklit as more closely related to the European stegosaurs Dacentrurus and Miragaia in the subfamily Dacentrurinae than to the southern African taxa Kentrosaurus and Paranthodon. These results are displayed in the cladogram below:

- Stegosauridae
  - - Alcovasaurus
    - Paranthodon
    - Tuojiangosaurus
  - - Kentrosaurus
    - - - Adratiklit
        - - Dacentrurus
          - Miragaia
      - - Jiangjunosaurus
        - Hesperosaurus
        - - Loricatosaurus
          - Stegosaurus

== See also ==
- Timeline of stegosaur research
