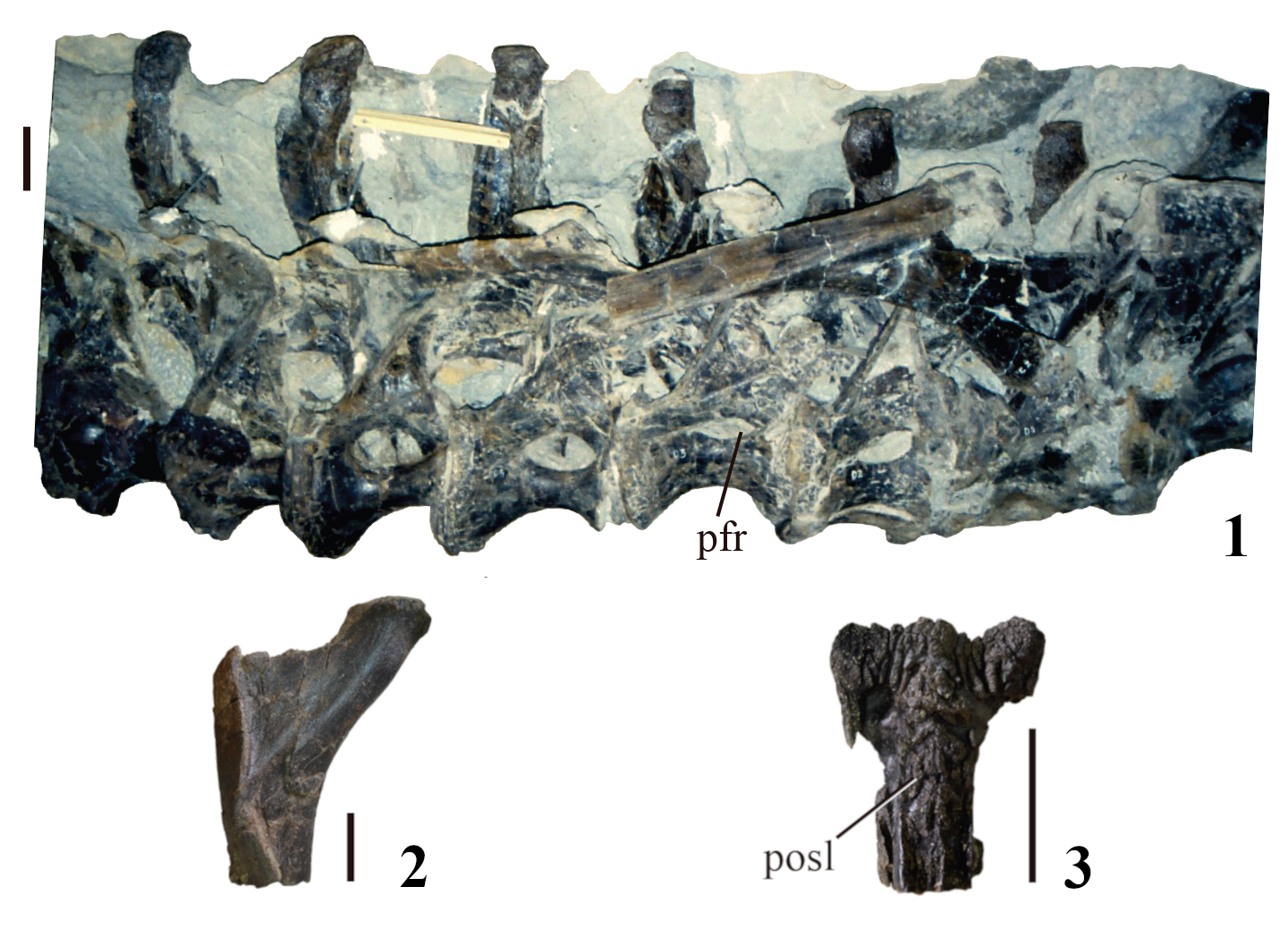
- Articulated dorsal vertebrae in right view (1) proximal end of a dorsal rib in anterior view (2), and anterior caudal neural spine in posterior view (3).

Scientific classification
- Kingdom: Animalia
- Phylum: Chordata
- Class: Reptilia
- Clade: Dinosauria
- Clade: Saurischia
- Clade: †Sauropodomorpha
- Clade: †Sauropoda
- Superfamily: †Diplodocoidea
- Family: †Diplodocidae
- Genus: †Dinheirosaurus; Bonaparte & Mateus, 1999
- Species: †D. lourinhanensis

Binomial name
- †Dinheirosaurus lourinhanensis Bonaparte & Mateus, 1999

Synonyms
- Supersaurus lourinhanensis? (Bonaparte & Mateus, 1999)

= Dinheirosaurus =

Dinheirosaurus Temporal range: Late Jurassic, early Tithonian

Genus of reptiles (fossil)

Dinheirosaurus is a genus of diplodocid sauropod dinosaur that is known from fossils uncovered in modern-day Portugal. It may represent a species of Supersaurus. The only species is Dinheirosaurus lourinhanensis, first described by José Bonaparte and Octávio Mateus in 1999 for vertebrae and some other material from the Lourinhã Formation. Although the precise age of the formation is not known, it can be dated around the early Tithonian of the Late Jurassic.

The known material includes two cervical vertebrae, nine dorsal vertebrae, a few ribs, a fragment of a pubis, and many gastroliths. Of the material, only the vertebrae are diagnostic, with the ribs and pubis being too fragmentary or general to distinguish Dinheirosaurus. This material was first described as in the genus Lourinhasaurus, but differences were noticed and in 1999 Bonaparte and Mateus redescribed the material under the new binomial Dinheirosaurus lourinhanensis. Another specimen, ML 418, thought to be Dinheirosaurus, is now known to be from another Portuguese diplodocid. This means that Dinheirosaurus lived alongside many theropods, sauropods, thyreophorans and ornithopods, as well as at least one other diplodocid.

Dinheirosaurus is a diplodocid, a relative of Apatosaurus, Diplodocus, Barosaurus, Supersaurus, and Tornieria. Among those, the closest relative to Dinheirosaurus is Supersaurus.

== Discovery and naming ==
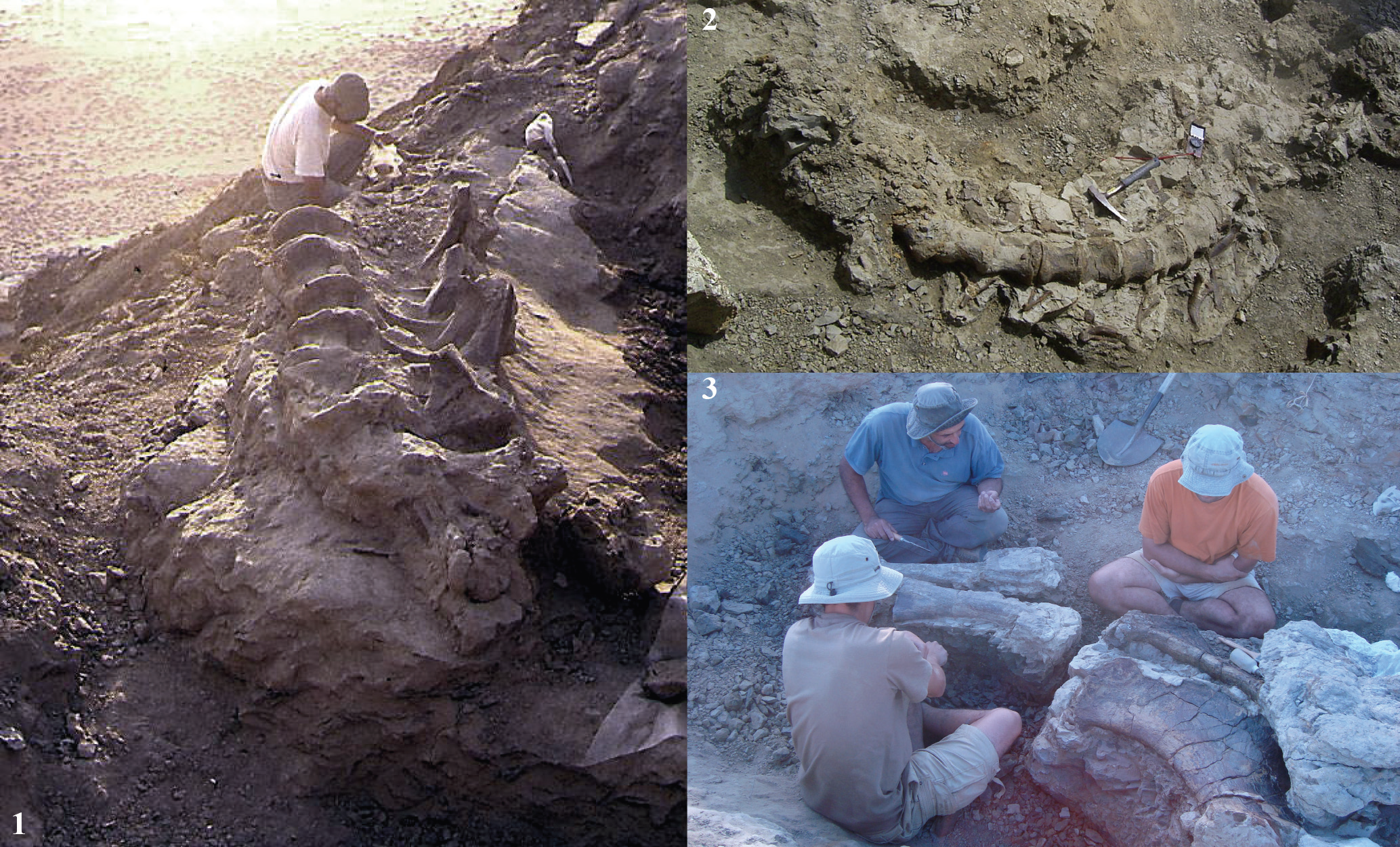
Dorsal series (ML 414) in Porto Dinheiro with the palaeontologist Pedro Dantas in 1991 (Left). A partial skeleton in the field (SHN 534) collected in Santa Rita, including a partial tail, in 2003 (top right). And several appendicular bones, in 2009 (bottom right).

ML 414 was first uncovered in 1987 by Mr. Carlos Anunciação. He was associated with the Museu da Lourinhã, and after the excavations which lasted from the time of discovery until 1992, the specimen was then moved into the museum, and catalogued under the number 414. Dantas et al. preliminarily announced ML 414 as soon as the excavations were complete. To remove the fossils from the surrounding rock, a bulldozer and tilt hammer were needed. The fossils were situated at the top of a coastal cliff, and once removed, were shipped to Lourinhã in two blocks with the help of a crane. A year before being described as a new taxon, Dantas et al. assigned ML 414 to Lourinhasaurus alenquerensis, previously grouped under Apatosaurus. José Bonaparte and Octávio Mateus studied the material of Lourinhasaurus, concluding one specimen, under the name ML 414, to be more closely related to diplodocids of the Morrison Formation, and thus warranting a new binomial name. This new species was described as Dinheirosaurus lourinhanensis, with a full meaning of "Porto Dinheiro lizard from Lourinhã".

Dinheirosaurus material included vertebrae, ribs, partial pelvis, and gastroliths. The vertebrae were certainly from the cervical and dorsal regions, and are articulated. The two cervicals are not greatly preserved, although the twelve dorsals are articulated and in good condition. Other vertebral material includes seven centra that are fragmentary and a few neural arches, which are unattached. 12 dorsal ribs are preserved, as well as some appendicular elements. David Weishampel et al. did not recognize all the material as belonging to Dinheirosaurus, and only found 9 dorsals in the holotype, while also misinterpreting the pubis as a limb fragment. They also incorrectly stated that it was found in the Camadas de Alcobaça Formation. Another pair of vertebrae, under collection number ML 418, was originally assigned to Dinheirosaurus by Bonaparte and Mateus, but is now considered to be a distinct new unnamed genus of diplodocid.

== Description ==
Size comparison

Dinheirosaurus was an average sized diplodocid, and had an elongated neck and tail. The main features of the genus are based on its vertebral anatomy, and multiple vertebrae from across the spine have been found. In total, Dinheirosaurus would have had an approximate length of 20–25 metres (66–82 ft) and weighed 8.8 metric tons (9.7 short tons). A giant footprint was found in the same locality as Dinheirosaurus. At 1.05 metres (41 in) in length it was considered as possibly coming from Dinheirosaurus and might indicate this genus could attain giant sizes.

The animal is not known well from non-vertebral material, currently only consisting of partial ribs and a fragment of a pelvis. One of the ribs attached to the cervicals, and is quite fragmentary. It is elongated, although that might be a feature of distortion. Also undescribed by Bonaparte & Mateus are a set of thoracic ribs. Two ribs are from the left side of the animal. They are T-shaped in cross section, and display plesiomorphic features, although their incomplete state makes their identification uncertain. Multiple right ribs are preserved, including both the shafts and heads. They are similar to the left ribs, which also show that they lack pneumatization. Other appendicular (non-vertebral) material includes a very incomplete and fragmentary shaft of the pubis, and over one hundred gastroliths. The pubis displays practically no anatomical features, and the gastroliths were not described in detail by Mannion et al. in 2012.

=== Vertebrae ===
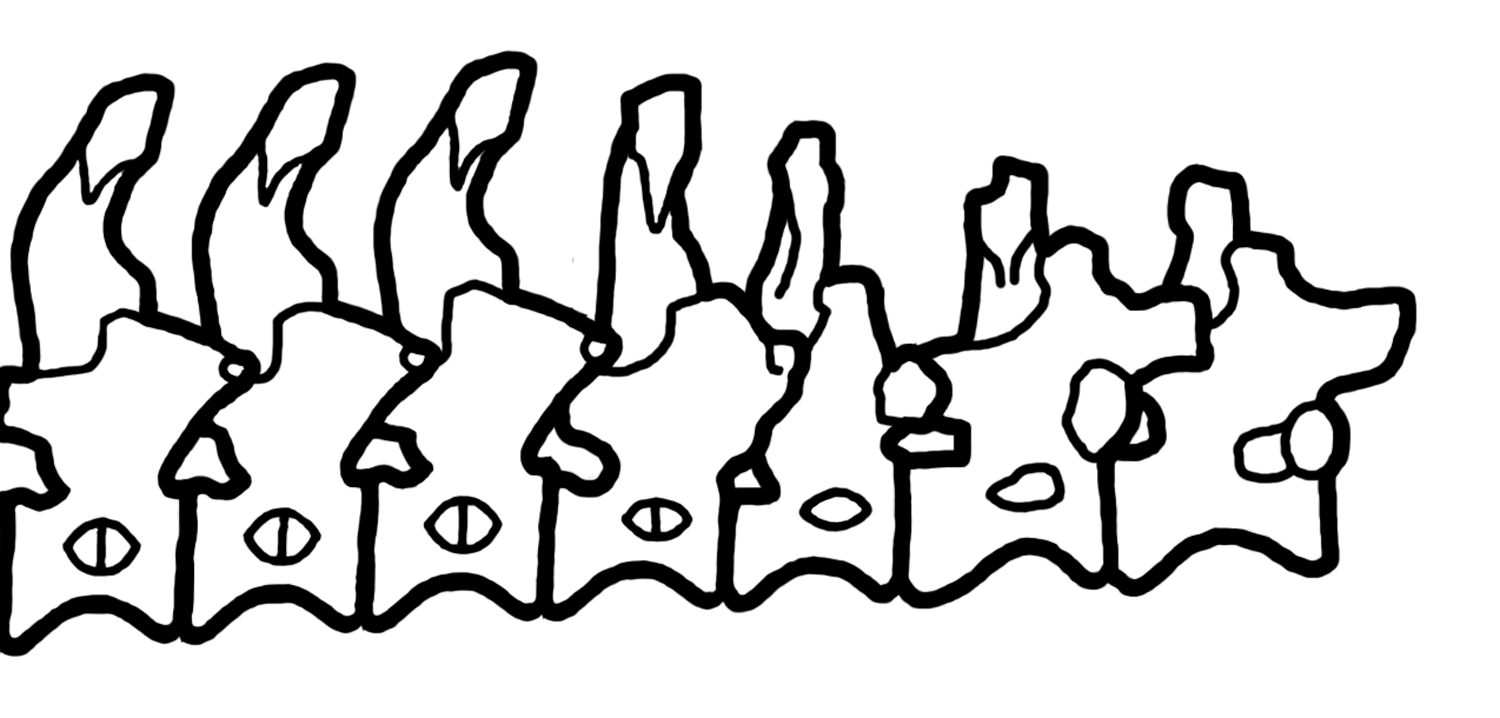
3rd to 9th dorsal vertebrae

The most distinguishing material of Dinheirosaurus comes from the vertebrae, which are well represented and described. Of the cervicals, only two of the assumed fifteen are preserved. According to Bonaparte & Mateus (1999), the cervicals would number 13 and 14. Apparently cervical 15 was lost during the excavation and removal of the holotype and only specimen of Dinheirosaurus. As of the original description, the thirteenth cervical was only prepared on the lateroventral portion. The length of the centrum is 71 cm (28 in), and the fourteenth cervical is quite similar overall. 63 cm (25 in) is the total measurement of the 14th cervical's centrum, which is well-preserved, complete, and concave along the bottom edge. The neural spine, while compressed from above compared to the cervicals of Diplodocus, is massive, and projects upwards towards its posterior end.

A relatively complete series of dorsal vertebrae are known, which number one to seven. All of the dorsals, however, are distorted upwards due to their state of preservation. Bonaparte & Mateus (1999) noted that the position of the dorsals was not certain, and that in fact the first dorsal could have been the last cervical or even the second dorsal. A similar numbering was found in Diplodocus, with the first and second dorsals similar in anatomy to the last and second-last cervical. The dorsal vary in length from the 58 cm (23 in) of the first dorsal to the 25 cm (9.8 in) of the seventh, eight and ninth dorsals. Height in the vertebrae is also quite variable, with the shortest height being 51 cm (20 in) tall to 76 cm (30 in) tall, increasing from the first dorsal.

== Classification ==
Dinheirosaurus is not extremely well known, and as a consequence, its phylogenetic position is not certain. In 2012 during a redescription of the taxon by Philip Mannion et al., it was recovered, in both cladograms, to be sister species to Supersaurus vivianae and together forming the most basal diplodocines. A 2012 cladogram, published by Mannion et al. and using a modified matrix of Whitlock (2011) found that Dinheirosaurus was more primitive than Torneria and more derived than Apatosaurus. However, a cladogram from 2014 found that their group was supported, but in fact more primitive than Apatosaurus, and therefore outside Diplodocinae. In 2015, Dinheirosaurus lourinhanensis was considered a species of Supersaurus in a new combination S. lourinhanensis; their results are shown below. However, to either confirm or refute this hypothesis, several remains of the holotype need to be prepared.

- Diplodocidae
  - Amphicoelias altus
  - - Apatosaurinae
      - Unnamed species
      - - - Apatosaurus ajax
          - Apatosaurus louisae
        - - Brontosaurus excelsus
          - - Brontosaurus yahnahpin
            - Brontosaurus parvus
    - Diplodocinae
      - Unnamed species
      - - Tornieria africana
        - - - Supersaurus (=Dinheirosaurus) lourinhanensis
            - Supersaurus vivianae
          - - Leinkupal laticauda
            - - Galeamopus hayi
              - - - Diplodocus carnegii
                  - Diplodocus hallorum
                - - Kaatedocus siberi
                  - Barosaurus lentus

Previously, Dinheirosaurus was classified within a Diplodocidae excluding Apatosaurus, for the differences anatomically are quite great. Bonaparte & Mateus found that a few features present suggested that Dinheirosaurus was more derived than Diplodocus, but plesiomorphic features also present conclude that they branched separately and Dinheirosaurus is not the descendant of Diplodocus. A 2004 study by Upchurch et al. found that Dinheirosaurus was an intermediate diplodocoid, along with Cetiosauriscus, Amphicoelias, and Losillasaurus.

== Paleobiology ==
As a diplodocid, it is probable that Dinheirosaurus possessed a whip-tail. If it did, it has been speculated that its tail could have been used like a bullwhip, with supersonic speed or, more recently, as a tactile organ to keep in touch with other members of a group. Being related to both Apatosaurus and Diplodocus, Dinheirosaurus probably possessed a squared snout. This means that it was probably a non-selective ground-feeding sauropod.

=== Digestion ===
Dinheirosaurus is one of relatively few sauropods for which gastroliths were found obviously alongside the type specimen. In 2007, an experiment using Dinheirosaurus, Diplodocus (=Seismosaurus), and Cedarosaurus tested if sauropods used their gastroliths in an avian-style gastric mill. The analysis took into account that among the hundreds of sauropods found, gastroliths are only known from a few associated specimens. Authors chose to use the three sauropods with the most associated gastroliths, Dinheirosaurus, Diplodocus, and Cedarosaurus, because of the large amount of gastroliths found in birds. When birds were typically found to have 1.05% of their body weight gastroliths, the sauropod Diplodocus, which had the highest amount of gastroliths, only amassed to 0.03% body weight. This means that since the other sauropods Dinheirosaurus and Cedarosaurus had less gastroliths to body mass, an avian-style gastric mill is unlikely to have evolved in sauropods, and they instead might have used gastroliths to absorb minerals.

== Paleoecology ==
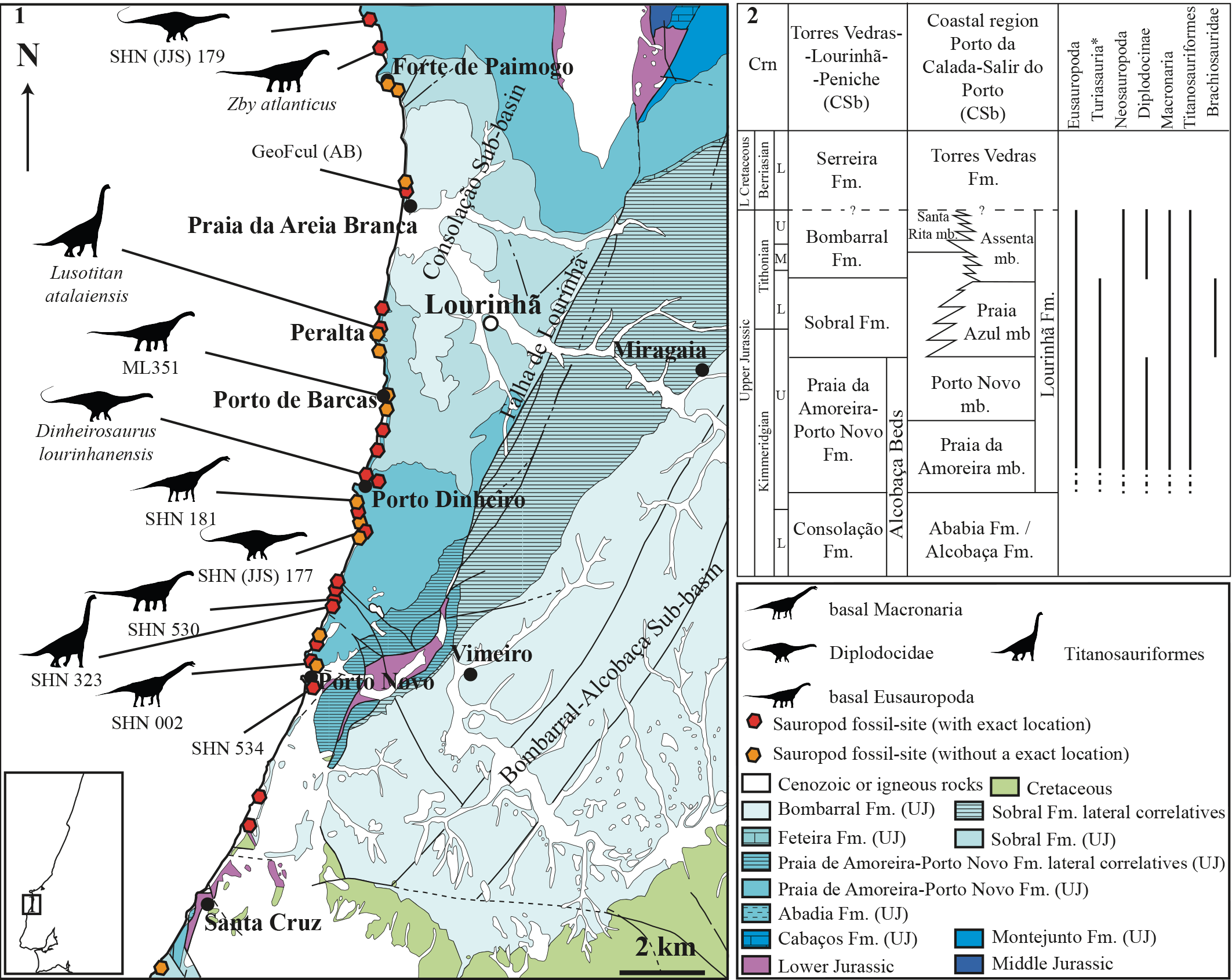
Geological map of Praia da Consolação-Lourinhã-Torres Vedras, showing the locations where sauropod fossils have been discovered. (Dinheirosaurus appears in the center)

Dinheirosaurus was one of many dinosaurs to have lived in the Lourinhã Formation during the Late Jurassic. Many theropods, sauropods, and especially ornithischians are also from the Lourinhã Formation, which contains a similar fauna to the North American Morrison Formation. Many theropods are known including an unnamed genus of abelisaurid; the allosaurid Allosaurus fragilis; the ceratosaurid Ceratosaurus; the coelurosaurians Aviatyrannis jurassica, and cf. Richardoestesia; an intermediate theropod; and the megalosaurid Torvosaurus gurneyi. Sauropods are less common, with only an intermediate diplodocid as well as Dinheirosaurus; the camarasaurid Lourinhasaurus alenquerensis; the turiasaur Zby atlanticus; and the brachiosaurid Lusotitan known. Ornithischians are well represented, with identified remains persisting to Trimucrodon cuneatus; Alocodon kuehnei; the stegosaurians Dacentrurus armatus, Miragaia longicollum, and Stegosaurus ungulatus; the ankylosaurid Dracopelta zbyszewskii; the ornithopods Draconyx loureiroi, Camptosaurus sp., Phyllodon henkelli, and cf. Dryosaurus sp.

=== Biogeography ===
Many eusauropods, including Dinheirosaurus have been found in the Late Jurassic of Europe. The sauropods are from around the base of the Tithonian as based on the presence of Anchispirocyclina lusitanica. One sauropod, a diplodocid currently based on an unnamed specimen including vertebrae and some bones, is clearly different from Dinheirosaurus and Losillasaurus, confirming the presence of a least two and possibly more diplodocids in the Late Jurassic of Spain and Portugal. This is unique in the variety of diplodocoids in all Europe, with the only other genera possibly non-diplodocoid (Cetiosauriscus), or classified in Rebbachisauridae. This suggests that the biogeography of primitive sauropods is incomplete, with possible primitive eusauropods and diplodocids surviving in the Late Jurassic, potentially until the Berriasian.
