= Trimucrodon =

Trimucrodon Temporal range: Late Jurassic, Kimmeridgian

Scientific classification
- Domain: Eukaryota
- Kingdom: Animalia
- Phylum: Chordata
- Clade: Dinosauria
- Clade: †Ornithischia
- Genus: †Trimucrodon; Thulborn, 1973
- Species: †T. cuneatus

Binomial name
- †Trimucrodon cuneatus Thulborn, 1973

Genus of dinosaurs

Trimucrodon is a genus of ornithischian dinosaur from the Late Jurassic Lourinhã Formation of Portugal. The type, and currently only, species is T. cuneatus.

== Discovery and naming ==
Three isolated teeth found at the Porto Dinheiro (or Pinhiero) locality in the Lisboa District of Portugal were given the name in 1973 by Richard A. Thulborn, derived from the Latin words for "three" and a dagger point, tri- and mucro, and the Ancient Greek word ὀδούς for "tooth". The only species in the taxon is Trimucrodon cuneatus, taken from the wedge shape of the teeth. Though the unit the specimens came from was originally unnamed, it was referred to the Alcobaça, and then Lourinhã Formations, specifically the late Kimmeridgian Amoreira–Porto Novo Member. The type specimen, uncovered between 1962 and 1967 by German zoologist and paleontologist Georg Krusat, is distinguished by prominent denticles at the front and rear ends of the crown, and comes from an individual under 2 m (6.6 ft) long. It is currently kept in the collections of the Museu Geológico do Instituto Geológico e Mineiro in Lisbon, Portugal, formerly having been kept in the collections of the Free University of Berlin.

== Description ==
The holotype tooth of Trimucrodon is 4.4 mm (0.17 in) wide, similar to some of the referred specimens, with the crown about as tall as wide. Other specimens have crowns as small as 1.5 mm (0.059 in) wide and only half as tall as wide. The crowns are of varying amounts of asymmetry, though each edge bears the same number of tapering denticles. Tooth enamel is present of an equal thickness on both sides of the tooth crown, and both faces are smooth without ridges. The denticles increase in size away from the apex of the crown, ending with two widely divergent and sharply-pointed denticles at the front and rear ends of the base.

== Classification ==
Trimucrodon was originally referred to as a member of the ornithopod family Fabrosauridae by Thulborn in 1973, closest to Echinodon but also related to Alocodon and Fabrosaurus. Peter M. Galton retained it in the family in 1978, though he noted that there were significant differences between Trimucrodon and Echinodon, and the Middle to Late Jurassic fabrosaurids Alocodon, Trimucrodon and Echinodon were representative of three independent and only distantly related branches of the family, with Nanosaurus not preserving enough material to determine its relationships. Given that the species was only represented by teeth, Trimucrodon was designated as a nomen dubium in 1990 by David B. Weishampel and Lawrence M. Witmer, as an indeterminate member of Ornithischia outside Ornithopoda. While a basal ornithischian position outside Ornithopoda was retained by Paul Sereno in 1991, it was considered a possibly valid taxon based on its prominent anterior and posteriormost denticles. Galton revised his classification of the taxon in 1994, considering it only referrable to Ornithopoda, and not closely related to Echinodon. Trimucrodon was then compared favourable by Galton in 1996 to the also Portuguese taxon Taveirosaurus, previously considered a pachycephalosaur. With the later reclassifications of Taveirosaurus as more similar to nodosaurids, Trimucrodon was identified by José Ruiz-Omeñaca in 1999 to either be a member of Heterodontosauridae alongside Echinodon, or a member of Nodosauridae related to Taveirosaurus. While the identity as a possible heterodontosaurid was upheld by Ruiz-Omeñaca and José Canudo in 2004, in the same year Weishampel, Witmer and colleague David B. Norman followed their 1990 opinion on Trimucrodon, placing it as a dubious ornithischian, though they noted that further study could potentially support the validity of the taxon.

== Paleoecology ==
Trimucrodon was found at the top of a cliff south of Porto Dinheiro, in the lower beds of the Lournihã Formation alongside a tooth referred to the ornithischian Hypsilophodon, teeth from rhamphorhynchoid pterosaurs, the crocodylomorphs Lusitanisuchus and Goniopholis, the choristoderan Cteniogenys, the lizard Saurillus, and over 800 teeth of various groups of mammals. Other deposits from the Amoreira–Porto Novo Member at Porto Dinheiro have contained material from the sauropods Zby and Dinheirosaurus, the theropods Lourinhanosaurus, Torvosaurus and Ceratosaurus, ornithischian remains from the stegosaur Miragaia and an intermediate member of Iguanodontia, a possible pleurosternid turtle, and scales from the fish Lepidotes.
