= Lourinhã Formation =

Late Jurassic geological formation in Portugal

- Stratigraphic range: Kimmeridgian-Tithonian; ~152.5–146.5 Ma
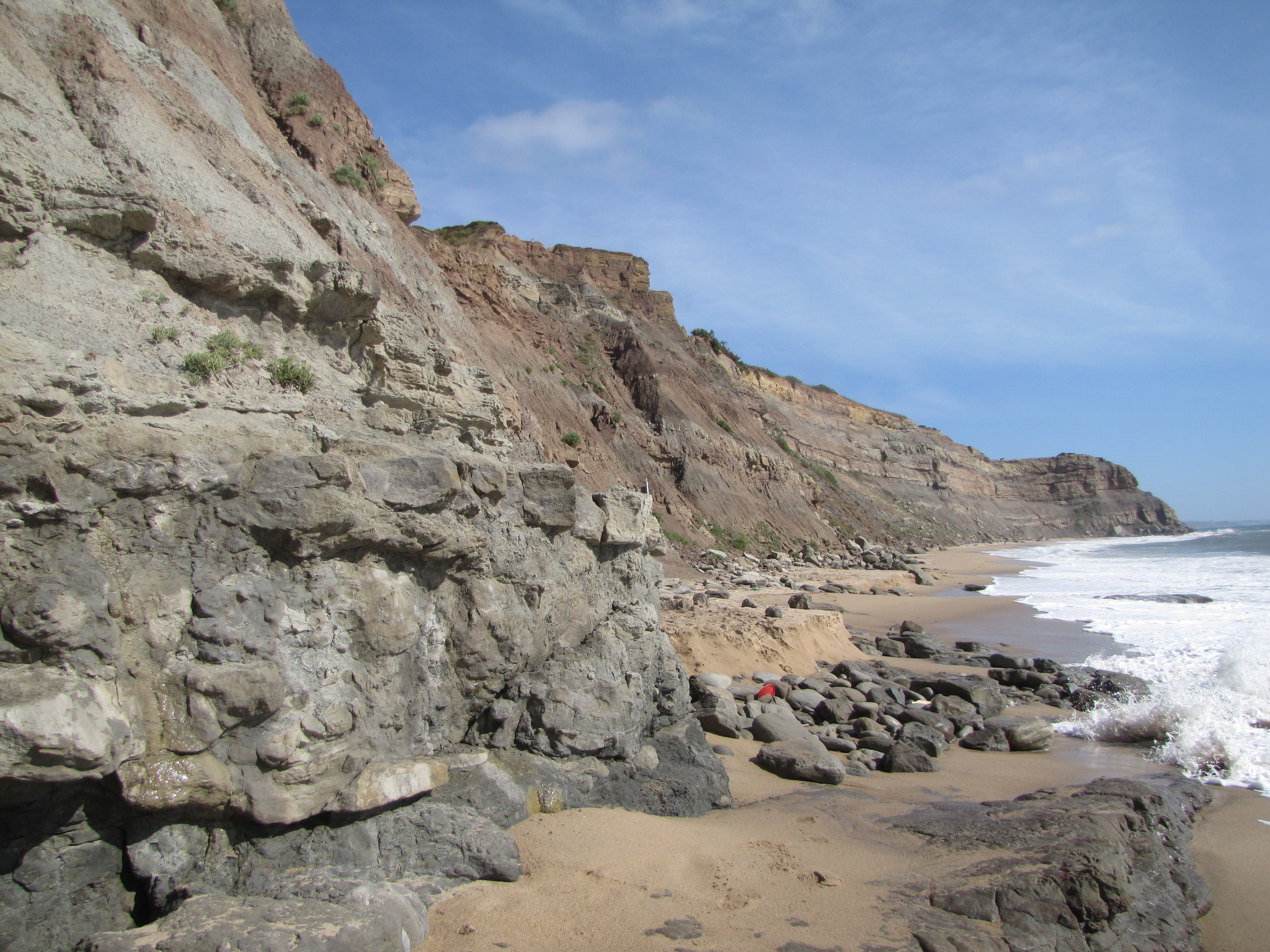
- Type: Geological formation
- Sub-units: Consolação Sub-Basin – Praia da Amoreira-Porto Novo Member, Praia Azul Member, Santa Rita Member; Turcifal Sub-Basin – Assenta Member
- Underlies: Porto da Calada Formation
- Overlies: Consolação and Alcobaça formations
- Thickness: 200–1,100 metres (660–3,610 ft)

Lithology
- Primary: Sandstone, mudstone, marl
- Other: Conglomerate, limestone

Location
- Coordinates: 39.23°N 9.32°W
- Region: Lisbon Region
- Country: Portugal
- Extent: Lusitanian Basin

Type section
- Named for: Lourinhã
- Named by: Hill
- Year defined: 1988
- Lourinhã Formation (Portugal)

The Lourinhã Formation (Portuguese pronunciation: [loɾiˈɲɐ̃]) is a fossil-rich geological formation in western Portugal, named for the municipality of Lourinhã. The formation is mostly Late Jurassic in age (Kimmeridgian/Tithonian). It is notable for containing a fauna especially similar to that of the Morrison Formation in the United States and to a lesser extent to the Tendaguru Formation in Tanzania. There are also similarities to the nearby Villar del Arzobispo Formation and Alcobaça Formation. Besides the fossil bones, Lourinhã Formation is also well known for the fossil tracks and fossilized dinosaur eggs.

The Lourinhã Formation includes several lithostratigraphic units, such as Praia da Amoreira-Porto Novo Members, Praia Azul Member, the Santa Rita Member, and the Assenta Member. The stratigraphy of the formation is complex and controversial, with the constituent member beds belonging to the formation varying between different authors.

== Lithology and depositional history ==
=== Depositional history ===
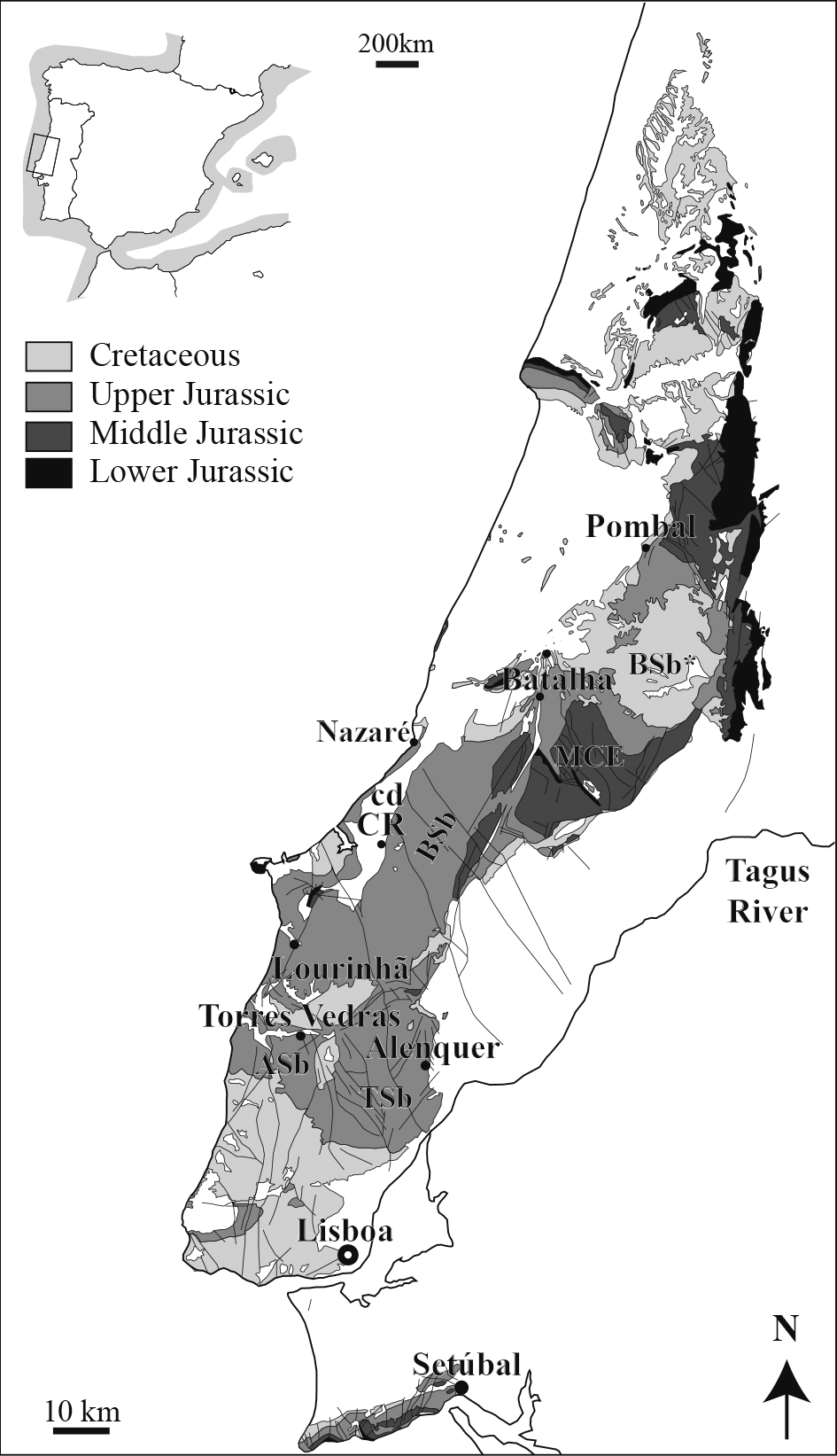
Location of the Lusitanian basin within the Iberian Peninsula

The Lourinhã Formation is located within the Lusitanian Basin, a mostly onshore North South orientated rift basin within western Portugal, formed during the Opening of the North Atlantic Ocean, with sediment deposition beginning during the Late Triassic-Early Jurassic. It primarily consists of syn-rift near-coastal continental siliciclastic sediments, with several marine intercalations. The primary flow direction was North to South, originating from Galicia and flowing between the Iberian landmass to the east and the now largely submerged Berlengas horst, a north–south oriented ridge, to the west. The Lourinhã Formation is regarded as being coeval with the younger parts of the Morrison Formation.

The Lourinhã Formation is interpreted as being an island, separated from North America and the rest of Europe by marine barriers. The paleoclimate is interpreted as being semi arid, with less than 50 cm (20 in) of annual precipitation and an average annual temperature of 16–19 °C. It is interpreted as having a variety of different habitats, including deltas, coastal plains, and open woodlands. Some of the units and sub-basins of the Lourinhã Formation may have been deposited coevally, despite some distinctions in preserved palaeoenvironments.

=== Stratigraphy ===
The unit was first formally proposed by Hill in 1988.

The stratigraphy of the Lourinhã Formation is complex and varies between sub-basins with several competing stratigraphic proposals, and there is currently no consensus on the matter. One of the most recent stratigraphies divides the formation into three members, from oldest to youngest: the Praia da Amoreira-Porto Novo Member, Praia Azul Member, and the Assenta Member.

The age of the Lourinhã Formation has been regarded as Kimmeridgian to Tithonian. The age of the overlying Alcobaça Formation has been determined to be 152.5 Ma at the point of contact with Lourinhã. The overlying and intefingering Freixial Formation has been dated through magnetostratigraphy to 150.8 to 146.5 mya. Therefore, the age of the Lourinhã Formation is between 152.5 and 146.5 mya. The Alcobaça Formation has been regarded as Pro parte with the Lourinhã Formation, meaning they are partially time equivalent.

==== Praia da Amoreira-Porto Novo Member ====
The Praia da Amoreira-Porto Novo Member is composed of the Praia de Amoreira Member, which consists of massive mudrock-sand with metre-thick sandstone lenses, with massive mudrock with calcrete. The overlying Porto Novo Mb. consists of massive bodies of sandstone, often cross bedded. The environment of deposition is interpreted as a meandering fluvial system, while the Porto Novo Mb is interpreted as a deltaic deposit. It is interpreted to be latest Kimmeridgian in age, and overlies the Consolacao Unit at the top of the Aulacostephanus eudoxus ammonite zone. The continental facies of the Porto Novo Member intersperse into the Praia Azul Member and transition vertically and laterally into each other. At Vale Pombas at least 2 tongues of the Porto Novo Member are interspersed with 2 tongues of the Praia Azul Member. At Porto Dinheiro, the continental fluvial environment at the top of Porto Novo Member shows tidal influence, possible evidence of interaction with the coastal ecosystem of the Praia Azul Member. In the region from Paimogo to Areia Branca the overlaying deposits of the Praia Azul Member correspond to the upper Porto Novo Member in that section, implying they intercalate. These details indicate the Praia Azul and Porto Novo members represent laterally equivalent environments deposited simultaneously in adjacent, shifting, and laterally migrating sedimentary environments.

==== Praia Azul Member ====
The Praia Azul Member, formerly known as the Sobral unit/member, is 80–130 m (260–430 ft) thick and consists of tabular marls and mudstones, with rare sandstone bodies. There are three distinct laterally extensive (>20 km (12 mi)) thin shelly carbonate horizons within this member, indicating brief marine transgressions. South of Santa Cruz primarily consists of sandstone with rare conglomerate. The age is considered to be latest Kimmeridgian to earliest Tithonian, correlated to the ammonite zones of Hybonoticeras beckeri and Hybonoticeras hybonotum.

==== Santa Rita and Assenta members ====
The Santa Rita Member in the Consolação sub-basin and its lateral equivalent in the Turcifal Basin, the Assenta Member, is around 300 m (980 ft) thick and predominantly consists of mudstones with frequent layers of caliche. Near the top of the member, several layers of tens of metres thick nodular and marly bioclastic limestones are present, containing marine benthic forams. The nodularity is derived from intense Thalassinoides burrowing. It was originally interpreted as being Tithonian in age, but reinterpretation of the magnetostraitgraphic data now places it in the Upper Kimmeridgian to Lower Tithonian. The environment of deposition is interpreted as being an upper fluvial-dominated delta to meandering fluvial systems flowing on a paralic plain. The Assenta Member is thought to represent the upper delta-plain and fluvial domain of the Praia Azul Member.

== Fauna ==
=== Dinosaurs ===
In a 2003 study, an analysis of all Portuguese dinosaurs was published. The study created a cladogram showing the possible relations of all Portuguese dinosaurs, including those at the time known from the Lourinhã Formation.

- Dinosauria
  - Ornithischia
    - Thyreophora
      - Lusitanosaurus
      - Eurypoda
        - Dacentrurus
        - Dracopelta
    - Ornithopoda
      - "Fabrosaurids"
        - Alocodon
        - Trimucrodon
        - Taveirosaurus
      - Euornithopoda
        - Hypsilophodontidae
          - Hypsilophodon
          - Phyllodon
        - Ankylopollexia
          - Dryosaurus
          - - Draconyx
            - Camptosaurus
  - Saurischia
    - Sauropoda
      - Dinheirosaurus
      - Macronaria
        - Lourinhasaurus
        - - Pleurocoelus
          - Lusotitan
    - Theropoda
      - Ceratosaurus
      - Tetanurae
        - Torvosaurus
        - - Lourinhanosaurus
          - - Allosaurus
            - Coelurosauria
              - Compsognathus
              - - Stokesosaurus
                - Maniraptora
                  - Richardoestesia
                  - - - Euronychodon
                      - Paronychodon
                    - Aves

==== Ornithischia ====
Color key: Taxon / Reclassified taxon / Taxon falsely reported as present / Dubious taxon or junior synonym / Ichnotaxon / Ootaxon / Morphotaxon

Notes
Uncertain or tentative taxa are in small text
~~crossed out~~ taxa are discredited.

===== Ornithopods =====
| Genus | Species | Member | Material | Notes | Images |
|---|---|---|---|---|---|
| Ankylopollexia indet. | Indeterminate | Praia Azul Member; Santa Rita Member; Praia de Armoreia-Porto Novo member | Appendicular, axial, and cranial elements | The remains from Porto Novo pertain to a large ankylopollexian. Some of the material was previously referred to Uteodon. The dorsal vertebrae and scapula from Praia Azul are larger than most ankylopollexian material from Lourinhã, similar in size to Camptosaurus sp. | |
| Camptosaurus | Intermediate | | Limb material | Now referred to its own genus, Draconyx, along with some other material. | |
| Draconyx | D. loureiroi | Praia Azul Member | A partial skeleton including teeth, caudal vertebrae, a chevron, a partial forelimb, and a partial right hindlimb | An ankylopollexian | |
| Dryosauridae indet. | Indeterminate | Praia Azul Member Praia da Amoreira-Porto Novo Member | Appendicular, axial, and cranial elements | Various remains of indeterminate dryosaurids. | |
| Eousdryosaurus | E. nanohallucis | Praia Azul Member | A partial postcranial skeleton. | A basal iguanodontian ornithopod. | |
| Hesperonyx | H. martinhotomasorum | Porto Novo Member | Bones from the forelimbs and hindlimbs | A dryomorphan iguanodontian with uncertain affinities | |
| Ornithopoda indet. | Intermediate | Praia Azul Member | A single track | Giant track of an ornithopod suggestive of an animal with a hip height of 2.8–3 metres (9.2–9.8 ft).No known Jurassic ornithopod reaches this size. Found alongside the Deltapodus print. | |
| Phyllodon | P. henkelli. | | Two teeth | | |

Color key: Taxon / Reclassified taxon / Taxon falsely reported as present / Dubious taxon or junior synonym / Ichnotaxon / Ootaxon / Morphotaxon

Notes
Uncertain or tentative taxa are in small text
~~crossed out~~ taxa are discredited.

===== Thyreophorans =====
| Genus | Species | Member | Material | Notes | Images |
|---|---|---|---|---|---|
| Dacentrurus | D. sp. | Santa Rita Member; Praia Azul Member; Praia de Armoreia-Porto Novo Member | A specimen consists of a collection of skeletal remains consisting of a nearly complete dorsal vertebra, three dorsal vertebral centra, nine dorsal neural arch fragments, an incomplete sacrum that preserves only four sacral vertebrae, two sacral ribs, fragments of the dorsal sacral plate, the anterior process of the right pubis, and numerous fragmentary remains belonging to the dermal armor, in addition to several indeterminate fragments. | A stegosaurid; material referred to Miragaia may belong to this taxon. Fossils from Lourinhã come from a particularly large animal. Maidment et al. regard the material of Dacentrurus from Lourinhã as diagnostic to the genus level. | Dacentrurus armatus |
| Deltapodus | D. brodricki | | Eleven tracks; Nine pes and two manus prints. | The tracks can be separated into three different morphologies. However, all fall within the range of the ornithopod association of the pes and manus tracks to the same taxon, cannot be directly supported. Preserve various well-preserved skin impressions. The largest prints are larger than those from the type horizon. The tracks are individually represented and do not form any sort of trackway, though one print is associated with a giant ornithopod track, potentially representing that the creatures were traveling together or were otherwise going to a similar location. Another is similarly associated with theropod and sauropod prints. | |
| Dracopelta | D. zbyszewskii | Assenta Member | | An ankylosaur. | |
| Miragaia | M. longicollum | Praia da Armoreira Porto Novo Member; Santa Rita Member; Praia Azul Member | Holotype, neck, partial skull, forelimbs, ribs. Tentative juvenile specimen assigned to this taxon. | A stegosaur with an unusually long neck of 17 cervicals, with more neck vertebrae than most sauropods. Probably a junior synonym of Dacentrurus. | |
| Stegosaurus | S. cf. ungulatus | | Partial skeleton | It was discovered in the Casal Novo locality which was originally interpreted as coming from the Alcobaça Formation, but recent studies reassign the locality to the Lourinhã Formation. Specimen is regarded as referable to Stegosaurus, with characters particularly relating it to S. ungulatus, notably the posterior edge of the neural arch sloping posteriorly on the anterior cervical vertebrae and bifurcated apices of the anterior caudal neural arches. | |

Color key: Taxon / Reclassified taxon / Taxon falsely reported as present / Dubious taxon or junior synonym / Ichnotaxon / Ootaxon / Morphotaxon

Notes
Uncertain or tentative taxa are in small text
~~crossed out~~ taxa are discredited.

===== Other ornithischians =====
| Genus | Species | Member | Material | Notes | Images |
|---|---|---|---|---|---|
| Alocodon | A. kuehnei | | | | |
| Trimucrodon | T. cuneatus | Amoreira-Porto Novo Member | Three isolated teeth | | |

==== Saurischia ====
Color key: Taxon / Reclassified taxon / Taxon falsely reported as present / Dubious taxon or junior synonym / Ichnotaxon / Ootaxon / Morphotaxon

Notes
Uncertain or tentative taxa are in small text
~~crossed out~~ taxa are discredited.

===== Sauropods =====
| Genus | Species | Member | Material | Notes | Images |
|---|---|---|---|---|---|
| Dinheirosaurus | D. lourinhanensis | Praia da Amoreira-Porta Novo Member Praia Azul Member | One specimen. Vertebrae; potentially other parts of the body. | A diplodocid. Tschopp et al. (2015) sunk the genus into Supersaurus. Found at the top of the Porto Novo Member. | |
| Diplodocidae indet. | Intermediate | Praia da Amoreira-Porto Novo Member Praia Azul Member | Variety of skeletal remains | Remains of various indeterminate diplodocid specimens. | |
| cf. Diplodocus sp. | Indeterminate | Praia da Amoreira-Porto Novo Member | Two partial specimens | Represented by 2 partial skeletons,SHN 177 and 178. Remains long considered to be from an animal closely related to Diplodocus and recently suggested to be a potential representative of this genus. SHN 178 comes from the Freixial Formation. | |
| Flagellicaudata indet. | Indeterminate | Praia Azul Member | Teeth; ML 2784 | Teeth from an indeterminate flagellicaudatan, possibly a diplodocid. The tooth from the Praia Azul Member has a dental morphology similar to that reported from juvenile diplodocines. | |
| Lourinhasaurus | L. alenquerensis | Praia Azul Member Praia de Armoreia-Porto Novo Member | A partial postcranial skeleton | Possibly a camarasaurid macronarian. Possible specimens include SHN 002 from the Praia de Armoreia-Porto Novo Member. | |
| Lusotitan | L. atalaiensis | Praia Azul Member Praia de Armoreia-Porto Novo Member | Fragmentary material | A large brachiosaurid; a close relative of Brachiosaurus | |
| Oceanotitan | O. dantasi | Praia da Amoreira-Porta Novo Member | scapula, almost all of the pelvis, a complete leg sans the toes, and nine caudals. | A titanosauriform | |
| Sauropoda indet. | Indeterminate | Praia da Amoreira-Porta Novo Member | Footprints | Large footprints, possibly from a brachiosaurid or diplodocid | |
| Turiasauria indet. | Indeterminate | Praia Azul Member Praia da Amoreira-Porto Novo Member | Teeth | Teeth referred to indeterminate turiasaurs. Possibly from Zby. | |
| Zby | Z. atlanticus | Amoreira-Porto Novo Member | Tooth, cervical neutral arch, forelimb, various other fragments | A turiasaur | |
| Losillasaurus | L. giganteus | Amoreira-Porto Novo Member | Caudal Vertebrae | A giant turiasaur. | |

===== Theropods =====
| Genus | Species | Member | Material | Notes | Images |
|---|---|---|---|---|---|
| Abelisauridae indet. | Intermediate | Praia da Amoreira-Porto Novo Member | Teeth; ML 966, Ml 327. | Potentially diagnostic abelisaur teeth but these may represent allosauroid teeth instead. | |
| Allosaurus | A. fragilis | Praia Azul Member Praia da Amoreira-Porto Novo Member | Two specimens, covering much of the body. | Once regarded as a European species of Allosaurus, A.europaeus. However,later studies regarded it as a synonym of A. fragilis. | |
| Ceratosaurus | C. sp. | Praia da Amoreira-Porto Novo Member Praia Azul Member | Four specimens; teeth, a femur. | Potentially a synonym of the type species, C. nasicornis. Sometimes referred to as C. sp., giving indication of possible distinctiveness or of being intermediate. Remains also known from the Praia Azul Member. Remains come from Porto das Barcas, considered part of the Sobral Fm/Praia Azul Member. | Ceratosaurus nasicornis |
| Dendroolithidae indet. | Indeterminate | | Fragments of multiple eggs in a clutch, with associated embryonic remains. | Probably eggs of Torvosaurus. | |
| Dromaeosauridae? indet. | Indeterminate | Praia Azul Member | Teeth | Teeth pertaining to a possible dromaeosaur. | |
| Elaphrosaurinae indet. | Indeterminate | Praia da Armoreia de-Porto Novo Member | ML 2050; skeletal remains | An indeterminate elaphrosaurine closely related to Elaphrosaurus. | |
| Lourinhanosaurus | L. antunesi | Praia Azul Member | Three individuals, one largely complete; over 100 eggs with significant amount of skeletal material. | Has come out in various places in the tree, erroneously said to be a megalosaur, mostly accepted to be a carnosaur, probably allosauroid, or basal coelurosaur. Currently unstable on the tree. | |
| Carcharodontosauria Indet. | Indeterminate | Praia Azul Member | A femur,ML 555 | Regarded as having features consistent with being a carcharodontosaurian. Possibly Lusovenator, but this requires further study. | |
| Lusovenator | L. santosi | Praia de Amoreira Member | A partial postcranial skeleton | Earliest known carcharodontosaurian from Laurasia; also known from the Freixial Formation. | |
| Megalosauroidea indet. | Indeterminate | Praia da Armoreia de-Porto Novo Member Praia Azul Member | Teeth | Interpreted as being a non-megalosaurid megalosauroid, potentially related to Marshosaurus. | |
| Megalosaurus | M. insignis | | Teeth. | Invalid. Teeth belong to various other theropod taxa. | |
| Megalosaurus | M. pombali | | Teeth. | Invalid. Teeth belong to various other theropod taxa | |
| Megalosaurus | M. sp. | | Tooth fragment. | Invalid; Dubious. | |
| Richardoestesia | R. aff. gilmorei | | Tooth; ML 939 | Only definite record of this taxon is from the Late Cretaceous of North America, despite erroneous and referrals from other sites in Portugal. Probably a close relative of Richardoestesia and not an actual representation of the taxon. | |
| Torvosaurus | T. tanneri | Praia da Amoreira-Porto Novo Member; Praia Azul Member | Maxilla, Teeth, Femur; Egg clutch and embryos. | Largest known European theropod. Previously regarded as a distinct species, T.gurneyi. Synonymized with T. tanneri. | Torvosaurus tanneri |
| Tyrannosauroidea indet. | Indeterminate | Praia da Armoreia de-Porto Novo Member Praia Azul Member | Teeth | Teeth referred to an Indeterminate tyrannosauroid. | |

=== Pterosaurs ===
| Genus | Species | Member | Material | Notes | Images |
|---|---|---|---|---|---|
| Dsungaripteroidea indet. | Indeterminate | Praia da Amoreira-Porto Novo Member | Proximal right femur | A very large femur of a basal dsungaripteroid | |
| Rhamphorhynchidae indet. | Indeterminate | | Tooth | | |
| Lusognathus | L. almadrava | Praia Azul Member | Skull and cervical vertebrae | A Ctenochasmatid pterosaur | |
| Pteraichnus | | | Partial tracks | | |

=== Mammaliaformes ===
==== Docodonta ====
| Genus | Species | Member | Material | Notes |
|---|---|---|---|---|
| Haldanodon | H. expectatus | | Partial skeleton and isolated bones | Semi-aquatic docodont |

==== Cladotheria ====
| Genus | Species | Member | Material | Notes |
|---|---|---|---|---|
| Drescheratherium | D. acutum | | Upper jaw. | Paurodontidae; herbivore. |
| Guimarotodus | G. inflatus | | Right mandible. | Dryolestidae; insectivore or omnivore. |
| Krebsotherium | K. lusitanicum | | Left mandible. | Dryolestidae; insectivore or omnivore. |
| Nanolestes | N. drescherae | | Right lower molar. | Amphitheriidae; small omnivore or insectivore. |

==== Multituberculata ====
| Genus | Species | Member | Material | Notes |
|---|---|---|---|---|
| Kuehneodon | K. hahni | | | A member of the family Paulchoffatiidae |

=== Amphibians ===
| Genus | Species | Member | Material | Notes |
|---|---|---|---|---|
| Celtedens | C. sp. | Porto Novo/Praia da Amoreira, Praia Azul | Frontal bones, along with other parts of the skull and limbs | An albanerpetontid |
| "Discoglossidae" indet. | Indeterminate | | Partial left humerus | A primitive frog |
| Nabia | civiscientrix | Porto Novo/Praia da Amoreira, Praia Azul. | 468 bones including skull, vertebral, and limb elements. | An albanerpetontid |
| Urodela indet. | Indeterminate | | Atlas vertebra | A salamander, suggested to belong to Scapherpetontidae. |

=== Squamates ===
| Genus | Species | Member | Material | Notes |
|---|---|---|---|---|
| Paramacellodidae | Indeterminate | | Frontal and dentary bones | Scincomorph lizard |

=== Crocodyliformes ===
| Genus | Species | Member | Material | Notes | Images |
|---|---|---|---|---|---|
| Atoposauridae indet. | Indeterminate | | Partial skull table and braincase Teeth | | |
| Bernissartiidae indet. | Indeterminate | | Tooth | | |
| Goniopholididae indet. | Indeterminate | | Teeth and partial skeleton. | An aquatic neosuchian | |
| Lusitanisuchus | L. mitracostatus | | Teeth, and partial skull and jaw fragments | A mesoeucrocodylian of uncertain placement | |
| Machimosaurus | M. hugii | Praia Azul Member | Isolated teeth | A large thalattosuchian crocodylomorph. Widespread, only found in the Praia Azul Member due to the area's marine deposits. | |
| Mesoeucrocodylia indet. | Indeterminate | | Teeth | Distinct from Lusitanisuchus | |
| Ophiussasuchus | O. paimogonectes | Praia Azul Member | Partial skull | Goniopholidid | |

=== Plesiosauria ===
| Genus | Species | Member | Material | Notes |
|---|---|---|---|---|
| Plesiosauria indet. | Indeterminate | | Vertebra (ML813) | |

=== Fish ===
| Genus | Species | Member | Material | Notes |
|---|---|---|---|---|
| Caturus | C. sp. | | | An amiiform |
| Hybodus | H. cf. reticulatus | | Teeth | A hybodontid shark |
| Lepidotes sensu lato | L. s. l. | | Teeth | A ginglymodian |
| Pycnodontiformes indet. | Indeterminate | | Teeth | |

== Flora ==
| Genus | Species | Member | Material | Notes | Images |
|---|---|---|---|---|---|
| Classopollis | | | | Pollen of Cheirolepidiaceae conifers | |
| Cupressinocladus | | | | Conifer leaves | |
| Protocupressinoxylon | | | | Conifer wood | |
| Prototaxoxylon | | | | Conifer wood | |
| Pterophyllum | P. mondeguensis | | | Bennettitales leaf | |
| Otozamites | | | | Bennettitales leaf | |

== Correlation ==
Early Cretaceous stratigraphy of Iberia
| Ma | Age | Paleomap \ Basins | Cantabrian | Olanyà | Cameros | Maestrazgo | Oliete | Galve | Morella | South Iberian | Pre-betic | Lusitanian |
|---|---|---|---|---|---|---|---|---|---|---|---|---|
| 100 | Cenomanian | | La Cabana | Sopeira | Utrillas | | Mosquerela | | | | | Caranguejeira |
| 100 | Cenomanian | | Altamira | Sopeira | Utrillas | | | | | | | Caranguejeira |
| 100 | Cenomanian | | Eguino | Sopeira | Utrillas | | | | | | | Caranguejeira |
| 125 | Albian | | Ullaga - Balmaseda | Lluçà | Utrillas | | | | | Traiguera | | Caranguejeira |
| 125 | Albian | | Monte Grande | Lluçà | Escucha | | Escucha | | | Jijona | | Caranguejeira |
| 125 | Albian | | Itxina - Miono | Lluçà | Escucha | | Escucha | | | | | Caranguejeira |
| 125 | Aptian | | Valmaseda - Tellamendi | Lluçà | Ol Gp. - Castrillo | Benassal | Escucha | Benassal | | | | Olhos |
| 125 | Aptian | | Valmaseda - Tellamendi | Font | En Gp. - Leza | Morella/Oliete | Oliete | Villaroya | Morella | Capas; Rojas | | Almargem |
| 125 | Aptian | | Patrocinio - Ernaga | Senyús | En Gp. - Jubela | Forcall | | | Morella | Villaroya | Upper; Bedoulian | Figueira |
| 125 | Barremian | | Vega de Pas | Cabó | Abejar | Xert | Alacón | Xert | Morella | Huérguina | Upper; Bedoulian | Assises |
| 125 | Barremian | | Vega de Pas | Prada | Abejar | Artoles | | | Morella | Collado | Moutonianum | Papo Seco |
| 125 | Barremian | | Vega de Pas | Rúbies | Tera Gp. - Golmayo | Alacón/Blesa | Blesa | Camarillas | Mirambel | Collado | Moutonianum | Papo Seco |
| 150 | Hauterivian | | Vega de Pas | Rúbies | Ur Gp. - Pinilla | Llacova | Blesa | Castellar | Tera Gp. - Pinilla | Villares | | Porto da Calada |
| 150 | Hauterivian | | Vega de Pas | Rúbies | Ur Gp. - Pinilla | Llacova | hiatus | Castellar | | Villares | | Porto da Calada |
| 150 | Hauterivian | | Vega de Pas | Rúbies | Ur Gp. - Pinilla | Huerva | hiatus | Castellar | Gaita | | | Porto da Calada |
| 150 | Valanginian | | Villaro | Rúbies | Ur Gp. - Larriba | Huerva | hiatus | Castellar | Ped Gp. - Hortigüela | | | Porto da Calada |
| 150 | Valanginian | | Villaro | Rúbies | Ped Gp. - Hortigüela | Huerva | hiatus | Castellar | Ped Gp. - Piedrahita | | | Porto da Calada |
| 150 | Valanginian | | Villaro | Rúbies | Peñacoba | Huerva | hiatus | Galve | Ped Gp. - Piedrahita | Miravetes | | Porto da Calada |
| 150 | Berriasian | | Cab Gp. - Arcera | Rúbies | Valdeprado | hiatus | hiatus | Alfambra | Ped Gp. - Piedrahita | Miravetes | | Porto da Calada |
| 150 | Berriasian | | Cab Gp. - Arcera | | TdL Gp. - Rupelo | hiatus | hiatus | Arzobispo | hiatus | Tollo | | Porto da Calada |
| 150 | Berriasian | | Cab Gp. - Arcera | | On Gp. - Huérteles; Sierra Matute | hiatus | hiatus | Arzobispo | hiatus | Tollo | | Porto da Calada |
| 150 | Tithonian | | Lastres | | Tera Gp. - Magaña | hiatus | Higuereles | | hiatus | Tera Gp. - Magaña | | Lourinhã |
| 150 | Tithonian | | Lastres | | Tera Gp. - Magaña | hiatus | Higuereles | | Arzobispo | Tera Gp. - Magaña | | Lourinhã |
| 150 | Tithonian | | Lastres | | Ágreda | hiatus | Higuereles | | Arzobispo | Tera Gp. - Magaña | | Lourinhã |
| Legend | | Major fossiliferous, oofossiliferous, ichnofossiliferous, coproliferous, minor formation | | | | | | | | | | |

== See also ==
- Camadas de Alcobaça
- Camadas de Guimarota
- List of fossil sites
- Museu da Lourinhã
- List of dinosaur bearing rock formations
