= Freixial Formation =

Geologic formation in Portugal

- Stratigraphic range: Tithonian150.8–146.5 Ma

The Freixial Formation is a Late Jurassic geologic formation with outcrops in central Portugal. The formation has produced the fossils of many vertebrates, including non-avian dinosaurs. It was deposited during the Tithonian age of the Late Jurassic.

== Stratigraphy and paleoenviroment ==
Outcrops of the Freixial Formation are located in the Lusitanian Basin of Central Portugal. It is considered to represent the youngest Jurassic rocks in the region, and it overlies the more well-known Lourinhã Formation. The depositional environment is interpreted as comprising deltaic and distal fluvial environments. The formation was deposited during the Tithonian age, spanning around 150.8 to 146.5 million years ago. The thickest outcrops are 150 metres (490 ft) tall. It had once been considered synonymous with the Assenta Member of the Lourinha Formation, but more papers treat the Freixial Formation as a distinct unit. In the south of the basin, it interfingers with rocks of the Lourinha Formation.

== Fossil content ==
| Color key: Taxon / Reclassified taxon / Taxon falsely reported as present / Dubious taxon or junior synonym / Ichnotaxon / Ootaxon / Morphotaxon | Notes; Uncertain or tentative taxa are in small text; ~~crossed out~~ taxa are discredited. |

=== Dinosaurs ===
==== Ornithischians ====
Ornithischians of the Freixial Formation
| Genus | Species | Location | Stratigraphic position | Material | Notes | Image |
|---|---|---|---|---|---|---|
| Dacentrurus | D. armatus | | Tithonian | Skeletal remains | A large dacentrurine stegosaurid | |
| Ankylopollexia indet. | Indeterminate | | Tithonian | Femur | An ankylopollexian ornithopod similar to Camptosaurus. | |
| Dracopelta | D. zbyweski | | Tithonian | Fragmentary remains | An early ankylosaur | |
| Ornithopoda indet. | Indeterminate | | Tithonian | Footprints | Various large and small footprints, with smaller footprints interpreted as coming from a dryosaurid and larger footprints interpreted as coming from large, Camptosaurus-like taxa. | |
| Dryosauridae indet. | Indeterminate | | Tithonian | Skeletal remains | A dryosaurid ornithopod. Remains of indeterminate dryosaurids. | |

==== Sauropods ====
Sauropods of the Freixial Formation
| Genus | Species | Location | Stratigraphic position | Material | Notes | Images |
|---|---|---|---|---|---|---|
| Lusotitan | L. atalaiensis | | Tithonian | Caudal vertebrae | A brachiosaurid sauropod. Freixial material originally regarded by Mannion and colleagues as indeterminate. Thus the Freixial material is referrable to Lusotitan. However Mocho and colleagues noticed depressions on the front of the posterior caudal vertebrate of the Freixial specimen,a diagnostic trait of Lusotitan. | |
| Diplodocinae indet. | Indeterminate | | Tithonian | Variety of material | A diplodocine diplodocid. Various remains of indeterminate diplodocine, including a large (150 cm (59 in)) femur | |
| Camarasauridae indet. | Indeterminate | | Tithonian | Neural spine and partial skeletons | A camasasaurid sauropod. Remains of indeterminate camarasaurids | |
| Turiasauria indet. | Indeterminate | | Tithonian | Teeth | A turiasaur. Teeth attributed to Indeterminate turiasaurians | |

==== Theropods ====
Various theropod teeth from the Freixial Formation have been referred to the genera Allosaurus, Torvosaurus, and Ceratosaurus on the basis of cladistic and multivariate analysis. According to Mateus et al. 2024, a combination of both methods is strong enough to confidently assign teeth on the genus level.

Theropods of the Freixial Formation
| Genus | Species | Location | Stratigraphic position | Material | Notes | Images |
|---|---|---|---|---|---|---|
| Allosaurus | A. sp. | | Tithonian | Teeth | A allosaurine allosaurid | |
| Torvosaurus | T. sp. | | Tithonian | Teeth | A megalosaurine megalosaurid | |
| Ceratosaurus | C. sp. | | Tithonian | Teeth | A ceratosaurid ceratosaur | |
| Lusovenator | L. santosi | | Tithonian | Articulated caudal vertebrae | A carcharodontosaurian theropod | |

=== Turtles ===
Turtles of the Freixial Formation
| Genus | Species | Location | Stratigraphic position | Material | Notes | Images |
|---|---|---|---|---|---|---|
| Hylaeochelys | H. kappa | | Tithonian | | A plesiochelyid thalassochelydian | |
| Plesiochelys | P. sp. | | Tithonian | | A plesiochelyid thalassochelydian | |
| Tropidemys | T. sp. | | Tithonian | | A plesiochelyid thalassochelydian | |

=== Mammals ===
Mammals of the Freixial Formation
| Genus | Species | Location | Stratigraphic position | Material | Notes | Images |
|---|---|---|---|---|---|---|
| Cambelodon | C. torreensis | | Tithonian | Cranial material | A pinheirodontid multituberculate | |
