= Lusitanisuchus =

Lusitanisuchus Temporal range: Late Jurassic-Early Cretaceous, 155–140 Ma

Scientific classification
- Kingdom: Animalia
- Phylum: Chordata
- Class: Reptilia
- Clade: Archosauria
- Clade: Pseudosuchia
- Clade: Crocodylomorpha
- Clade: Mesoeucrocodylia
- Genus: †Lusitanisuchus; Schwarz and Fechner, 2004
- Species: †L. mitracostatus

Binomial name
- †Lusitanisuchus mitracostatus (Seiffert, 1970)

Synonyms
- Lisboasaurus mitracostatus Seiffert, 1970 (type)

Extinct genus of crocodyliform

Lusitanisuchus is an extinct genus of mesoeucrocodylian crocodyliform. Mostly fragmentary fossils have been found from several localities in Portugal and are Late Jurassic and Early Cretaceous in age.

The only species, Lusitanisuchus mitracostatus, was named in 2004 after having previously been described as a species of the genus Lisboasaurus in 1970. L. mitracostatus was originally thought to have been an anguimorph lizard upon its naming in 1970 based on fragmentary jaw remains and isolated teeth found from the Kimmeridgean-age Guimarota Formation in Leiria . The species was later regarded as a nomen dubium by several authors of papers regarding Lisboasaurus due to the incomplete nature of the known remains associated with the species. However, a later reexamination of fossils from the Guimarota Formation had found skull material that included a dentary similar to the one seen in the holotype of L. mitracostatus. These remains, being more complete than those of the holotype, showed that L. mitracostatus was really a crocodylomorph rather than an anguimorph. Furthermore, it was shown to be a genus distinct from Lisboasaurus, which had by then been shown to be a crocodylomorph as well.

Several teeth referable to Lusitanisuchus were also found from Porto Dinheiro, Lourinhã in strata deposited during the Berriasian stage of the Early Cretaceous, extending the temporal range of this taxon by about 15 Ma.

== Paleobiology ==
Lusitanisuchus coexisted with many dinosaurs from the Lusitanian Basin during the Late Jurassic and Early Cretaceous. Dinosaur fossils found from the Guimarota Formation include tyrannosauroids such as Aviatyrannis and Stokesosaurus, the ornithopod Phyllodon, and the small coelurosaur Compsognathus. The Porto Dinheiro locality included dinosaurs such as the diplodocid Dinheirosaurus as well as early mammals such as Portopinheirodon.
