= Octávio Mateus =

Portuguese dinosaur paleontologist and biologist

Octávio Mateus (born 1975) is a Portuguese dinosaur paleontologist and biologist Professor of Paleontology at the Faculdade de Ciências e Tecnologia da Universidade Nova de Lisboa. He graduated in Universidade de Évora and received his PhD at Universidade Nova de Lisboa in 2005. He collaborates with Museu da Lourinhã, known for their dinosaur collection.

His PhD advisor was Miguel Antunes. He is an expert on dinosaurs, particularly Late Jurassic dinosaurs of Portugal, but he has also worked with specimens from Angola, United States, Greenland, China, and Morocco.

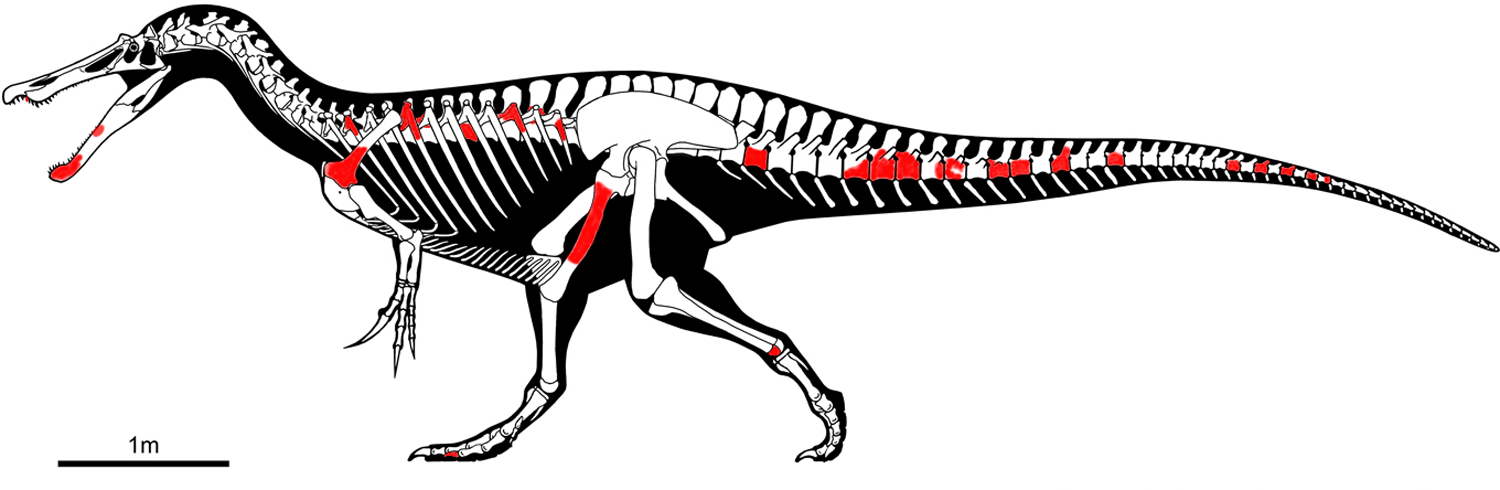
Iberospinus natarioi

New dinosaur taxa he has helped name include Lourinhanosaurus antunesi (1998), Dinheirosaurus lourinhanensis (1999), Tangvayosaurus hoffeti (1999), Draconyx loureiroi (2001), Lusotitan atalaiensis (2003), Europasaurus holgeri (2006), Allosaurus europaeus (2006), Angolatitan adamastor (2011), Torvosaurus gurneyi (2014), Zby atlanticus (2014), Galeamopus (2015), Issi saaneq (2021), and Iberospinus natarioi (2022).

Since 1991, Octávio Mateus has organized dinosaur excavations in Portugal, as well as Laos with the French team of the Paris Museum of Natural History, led by Prof. Philippe Taquet. He has worked in Angola, where he discovered Angolatitan, the first Angolan dinosaur in the scope of a project in the area of vertebrate paleontology of Angola. He collaborates with diverse international scientific institutions as the scientific council member of the German foundation Verein zur Förderung der niedersächsischen Paläontologie. He also studied dinosaur tracks and eggs, phytosaurs, chelonians, and whales. In 2012, he integrated an expedition to the Triassic of Greenland in Jameson Land.

== Controversies ==
In 2023, Mateus was accused of sexual harassment spanning back to 2010.
