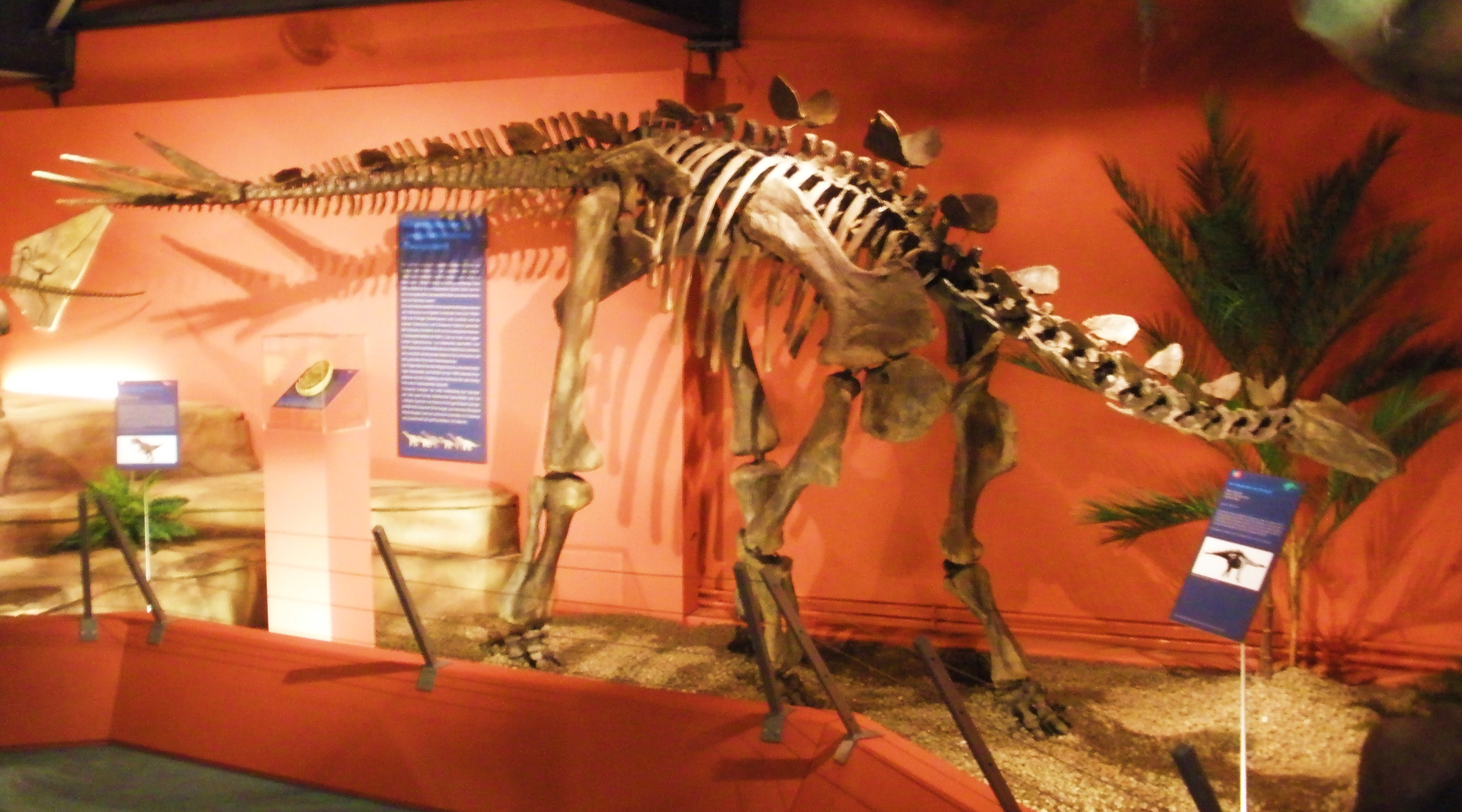
- Skeleton model

Scientific classification
- Kingdom: Animalia
- Phylum: Chordata
- Class: Reptilia
- Clade: Dinosauria
- Clade: †Ornithischia
- Clade: †Thyreophora
- Clade: †Stegosauria
- Family: †Stegosauridae
- Subfamily: †Dacentrurinae
- Genus: †Miragaia; Mateus, Maidment & Christiansen, 2009
- Species: †M. longicollum

Binomial name
- †Miragaia longicollum Mateus, Maidment & Christiansen, 2009

Possible species
- M. longispinus? (Gilmore, 1914) Costa & Mateus, 2019

Synonyms
- Alcovasaurus? Galton & Carpenter, 2016; Natronasaurus? Ulansky, 2014

= Miragaia longicollum =

Miragaia longicollum Temporal range: Late Jurassic, 150 Ma

Extinct species of dinosaur

Miragaia is a genus of long-necked stegosaurid dinosaur. Its fossils have been found in Upper Jurassic rocks in Portugal (Lourinhã Formation, Sobral Unit) and possibly also Wyoming and Utah, United States (Morrison Formation). Miragaia has the longest neck known for any stegosaurian, which included at least seventeen vertebrae. Some researchers consider this taxon to be a junior synonym of Dacentrurus.

== History of discovery ==
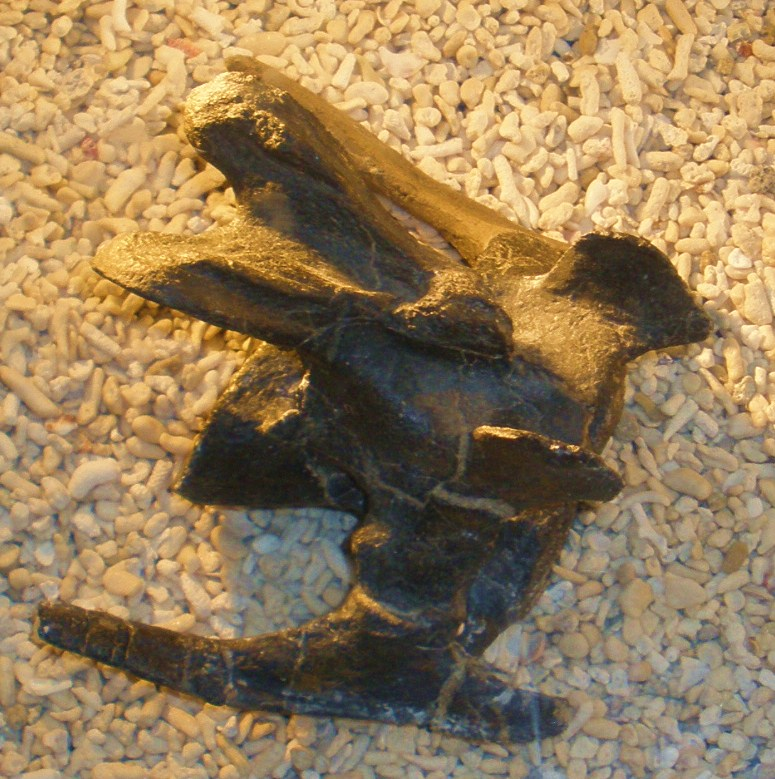
One of the seventeen neck vertebrae, seen from the right upper side

Miragaia is based on holotype ML 433, a nearly complete anterior half of a skeleton with partial skull (the first cranial material for a European stegosaurid). The remains were found after the construction of a road between the villages of Miragaia and Sobral. The rear half of the skeleton was probably destroyed by the roadcut. The fossils were dug up in August 1999 and August 2001. Among the recovered bones were most of the snout, a right postorbital, both angulars of the lower jaws, fifteen neck vertebrae (the first two, which articulated with the skull, were absent), two anterior dorsal vertebrae, twelve ribs, a chevron, the shoulder bones, most of the forelimbs including a possible os carpi intermedium, a right first metacarpal and three first phalanges; and thirteen bony plates plus a spike. The bones were not articulated but dispersed over a surface of about five to seven metres, though there was a partial concentration of fossils that could be salvaged within a single block. ML 433 was found in the Miragaia Unit of the Sobral Unit, Lourinhã Formation, which dates to the late Kimmeridgian-early Tithonian (Late Jurassic, approximately 150 million years ago).

Octávio Mateus, Susannah Maidment and Nicolai Christiansen named and briefly described Miragaia in 2009. The type species is Miragaia longicollum. The generic name refers to the village of Miragaia, in the municipality of Lourinhã, next to which the first specimen was uncovered. The specific name means "long neck" from the Latin longus, "long" and collum, "neck". A partial pelvis (ilium and pubic bone) and two partial dorsal vertebrae from a juvenile individual (specimen ML 433-A) were found at the same location, intermingled with the bones of the holotype, and were also assigned, as a paratype, to M. longicollum. Casts were made of the holotype bones and partially based on these a life-size skeletal model was constructed from polyurethane and polyester resin parts.

In 2026, Francisco Costa described five probable dacentrurine specimens from the Morrison Formation and suggested that four of them are potentially referrable or comparable to Miragaia. UMNH VP 5572 from the Cleveland-Lloyd Dinosaur Quarry (Utah) is assigned to cf. M. longicollum. An unnumbered Griffin Ranch Quarry (Wyoming) specimen housed in Mountain America Museum of Ancient Life, and two specimens from the Cleveland-Lloyd Dinosaur Quarry (Utah), UMNH VP 5732 and YPM PU 14556, are assigned to Miragaia sp.

=== Synonymy with Dacentrurus and Alcovasaurus ===
In 2010, Alberto Cobos and colleagues noted that all the diagnostic characters of Miragaia longicollum are based on skeletal elements that are absent in the Dacentrurus holotype found in England in layers of about the same age, while all traits that can be compared are shared by both genera. Therefore, they proposed that Miragaia is a junior synonym of Dacentrurus, meaning that it is the same dinosaur, because it is not possible to differentiate the two taxa through their holotypes.

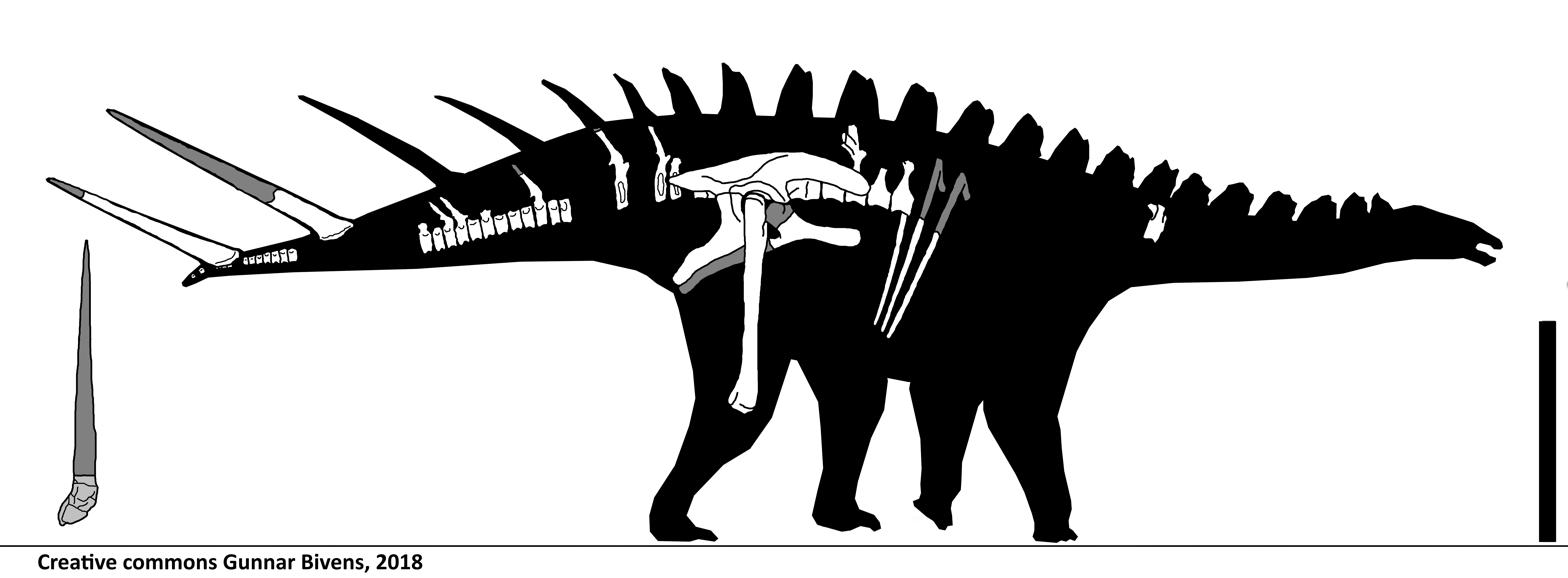
Skeletal reconstruction of the possible species M. longispinus, with known material in white

In 2019, Costa and Mateus argued that Miragaia longicollum is a valid taxon, describing a newly recognised specimen, MG 4863, that had already been excavated in 1959 by Georges Zbyszewski but was only prepared between 2015 and 2017. It consists of a skeleton that also contains tail vertebrae, the most complete dinosaur ever found in Portugal. They also renamed Alcovasaurus, which was discovered in 1908, into a possible second species: Miragaia longispinus. However, Sánchez-Fenollosa et al. (2024) supported the synonymy of Miragaia and Dacentrurus based on a new specimen of the latter from the Villar del Arzobispo Formation, and suggested that Alcovasaurus is a separate genus. In their re-description of the specimen MG 4863, Costa et al. (2025) argued that the two taxa are not synonymous based on comparison with the Dacentrurus holotype and that Alcovasaurus should be included as a second species of Miragaia.

== Description ==
=== Size and diagnosis ===
Size comparison of M. longicollum

Miragaia was long yet relatively lightweight in comparison to other stegosaurs, reaching 6–6.5 metres (20–21 ft) in length and 2 metric tons (2.2 short tons) in body mass. Histology shows that the holotype specimen reached sexual maturity at 14 to 15 years old, and skeletal maturity (full size) between 21 and 25 years old.

The describers established six distinguishing traits. At their very midline, the praemaxillae meet in a small sharp point, set within a larger notch in the snout tip as a whole. The front lower side edge of the praemaxilla protrudes to below. At least seventeen cervical vertebrae are present. The neural spines of the middle cervical vertebrae have a notch at their lower front edge with immediately above it a process directed to the front. The vertebrae of the middle neck, rear neck and front back possess neural spines that have a transversely expanded upper end. On the neck two rows of triangular bony plates are present that have a lightly convex outer side and a notch at the upper front edge creating a hook.

=== Neck elongation ===
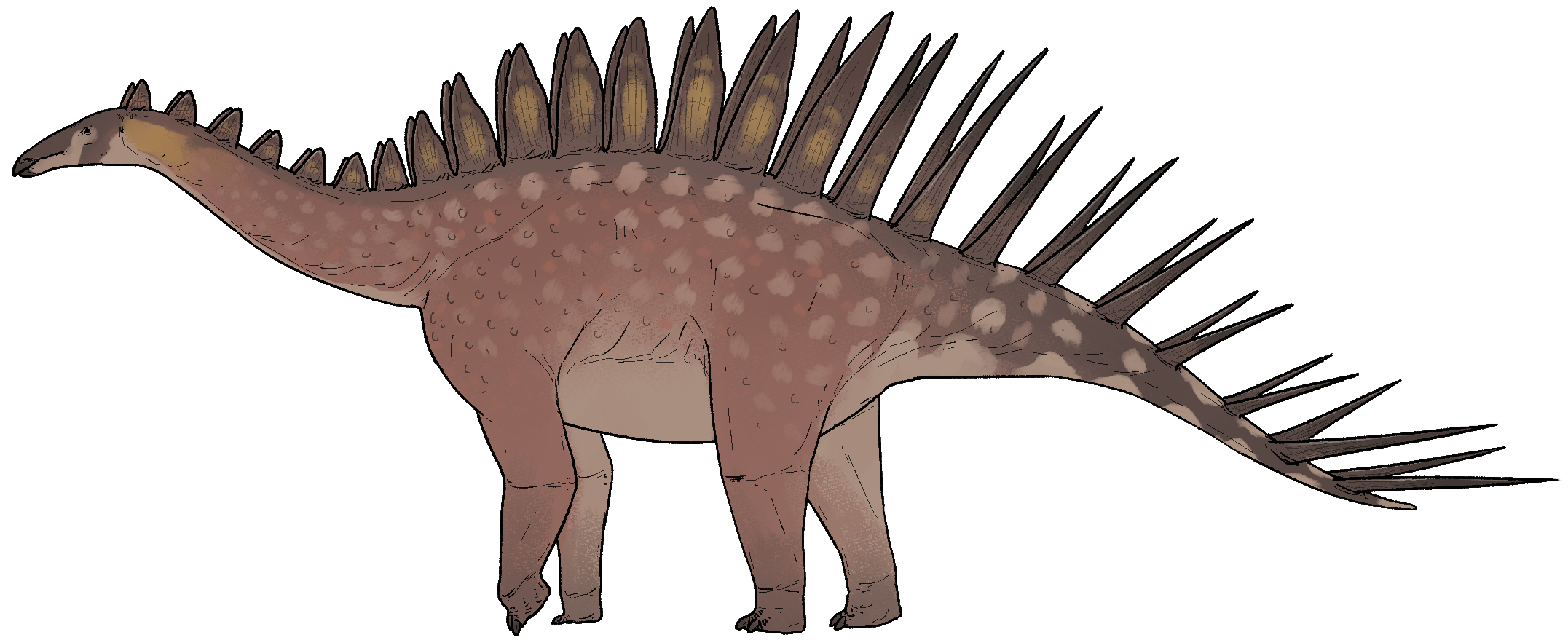
Hypothetical life restoration

The most notable feature of Miragaia is its long neck, which was composed of at least seventeen vertebrae. According to the authors, this represents the culmination of a trend towards longer necks seen in stegosaurians. The Thyreophora, the larger group they belong to, originally seem to have had nine neck vertebrae and this is also the number shown by the basal stegosaurian Huayangosaurus. Later forms like Stegosaurus or Hesperosaurus had twelve or thirteen. Remarkably Miragaia had more neck vertebrae than most sauropods, a different group of dinosaurs famous for their long necks, which contrasts with the traditional view of stegosaurians as low browsers with short necks. Only the Chinese sauropods Euhelopus, Mamenchisaurus and Omeisaurus had as many neck vertebrae as Miragaia, with most sauropods of the Late Jurassic possessing only twelve to fifteen. Mateus and colleagues suggested that the long neck either allowed Miragaia to browse at a level that other herbivores were not exploiting, or that the neck arose due to sexual selection. The possible food gathering function of the neck makes sexual selection a less plausible explanation, but is not in itself entirely convincing: though the contemporary Iberian sauropods Lusotitan, Dinheirosaurus and Turiasaurus were all very large and might not have competed with a medium-height browser, the niche partitioning is still problematic because in Iberia stegosaurian remains have been referred to Dacentrurus and Stegosaurus, which would have possessed a feeding envelope or feeding height stratification overlapping that of Miragaia.

In sauropods, great neck length was achieved by a combination of three processes: incorporation of back vertebrae into the neck; addition of new vertebrae; and lengthening of the individual neck vertebrae. The authors considered whether these mechanisms might have been paralleled in stegosaurians. The long neck of Miragaia appears to have resulted mostly from back vertebrae becoming incorporated into the neck, based on vertebral counts of other stegosaurians. In this group the total number of prescral vertebrae, of the back and neck combined, hardly increased, but there is a clear transformation, dorsal vertebrae of the back becoming "cervicalised" into cervical vertebrae of the neck. Whereas Huayangosaurus still possessed sixteen back vertebrae, this number was reduced to thirteen in Hesperosaurus. There is currently — no count of the number of dorsal vertebrae being possible — no evidence that with Miragaia new vertebrae contributed to the neck; instead, the distribution of existing vertebrae in the back and neck probably changed, about four extra vertebrae becoming cervicals. There is some evidence for increasing vertebral length in Miragaia and Stegosaurus, compared to more basal species, but this is equivocal and could be due to post-mortem distortion; this mechanism was seen as a minor factor in neck elongation.

The authors also discussed the possible underlying genetic mechanisms for such changes. They pointed out that, in contrast with mammals which almost always have seven neck vertebrae due to as much as four hox-genes ensuring a strict partitioning between neck and back, in extant dinosaurs such as the chicken only a single hox-gene regulates this process, seemingly leading to greater evolutionary plasticity.

=== Skeleton ===
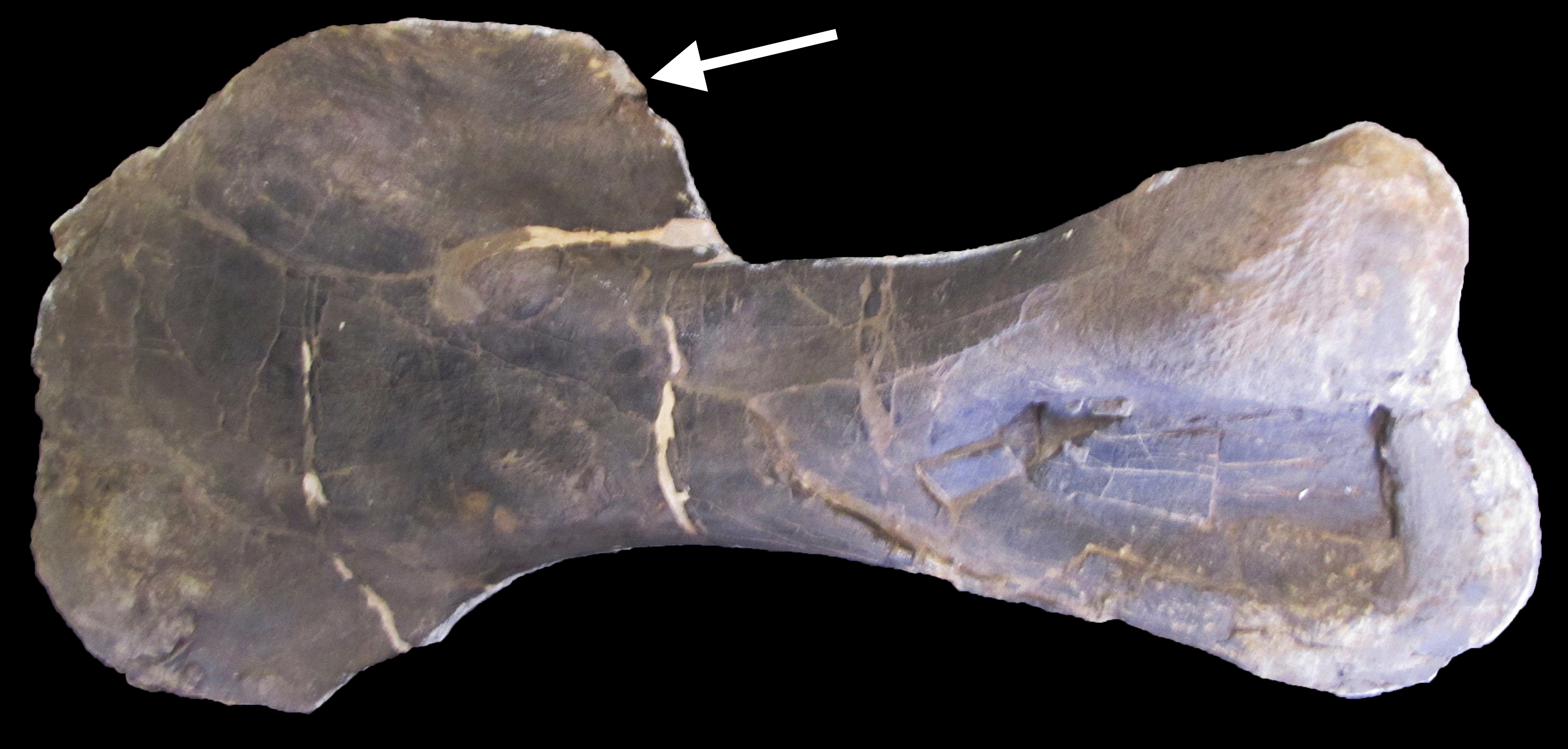
The right humerus, with the arrow indicating the deltopectoral crest

Apart from the neck length, the known osteology of Miragaia resembles that of other stegosaurids, differing in small details. The tip of the beak was toothless, as in Stegosaurus. The upper beak, formed by the praemaxilla, was pendant. The notch in the snout tip was, seen from above, shaped like a W, whereas in Stegosaurus the notch is U-shaped, with a little bulbous projection in the middle. The upper surface of the nasal bone was ornamented. A ridge formed the contact with the maxilla. The maxilla had sixteen teeth. The postorbital was a small and triradiate element.

The cervical vertebrae had well-developed cervical ribs, fused to the vertebral body. The ribs were elongated, with a forward-pointing process on the capitulum, the main rib head. The neural spines of the rear cervicals and front dorsals are transversely expanded at their upper ends due to rugosities serving as an attachment for tendons. This expanded sector projects to the front also, creating a notch on the lower front edge. Additionally the neural spine base is transversely constricted. Ridges extend to the rear from the sides of the neural spine base, over the upper sides of the rear joint processes, the postzygapophyses. These postzygapophyses themselves project far beyond the rear facet of the vertebral body, a derived trait. The prezygapophyses to the contrary, are much shorter; they have a notch at the front upper edge.

The scapula had a large rectangular acromion, with a sharp upper corner, on the lower front edge. The more narrow coracoid had a rounded lower edge. Both the upper arm and ulna and radius (lower arm bones) are also comparable to those of Stegosaurus. The tuberosity of the rear humerus serving as attachment for the musculus triceps brachii is well-developed but the vertical ridge running from it to below is not. In the pelvis, the pubic bone had a deep front part, the processus praepubicus, with a little upward projecting process as seen in Dacentrurus; the rear shaft had a lightly expanded tip.

=== Osteoderms ===
Miragaia, like all known stegosaurians, showed an array of plates and spikes, consisting of skin ossifications or osteoderms. Paired triangular plates ran down the midline of the neck, reconstructed as eight pairs. They were asymmetrical with a convex outer side and a concave inner side. Their bases were not very expanded with the exception of a possible last pair, located on the front back. They were obtuse but lightly hooked at the front. A rather long, narrow and straight preserved spike was at first considered to have been a shoulder spine, but was later seen as part of some tail arrangement.

=== Tail locomotion ===
In 2024, Lategano, Conti and Lozar examines the tail resistance of Miragaia longicollum, suggesting that its tail can achieve high speed and significant pressures, which would inflict predators by generating high-speed strikes.

== Classification ==
In 2009, Mateus and colleagues performed a phylogenetic analysis and found Miragaia to group with Dacentrurus in a clade Dacentrurinae of the family Stegosauridae, newly named for the occasion, the sister group to Stegosaurus (the latter genus was in the cladistic analysis considered to include Hesperosaurus and Wuerhosaurus).

In 2017, Raven and Maidment published a new phylogenetic analysis, including almost every known stegosaurian genus:

- Thyreophora
  - Lesothosaurus diagnosticus
  - - - Laquintasaura venezuelae
      - Scutellosaurus lawleri
    - - Emausaurus ernsti
      - - Scelidosaurus harrisonii
        - - Alcovasaurus longispinus
          - Eurypoda
            - Ankylosauria
              - Sauropelta edwardsi
              - - Gastonia burgei
                - Euoplocephalus tutus
            - Stegosauria
              - Huayangosauridae
                - - Huayangosaurus taibaii
                  - Chungkingosaurus jiangbeiensis
                - - Tuojiangosaurus multispinus
                  - Paranthodon africanus
              - Stegosauridae
                - Jiangjunosaurus junggarensis
                - - Gigantspinosaurus sichuanensis
                  - - Kentrosaurus aethiopicus
                    - - Dacentrurus armatus
                      - - Loricatosaurus priscus
                        - - - Hesperosaurus mjosi
                            - Miragaia longicollum
                          - - Stegosaurus stenops
                            - Wuerhosaurus homheni

The authors stressed that the only synapomorphy, shared derived trait, supporting the Dacentrurus-Stegosaurus clade was the possession of the long cervical postzygapophyses, and that these are in fact unknown for Dacentrurus itself, so that its close position to Stegosaurus was merely based on the new data provided by the description of Miragaia.

== See also ==
- 2009 in paleontology
- Timeline of stegosaur research
