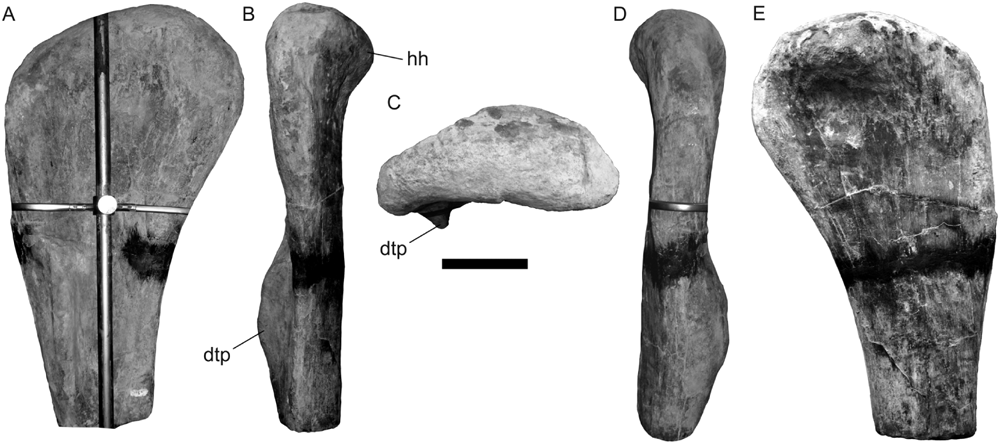
- Holotype humerus

Scientific classification
- Kingdom: Animalia
- Phylum: Chordata
- Class: Reptilia
- Clade: Dinosauria
- Clade: Saurischia
- Clade: †Sauropodomorpha
- Clade: †Sauropoda
- Clade: †Eusauropoda
- Clade: †Macronaria
- Family: †Brachiosauridae
- Genus: †Lusotitan; Antunes & Mateus, 2003
- Species: †L. atalaiensis

Binomial name
- †Lusotitan atalaiensis (Lapparent & Zbyszewski, 1957 [originally Brachiosaurus])

Synonyms
- Brachiosaurus atalaiensis Lapparent & Zbyszewski, 1957; Galvesaurus herreroi? Barco et al., 2005; Galveosaurus herreroi? Sánchez Hernández, 2005

= Lusotitan =

Lusotitan Temporal range: Late Jurassic, 152 Ma

Sauropod dinosaur genus from the late Jurassic Period

Lusotitan is a genus of herbivorous brachiosaurid sauropod dinosaur from the Late Jurassic of Portugal.

== Discovery and naming ==
In 1947 Manuel de Matos, a member of the Geological Survey of Portugal, discovered large sauropod fossils in the Portuguese Lourinhã Formation that date back to the Tithonian stage of the Late Jurassic period. In 1957 Albert-Félix de Lapparent and Georges Zbyszewski named the remains as a new species of Brachiosaurus: Brachiosaurus atalaiensis. The specific name referred to the site Atalaia. In 2003 Octávio Mateus and Miguel Telles Antunes named it as a separate genus: Lusotitan. The type species is Lusotitan atalaiensis. The generic name is derived from Luso, the Latin name for an inhabitant of Lusitania, and from the Greek word "Titan", a mythological giant.

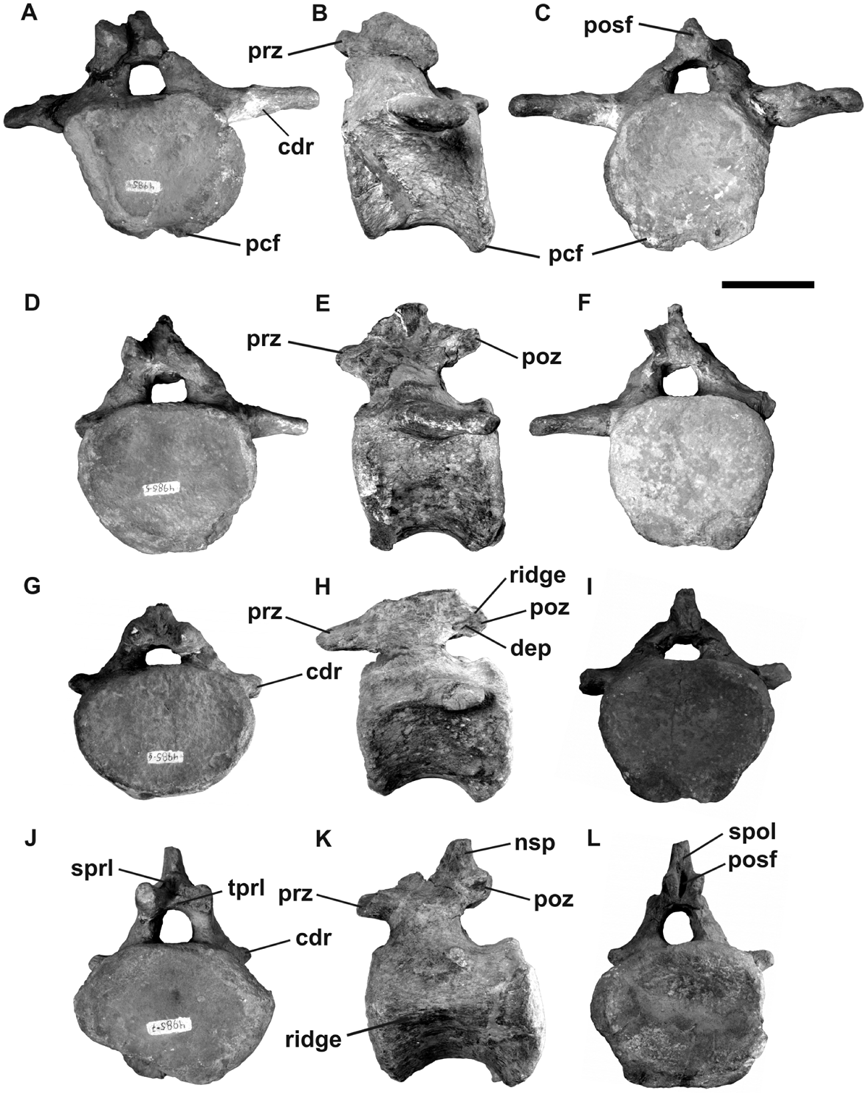
Caudal vertebrae of Lusotitan

The finds consisted of a partial skeleton lacking the skull and individual vertebrae uncovered in several locations. De Lapparent did not assign a holotype. In 2003 Mateus chose the skeleton as the lectotype. The remains included 28 vertebrae and elements of the appendicular skeleton.

The lectotype was re-described by Mannion and colleagues in 2013. In 2017, Mocho, Royo-Torres and Ortega suggested that Galvesaurus or Galveosaurus from the Late Jurassic of Spain might represent a junior synonym of this taxon. However, a 2019 description of new material of Galvesaurus by Perez-Pueyo et al. identified phylogenetically informative characters to distinguish it from Lusotitan which was recovered as its sister taxon.

== Description ==
Lusotitan was a large sauropod, reaching 21 m (69 ft) in length and 25–30 tonnes (28–33 short tons) in body mass. It had long forearms with the humerus and femur measuring 2.05 m (6.7 ft) and 2 m (6.6 ft) in length, respectively. A large sternal plate that possibly refers to this genus, could indicate larger sizes. A partial skeleton from the Bombarral Formation came from a 25 m (82 ft) long animal and, according to its describers, it comes from Lusotitan.

== Paleoecology ==
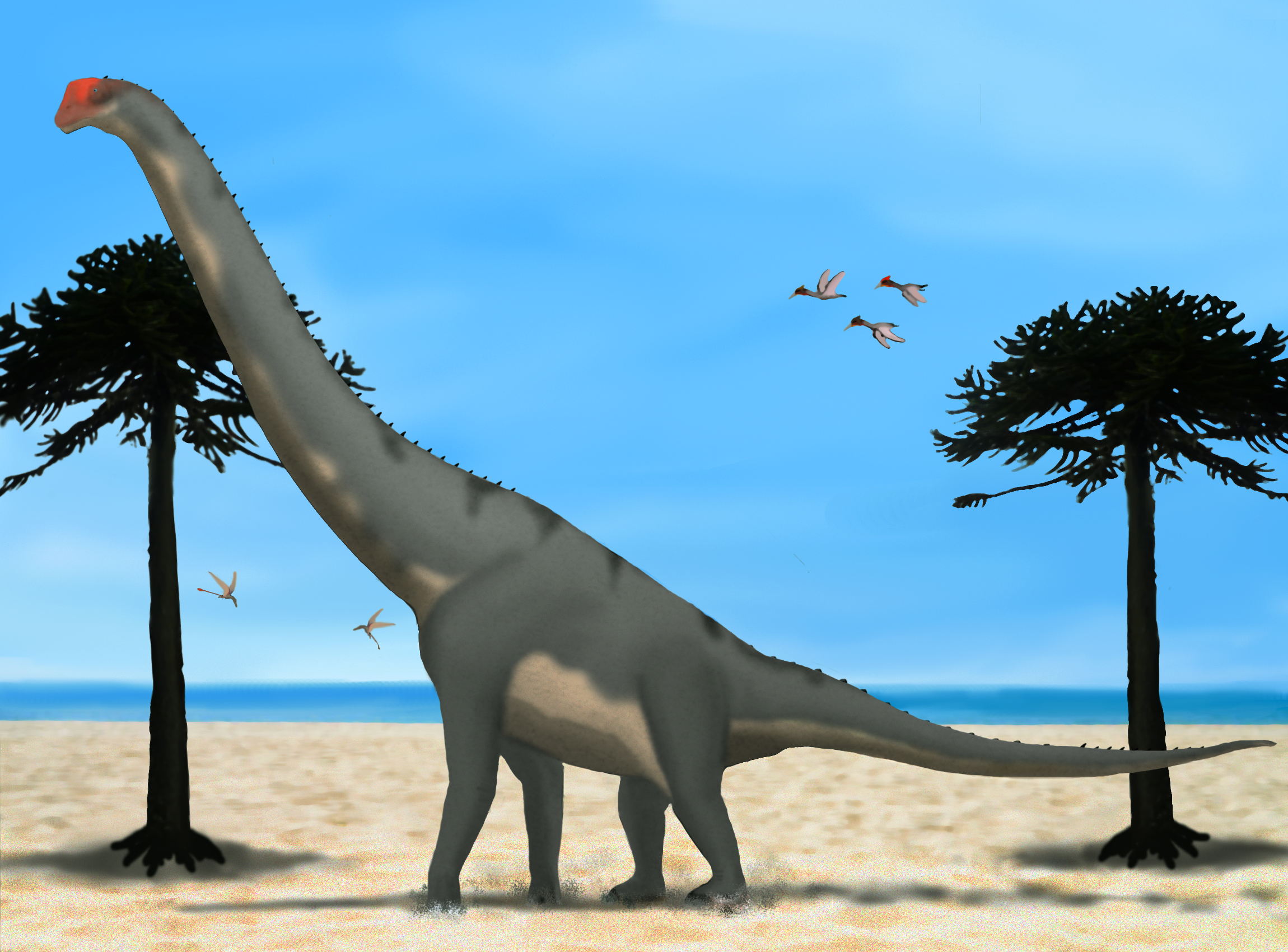
Hypothetical reconstruction of Lusotitan

The Lourinhã Formation of western Portugal was likely to be formed during the Kimmeridgian or Tithonian ages of the Late Jurassic period. The area is a coastal region with a strong marine influence. Its flora and fauna are similar to the Morrison Formation in the United States, and the Tendaguru Formation in Tanzania. Lusotitan is the largest dinosaur that has been discovered in the area. Lusotitan lived alongside species of the predatory theropods Allosaurus, Ceratosaurus, Lourinhanosaurus, and Torvosaurus, the ankylosaurian Dracopelta, the sauropods Bothriospondylus, Lourinhasaurus, and Zby, and the stegosaurs Dacentrurus and Miragaia.
