= Taveirosaurus =

Taveirosaurus Temporal range: Late Cretaceous, Maastrichtian

Scientific classification
- Kingdom: Animalia
- Phylum: Chordata
- Class: Mammalia
- Order: †Eutriconodonta
- Genus: †Taveirosaurus; Antunes & Sigogneau-Russell, 1991
- Species: †T. costai

Binomial name
- †Taveirosaurus costai Antunes & Sigogneau-Russell, 1991

Extinct genus of dinosaurs

Taveirosaurus (meaning "Taveiro lizard") is a genus of possibly eutriconodontan mammal from the Late Cretaceous Argilas de Aveiro Formation of Portugal, and also Laño, Spain. The genus is based solely on teeth, and the type species is T. costai.

== Discovery and naming ==
In 1968, Miguel Telles Antunes and Giuseppe Manuppella uncovered fossils at the Cerâmica do Mondego quarry near Taveiro, a village in Portugal, southwest of Coimbra. Among them were a number of low triangular teeth of a herbivorous dinosaur. In 1991 these were named and described by Telles Antunes and Denise Sigogneau-Russell as the type species, Taveirosaurus costai. The generic name refers to Taveiro. The specific name honours the Portuguese geologist João Carrington da Costa.

The holotype, CEGUNL-TV 10, was found in ancient river clay of the Argilas de Aveiro Formation dating from the Maastrichtian. It consists of one tooth. Nine other teeth were also assigned to the genus, CEGUNL-TV 6–9, 11 and 13–16. Later, more teeth found near Laño in Spain were referred to Taveirosaurus.

== Classification ==
Having only the teeth to base themselves on, Telles Antunes and Sigogneau originally thought that Taveirosaurus belonged to some pachycephalosaurian group. In 1991 they assigned it to the Homalocephalidae, in 1992 to the Pachycephalosauridae. However, they soon rejected this possibility, and Taveirosaurus has not been included in this group in recent reviews. In 1995, it was considered to be a member of the Nodosauridae. In 1996 Peter Galton suggested it might have belonged to the Fabrosauridae, pointing out a similarity to the teeth of Alocodon and Trimucrodon, two other "tooth genera". In 2004 David B. Norman concluded it was a nomen dubium and was unable to identify Taveirosaurus further than Ornithischia. A revision of early-diverging ornithischian phylogeny found that instead of ornithischians, the teeth of Taveirosaurus show the most similarities with members of the early mammal group Eutriconodonta, lacking characteristics of ornithischian teeth while showing a straight cingulum and linear cusps found within eutriconodontans of similar Cretaceous age.
