= Dracopelta =

Dracopelta Temporal range: Late Jurassic, Tithonian

Scientific classification
- Kingdom: Animalia
- Phylum: Chordata
- Class: Reptilia
- Clade: Dinosauria
- Clade: †Ornithischia
- Clade: †Thyreophora
- Clade: †Ankylosauria
- Family: †incertae sedis
- Genus: †Dracopelta
- Species: †D. zbyszewskii

Binomial name
- †Dracopelta zbyszewskii Galton, 1980

Extinct genus of dinosaurs

Dracopelta (meaning "dragon shield") is a monospecific genus of ankylosaurian dinosaur that lived during the Late Jurassic (uppermost lower Tithonian-upper Tithonian, 152.1-145.0 Ma) in what is now the Lourinhã Formation, Portugal. The type and only species is Dracopelta zbyszewskii, which is represented by a partial skeleton including unpublished material.

== Discovery and naming ==
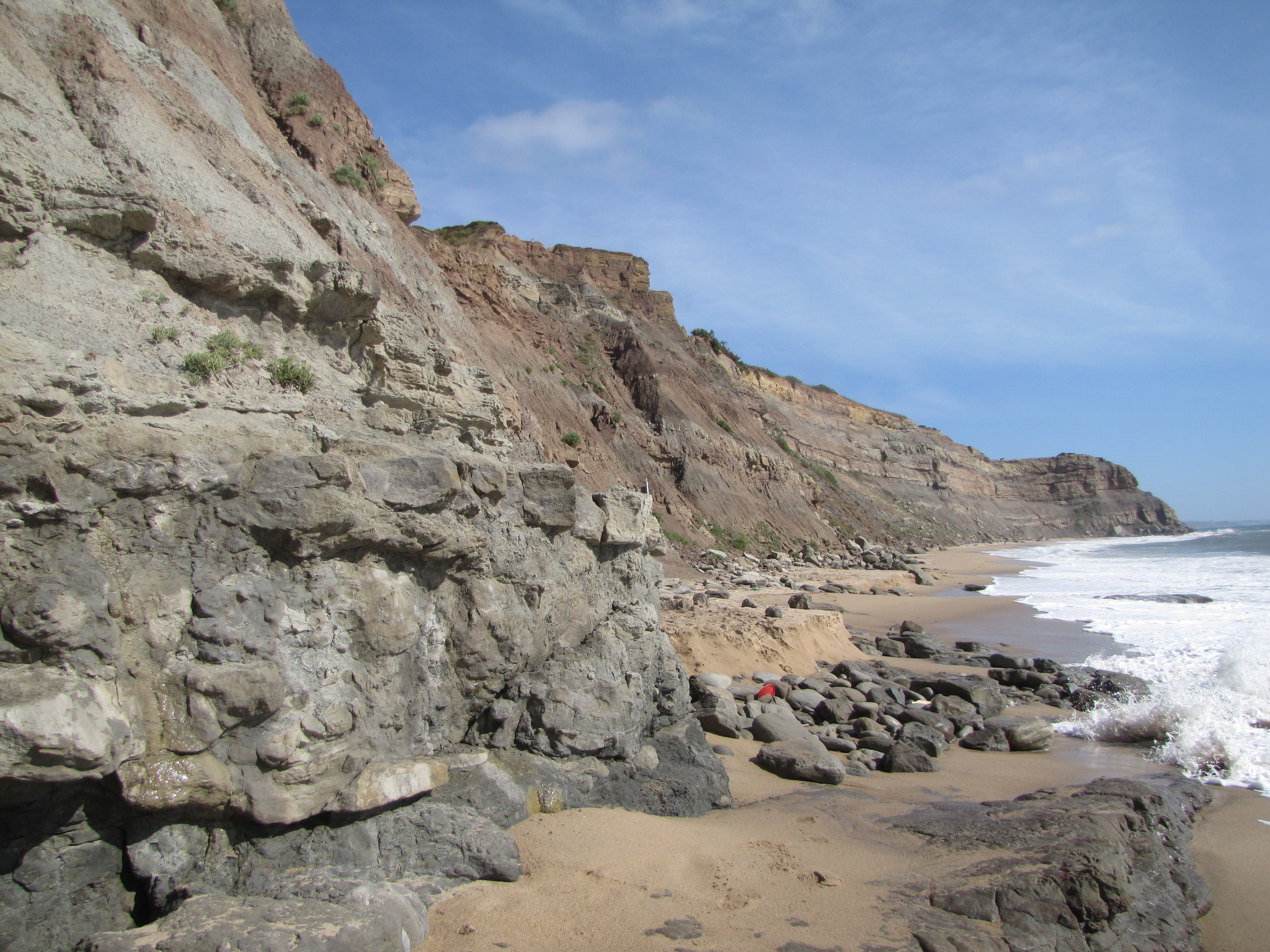
Lourinhã Formation in Portugal

In 1963 or, more likely, early 1964, a partial skeleton was discovered during road construction works between the village of Barril and Praia da Assenta. Leonel Trindade confirmed the presence of the fossil in the area and photographed the specimen in situ. Georges Zbyszewski and Octávio da Veiga Ferreir organized the excavation and extraction of the specimen in December 1964. Parts of the specimen were unprepared and misplaced, mixed in with a specimen of Miragaia. The holotype specimen, MG 3 (formerly IGM 5787 and IGM 3), consists of dorsal vertebrae, articulated proximal ribs, osteoderms, an incomplete autopodium and unpublished material including a tibia, femur, and an ossified tendon. Currently new material pertaining to the holotype specimen is being described. The generic name, Dracopelta, is derived from the Latin word draco (dragon) and the Greek word πέλτη, pelte, (Latinised to pelta), "small shield". The specific name, zbyszewskii, honours Georges Zbyszewski, after his research on fossil vertebrates from Portugal.

The holotype was originally, and incorrectly, identified to be from the Kimmeridgian stage of Ribamar. However, Antunes and Mateus (2003) noted that at a locality named Ribamar, there are outcrops of Lower Cretaceous that date to the Valanginian and Albian stages and deemed it as highly unlikely that the specimen was obtained from that locality. Pereda-Suberbiola et al. (2005) determined that the specimen was from a locality constrained to the uppermost lower Tithonian-upper Tithonian which shows characteristics consistent with what is recognized in the Assenta Member of the Lourinhã Formation, an observation agreed upon by Russo and Mateus (2021).

In 2019, a specimen of an ankylosaur consisting of a nearly complete skull, articulated dorsal vertebrae, proximal half of ribs, articulated anterior caudal vertebrae, mostly complete and articulated synsacrum, fragments of disarticulated and broken ribs, femora, partial ilia with attached pelvic shield, humerus, partial scapulocoracoid, tendons mostly attached to vertebrae, and osteoderms from the Lourinhã Formation was reported. The specimen is currently being studied on to clarify if it represents an additional, more complete specimen, of Dracopelta or a new taxon.

== Description ==
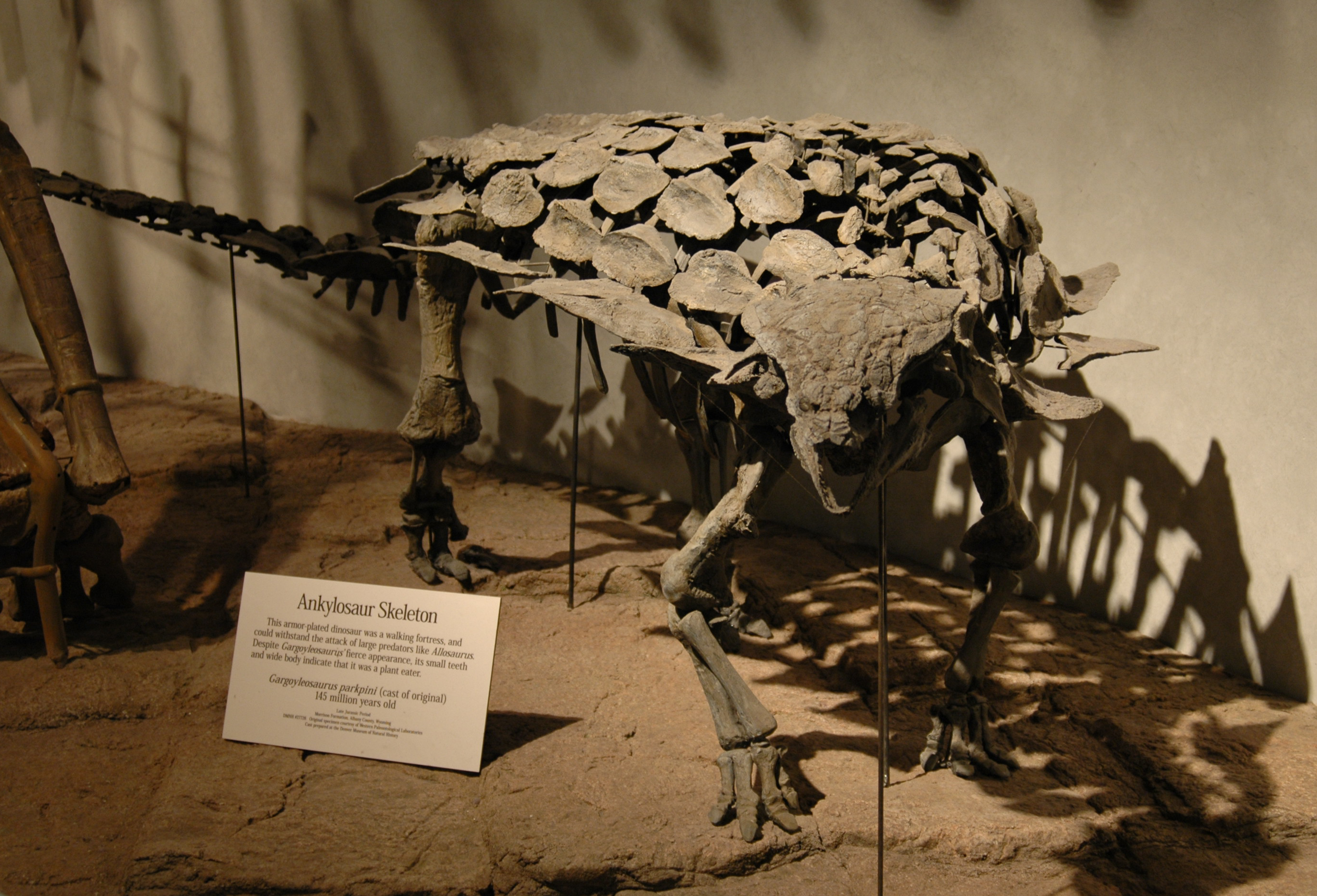
Mount of Gargoyleosaurus, an ankylosaur from the Late Jurassic Morrison Formation

In 2010, Gregory S. Paul estimated the body length of Dracopelta at 3 metres (9.8 ft) and its weight at 300 kilograms (660 lb). A later publication suggested a greater length of 4–6 m (13–20 ft). The holotype specimen represents an adult individual.

Galton (1980) originally diagnosed Dracopelta based on the small flat osteoderms, small medial paired circular plated with raised centre and rims, long anterolateral plates, narrow nonprojecting overlapping dorsolateral plates and overlapping laterally projecting lateral plates in the thoracic region. Suberbiola et al. (2005) later diagnosed Dracopelta based on the presence of proximal phalanges II and III as long as wide and distinctive osteoderm morphology. The dorsal ribs are gently curved which indicates that the back was broad, much like that of other ankylosaurs, Dryosaurus and Camptosaurus, and the base is at about the same level as the postzygapophyses and prezygapophyses. The prezygapophyses are just above the dorsal margin of the neural canal and are about 80 mm above the ventral rim of the centrum. The ribs are correlated with the possession of transverse processes that are inclined slightly upwards, a feature that differentiates it from Dacentrurus, a stegosaur also from the Lourinhã Formation. The holotype preserves ossified tendons which is a feature seen in ankylosaurs, ornithopods and possibly Scelidosaurus.

Suberbiola et al. (2005) noted that the manus of Dracopelta may have retained a primitive phalangeal formula, as in the nodosaurid Sauropelta and basal thyreophoran Scutellosaurus, while ankylosaurids and stegosaurs showed a reduced phalangeal formula. Suberbiola et al. suggested that derived ankylosaurids and stegosaurs convergently evolved a tridactyl pes, with the loss of digit I, while Liaoningosaurus pertained a tetradactyl manus and a tridactyl pes. The authors interpreted that Dracopelta may have had cursorial adaptations as the autopodial structure falls into the metapodial range of the basal thyreophorans Scutellosaurus and Scelidosaurus, which were probably subcursorial. The small size of Dracopelta is also consistent with the interpretation.

== Classification ==
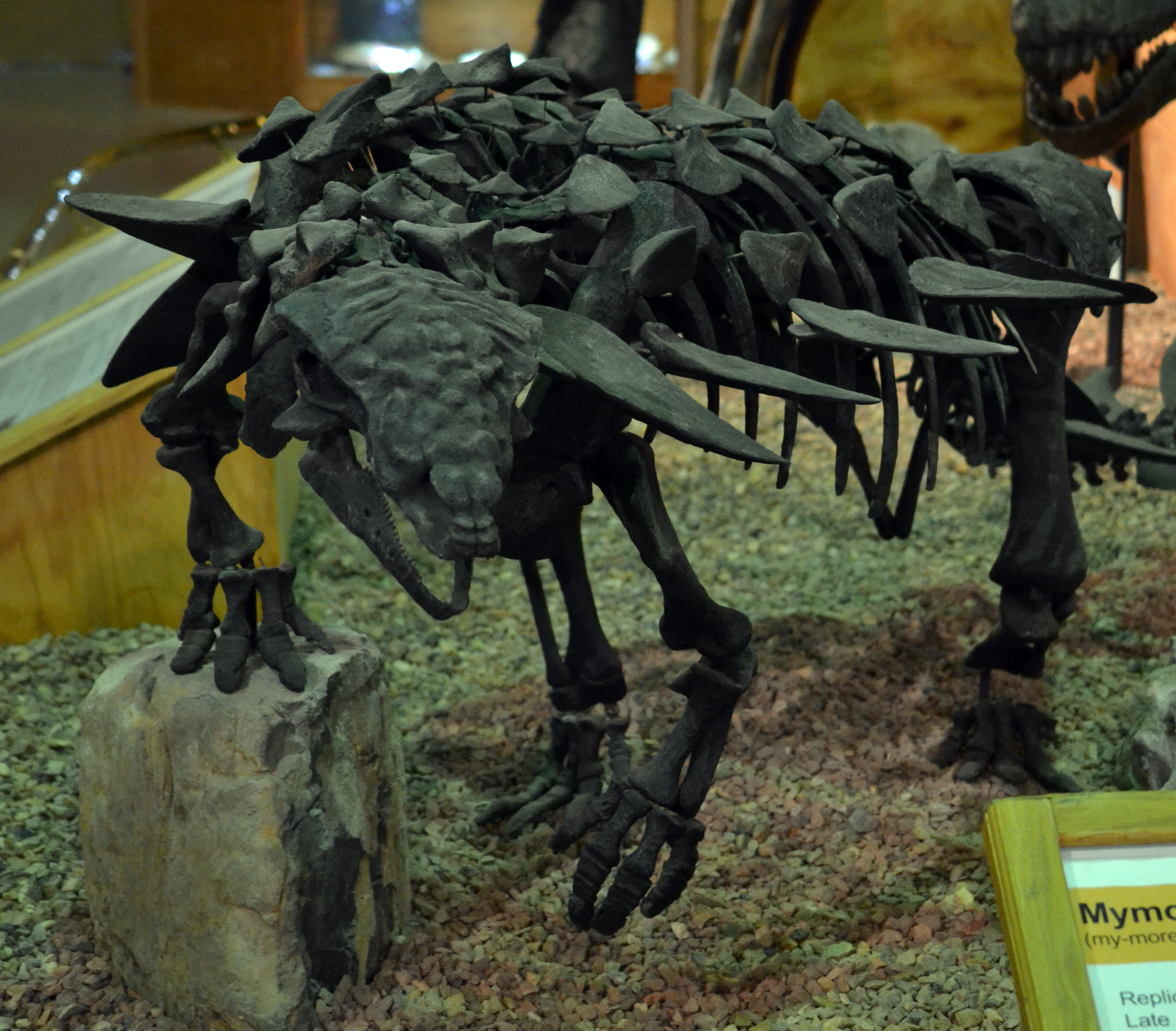
Mount of Mymoorapelta, a basal ankylosaur from the Morrison Formation

Galton (1980) originally assigned Dracopelta to Nodosauridae, based on the morphology of the osteoderms. However, Vickaryous et al. (2004) interpreted Dracopelta as Ankylosauria incertae sedis while Carpenter (2001) considered it as a nomen dubium based on the lack off diagnostic characteristic of the holotype specimen and assigned it as Polacanthidae incertae sedis based on the similarities between Gargoyleosaurus and Gastonia in osteoderm morphology. Suberbiola et al. (2005) were unable to recognize any polacanthid or nodosaurid characteristics and considered Dracopelta as a valid taxon based on the presence of proximal phalanges II and III as long as wide and distinctive osteoderm morphology. Due to the close proximities between the fauna of the Morrison Formation and Lourinhã Formation, Dracopelta might share close affinities with Gargoyleosaurus or Mymoorapelta.

== Paleoenvironment ==
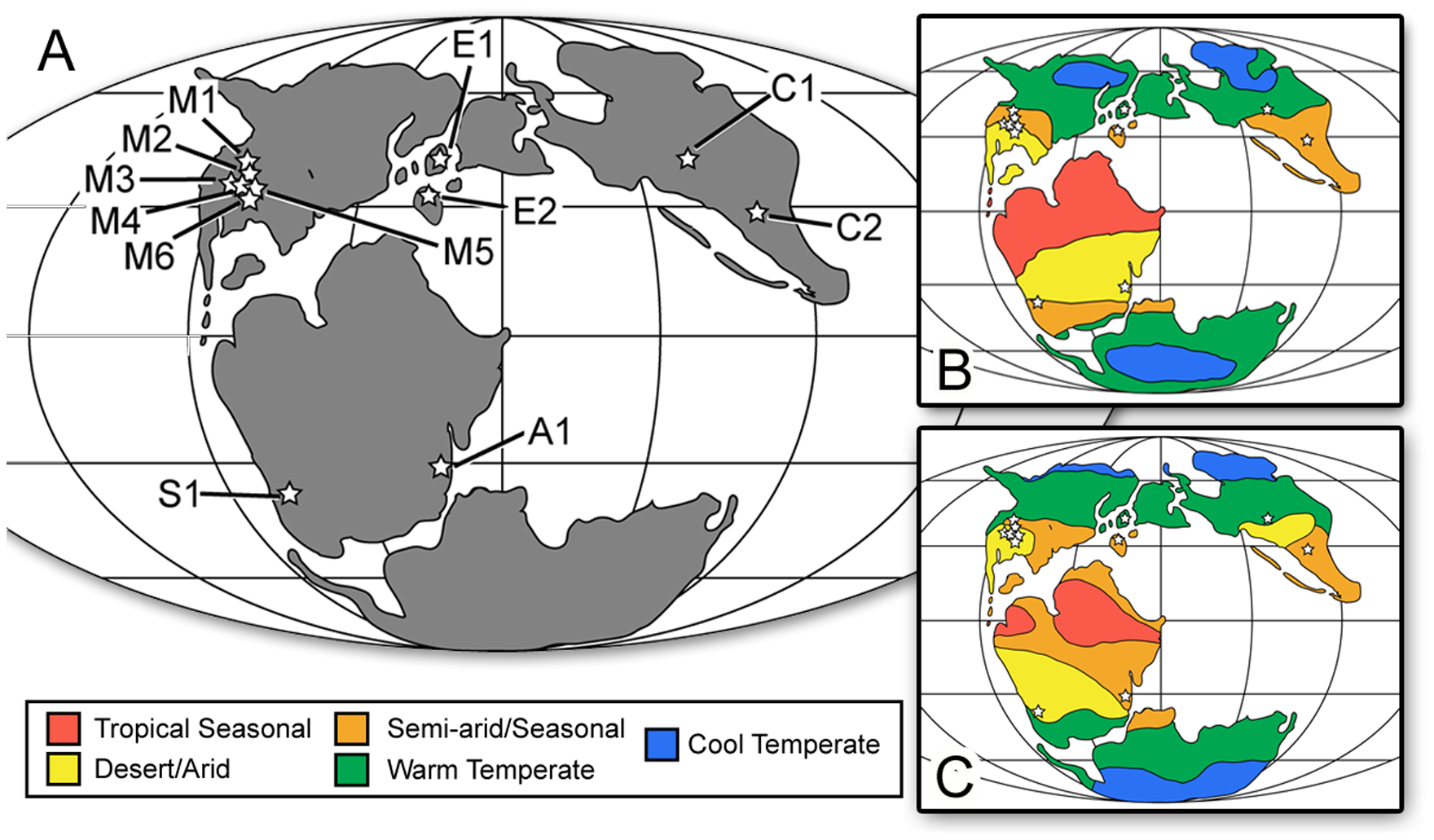
Paleogeography and paleoclimate of the Late Jurassic

The holotype specimen of Dracopelta was obtained from a layer from the Assenta Member of the Lourinhã Formation, which dates to the uppermost lower and upper Tithonian stage of the Late Jurassic. The member represents a fluvial channel and preserves small coalified plant fragments. The member is characterised by a succession of fluvial sandstones insinuated by erosive surfaces showing fossilised roots and bioturbation, indicating periodic subaerial exposure. Dracopelta would have coexisted with the carcharodontosaurian Lusovenator, indeterminate turiasaurian sauropods, indeterminate crocodylomorphs, and an indeterminate ankylosaur, which may represent a second and more complete specimen of Dracopelta.

== See also ==
- Timeline of ankylosaur research
