= Porto Dinheiro =

Locality in Lourinhã, Portugal

Coordinates: 39.2136°N 9.3447°W

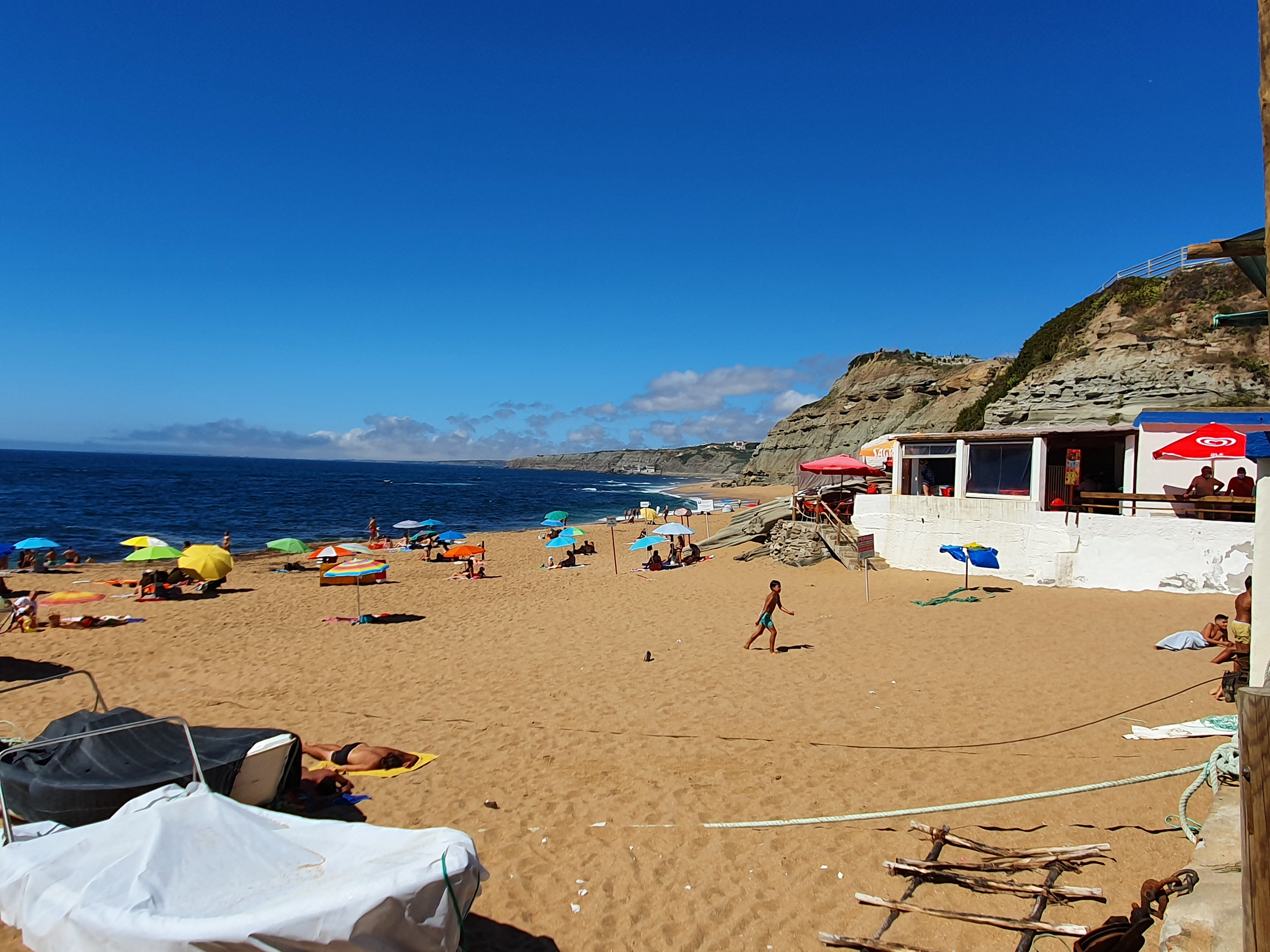
Praia de Porto Dinheiro

Porto Dinheiro (or Praia de Porto Dinheiro) is a locality in the civil parish (freguesia) of Ribamar, municipality of Lourinhã, in Portugal.

It is known as a rich fossil locality, from where were found many Late Jurassic dinosaurs and mammals. A few even received the locality name, like the Dinheirosaurus lourinhanensis and Jurassic mammals like Portopinheirodon asymmetricus and the multituberculates family Pinheirodontidae. The second one is the based for a new family of mammals, the Pinheirodontidae. A diverse ichnofauna is known in that site.

This locality was once considered to be early Cretaceous in age, but it is Tithonian (Late Jurassic).
