= Museu da Lourinhã =

Portuguese archeology museum in Lourinha

Coordinates: 39.2420°N 9.3133°W

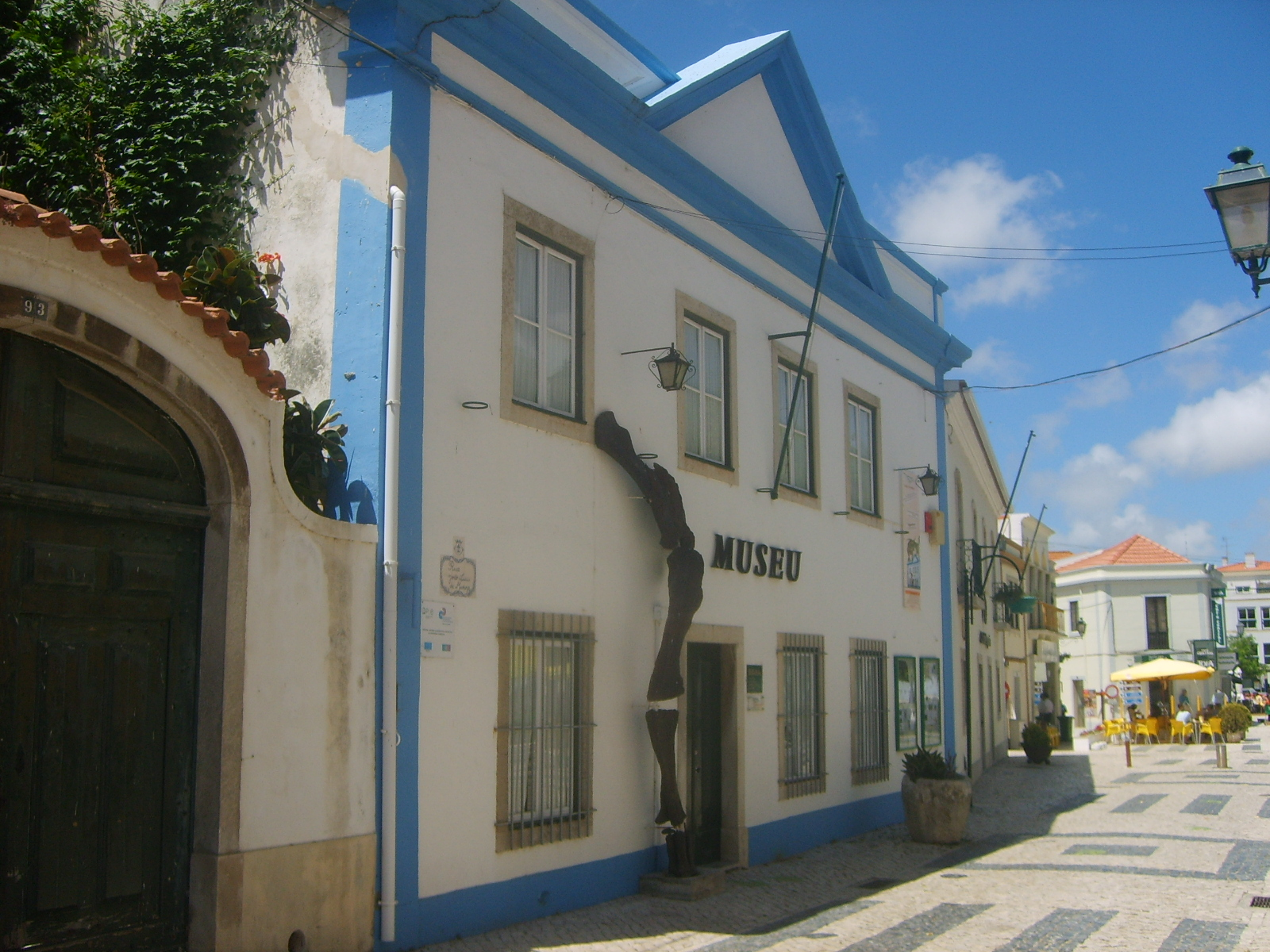
The Museu da Lourinhã in August 2008

Museu da Lourinhã, also known as the Lourinhã Museum, is a museum in the town of Lourinhã, west Portugal. It was founded in 1984 by GEAL - Grupo de Etnologia e Arqueologia da Lourinhã (Lourinhã's Group of Ethnology and Archeology). The current president of the Direction Board is Margarida Nobre.

The museum has very complete exhibits of archaeology and ethnology, but the main focus of the museum is the palaeontology hall, which presents holotypes and cast of famous Portuguese dinosaurs recovered from the Late Jurassic Lourinhã Formation. One of the most famous findings exposed is theropod nest found at the beach of Paimogo, which contains eggs with embryos inside, probably belonging to Lourinhanosaurus. Some of the fossils that belong to the Museu da Lourinhã are on display at Dinoparque Lourinhã, such as the sauropod Zby atlanticus, Lourinhanosaurus antunesi, and Torvosaurus gurneyi.

The paleontological research has been conducted by portuguese and international paleontologists, most of them in association with the Universidade Nova de Lisboa.

The museum receives about 25.000 visitors every year. The museum allows people to volunteer for its activities.
