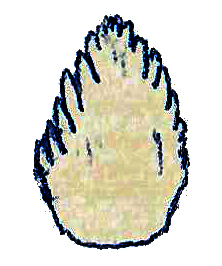
- Holotype tooth

Scientific classification
- Kingdom: Animalia
- Phylum: Chordata
- Class: Reptilia
- Clade: Dinosauria
- Clade: †Ornithischia
- Clade: †Neornithischia
- Genus: †Phyllodon; Thulborn, 1973
- Species: †P. henkeli

Binomial name
- †Phyllodon henkeli Thulborn, 1973

= Phyllodon =

Phyllodon Temporal range: Kimmeridgian, 155 Ma Late Jurassic

Extinct genus of dinosaurs

Phyllodon (meaning "leaf tooth") is a genus of small ornithischian dinosaur from the Late Jurassic (Kimmeridgian) Camadas de Guimarota Formation of Leiria, Portugal and possibly also the Middle Jurassic (Bathonian) Chipping Norton Limestone of England. It may have been closely related to contemporaneous ornithischian dinosaurs from North America. This genus is known from teeth and possibly partial lower jaws. The name is also in use for a genus of modern moss, but this is not considered to be a problem because the two organisms are in two different kingdoms.

== History ==
Phyllodon is based on MGSP G5, a partial lower jaw tooth recovered from a lignite marl in a mine near the city of Leiria. Richard Thulborn, who described the genus, added an upper beak tooth (MGSP G2). He regarded the new genus as a hypsilophodontid, and presented a conjectural restoration of the tooth arrangement. Peter Galton, reviewing Late Jurassic North American hypsilophodontids a few years later, found that the Phyllodon teeth best matched those of Nanosaurus, and agreed with a hypsilophodontid identity because the lower jaw tooth is asymmetric in front and back views.

Sometime before 2004, possible Phyllodon remains were recovered from the Chipping Norton Limestone of England. It is likely that these remains actually belonged to an indeterminate ornithischian separate from Phyllodon.

Because of the sparse material, Phyllodon has often been tossed off as a dubious basal ornithopod of uncertain affinities. However, more material that might belong to this genus has been recovered from the original locality and described. Included in this material are over 120 more teeth from all parts of the jaw and four partial lower jaws with the teeth lost. Oliver Rauhut, who described the new material, tentatively identified the lower jaws as Phyllodon due to there being no other similar dinosaurs found at the locality. The teeth were very small (up to 3 millimeters across, or 0.1 inches) and possibly juvenile. He also found additional diagnostic characteristics for Phyllodon in the new material, including very tall upper jaw teeth, indicating that it could be a valid genus after all. After comparing it to other hypsilophodonts, he found that it best matched the roughly contemporaneous Drinker of the North American Morrison Formation, with various details suggesting that they were closely related. Similarly, Galton found its teeth to be similar to those of Drinker and Nanosaurus in his 2006 review.

== Paleobiology ==
As a hypsilophodontid or other basal ornithopod, Phyllodon would have been a bipedal herbivore. Its size has not been estimated, but as most adult hypsilophodonts were 1–2 meters (3.3–6.6 ft) long, this genus would probably have been of similar size. Its similarity to the North American Drinker and Nanosaurus is another piece of evidence linking Late Jurassic Portuguese dinosaur faunas with the contemporaneous Morrison Formation dinosaurs.
