= Turginskaya Svita =

Geologic formation in Russia

- Stratigraphic range: Early Cretaceous, Berriasian–Hauterivian
- Type: Geological formation

Location
- Region: Buryatia
- Country: Russia

The Turginskaya Svita is an Early Cretaceous period geologic formation located in Russia. Dinosaur remains were recovered from it as early as 1915, including partial theropod remains.

== Paleofauna ==
- Theropoda (previously informally known as Allosaurus? sibiricus, Antrodemus? sibiricus and currently known as Chilantaisaurus? sibiricus)

== See also ==
- List of dinosaur-bearing rock formations
  - List of stratigraphic units with few dinosaur genera
