= Bombarral Formation =

- Stratigraphic range: Tithonian

The Bombarral Formation is Late Jurassic geologic formation in Portugal. The formation has produced the remains of multiple vertebrates,including non-avian dinosaurs. It was deposited during the Tithonian of the Jurassic period.

== Stratigraphy and paleoenviroment ==
The Bombarral Formation outcrops around Pombal, Portugal. It is considered a laterally equivalent but distinct rock sequence to the more well known Lourinhã Formation. It is interpreted as being deposited during the Tithonian of the Late Jurassic period. Its Lithology is primarily represented of massive fine-grained, micaceous sandstones that are mixed with red mudstones. It is interpreted as having been formed in a floodplain ecosystem.

== Vertebrate paleofauna ==
=== Dinosaurs ===
==== Sauropods ====
Genus	Species	Material	Notes
Brachiosauridae indet.	Indeterminate	Postcranial material	Stated to have come from a 25 m long animal. From outside sources, the authors imply that the remains belong to Lusotitan.
Diplodocidae indet.	Indeterminate	Multiple skeletal remains	Multiple remains from indeterminate diplodocines. Whether or not they come from one taxon or multiple is uncertain.
Turiasauria indet	Indeterminate	Teeth	Multiple teeth from indeterminate turiasaurs.

==== Theropods ====
Genus	Species	Material	Notes
Allosaurus	A. europaeus	Multiple skeletal remains	Validity disputed,Some authors argue instead that they belong to A.fragilis.
Torvosaurus	T.cf.gurneyi	Teeth	Teeth referred to Torvosaurus on the basis of cladisitics and multivariate analysis.
Tyrannosauroidea indet.	Indeterminate	Teeth	Teeth referred to indeterminate Tyrannosauroids.

==== Ornithischia ====
Genus	Species	Material	Notes
Dacentrurus	D. armatus	Skeletal remains	A large stegosaur.
Ankylopollexia indet.	Indeterminate	Teeth	Teeth stated to be similar to Camptosaurus.
Dryosauridae indet.	Indeterminate	Postcranial remains	Remains stated to be similar to Dryosaurus.
