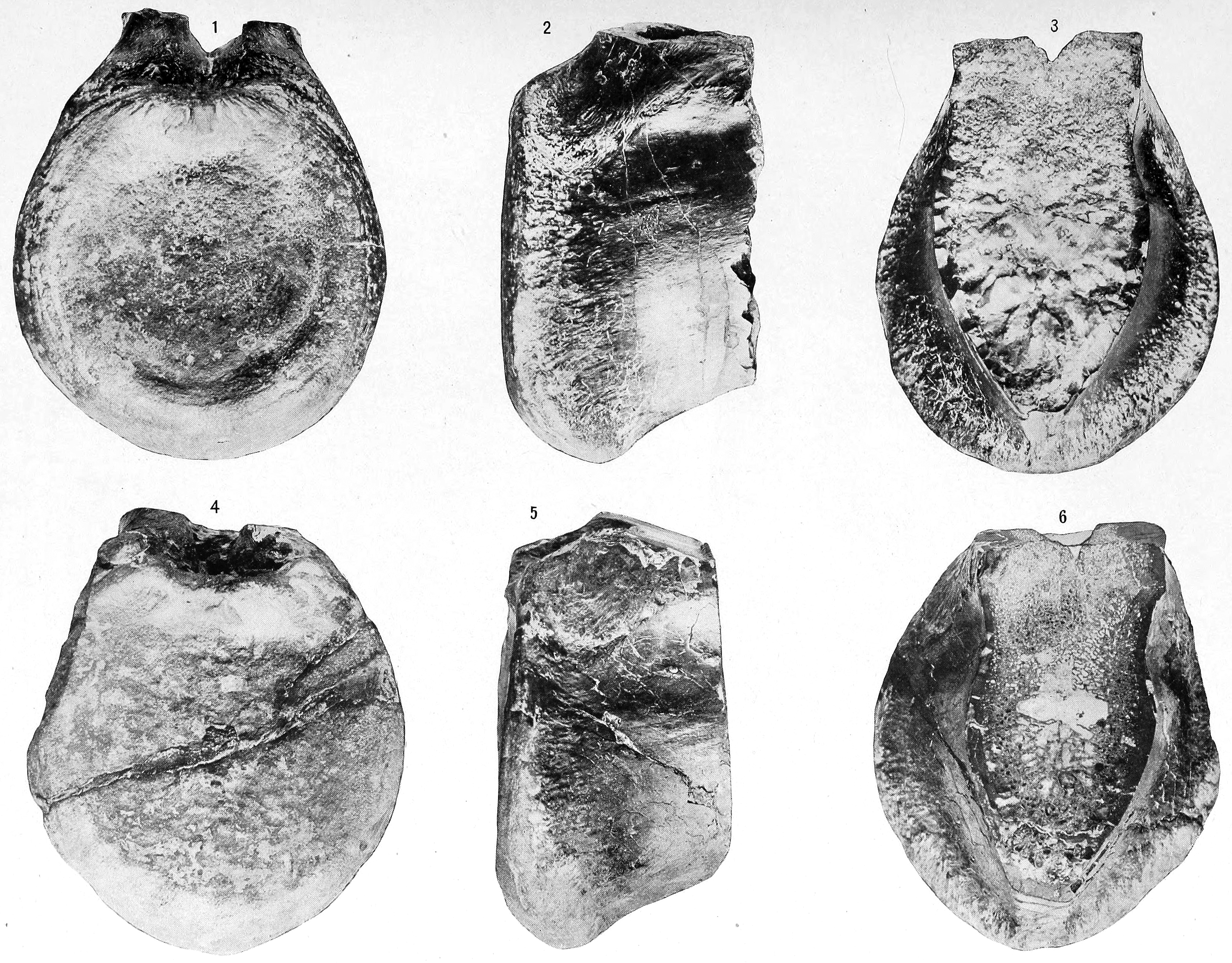
- Holotype tail vertebra (above) compared to the same of Allosaurus (below)

Scientific classification
- Kingdom: Animalia
- Phylum: Chordata
- Class: Reptilia
- Clade: Dinosauria
- Clade: Saurischia
- Clade: Theropoda
- Family: †Allosauridae
- Genus: †Antrodemus; Leidy, 1870
- Species: †A. valens

Binomial name
- †Antrodemus valens (Leidy, 1870) Leidy, 1873

Synonyms
- Poekilopleuron valens Leidy, 1870; Megalosaurus valens (Leidy, 1870) Nopcsa, 1901; Allosaurus valens (Leidy, 1870) Huene, 1932

= Antrodemus =

Antrodemus Temporal range: Late Jurassic, 150 Ma

Extinct genus of dinosaurs

Antrodemus ("chamber bodied") is a dubious genus of theropod dinosaur from the Upper Jurassic, probably the Morrison Formation, of Middle Park, Colorado. It contains one species, Antrodemus valens, first described and named as a species of Poekilopleuron by Joseph Leidy in 1870.

== Discovery and species ==
The first described fossil specimen was a bone obtained secondhand by Ferdinand Vandeveer Hayden in 1869 (original discoverer unknown). It came from Middle Park, near Granby, Colorado, probably from Morrison Formation rocks. Hayden reported that several similar fossils had been identified as petrified horse hooves. Hayden sent his specimen to Joseph Leidy, who identified it as half of a tail vertebra, and tentatively assigned it to the European dinosaur genus Poekilopleuron as Poicilopleuron [sic] valens, based on the shared presence of a large medullary cavity. He identified the presence of trabeculae in P. valens as a distinguishing character from P. bucklandii but also noted that should better remains show more characters that could sufficiently distinguish the two taxa, it might be named Antrodemus. In 1873, he amended his description and identified the species as Antrodemus valens.

In 1920, Charles W. Gilmore concluded that the tail vertebra named Antrodemus by Leidy was indistinguishable from those of Allosaurus and that Antrodemus should be the preferred name because, as the older name, it had priority. Antrodemus became the accepted name for this familiar genus for over fifty years until James Madsen published on the Cleveland-Lloyd Dinosaur Quarry specimens of Allosaurus in 1976 (today, that quarry in Utah is part of the Jurassic National Monument) and concluded that the Allosaurus name should be used because Antrodemus was based on material with poor, if any, diagnostic features and locality information (for example, the geological formation that the single bone of Antrodemus came from is unknown). Subsequent authors have agreed with this assessment and have considered Antrodemus a nomen dubium.

== 63-year long Antrodemus label ==
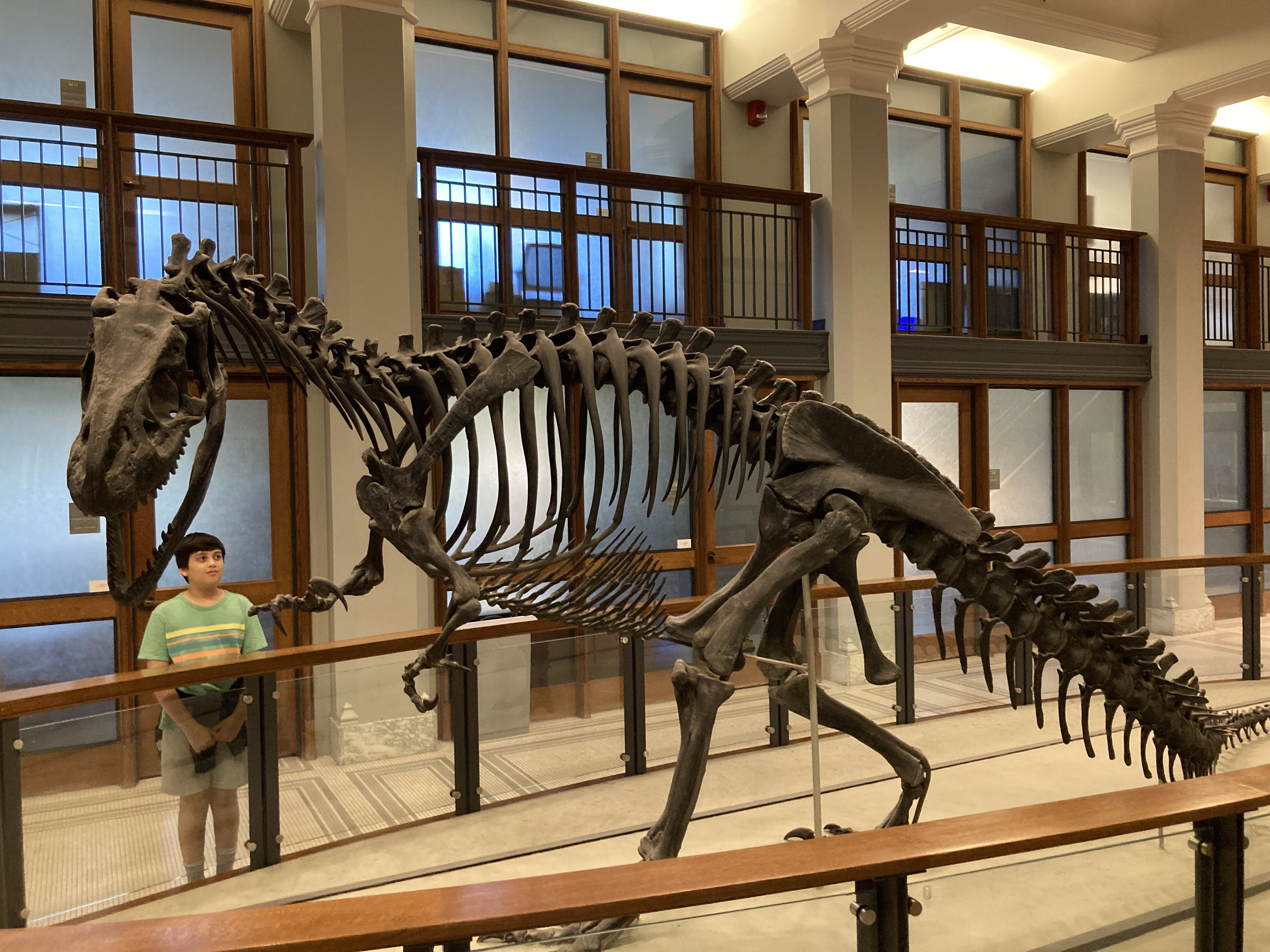
Allosaurus mount long labelled as Antrodemus at Princeton's Department of Geosciences in Guyot Hall (photograph taken in 2023 before the dismounting and relocation at Briger Hall).

At the Museum of the Geosciences Department, in the building formerly named as Guyot Hall (Note: Between 2024 and 2026, the Guyot Hall building, located at the New Jersey Campus of Princeton University, has been refurbished and expanded. At reopening it was re-inaugurated under the name of "Eric and Wendy Schmidt hall".) in Princeton University, Princeton, New Jersey, an Allosaurus skeleton has been labelled as Antrodemus for over 63 years between February 1961 and October 2024, thus still reading the name Antrodemus even after the specimens from the Cleveland-Lloyd Quarry were attributed to Allosaurus. That Allosaurus is the first skeletal mount obtained out of the Quarry. It was extracted in the late 1930s/early 1940s and finally mounted twenty years later in 1961 in Guyot Hall. In 2024 it was dismounted and sent to Canada for restoration and in 2026 it was reassembled in a more anatomically correct posture back at the Princeton's New Jersey Campus, though this time in Briger Hall, close to Guyot Hall, its former on-display location.
