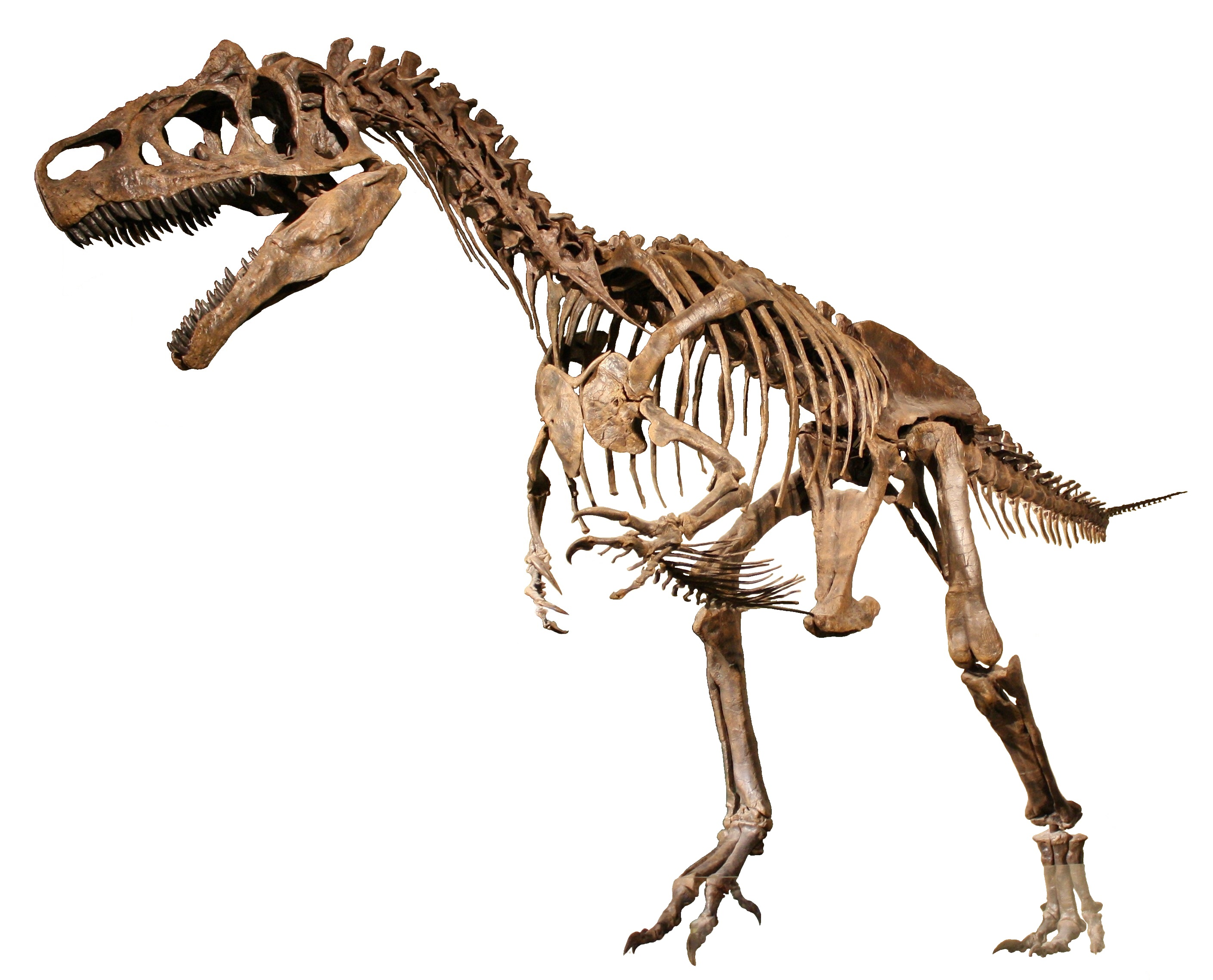
- Mounted cast of the specimen "Big Al 2" (Allosaurus jimmadseni) at the Houston Museum of Natural Science

Scientific classification
- Kingdom: Animalia
- Phylum: Chordata
- Class: Reptilia
- Clade: Dinosauria
- Clade: Saurischia
- Clade: Theropoda
- Family: †Allosauridae
- Subfamily: †Allosaurinae; Marsh, 1878
- Genus: †Allosaurus; Marsh, 1877

Type species
- †Allosaurus fragilis Marsh, 1877

Other species
- †A. europaeus Mateus et al., 2006; †A. jimmadseni Chure & Loewen, 2020; †A. anax Danison et al., 2024

Synonyms
- Genus synonymy: Antrodemus? Leidy, 1870; Creosaurus? Marsh, 1878; Epanterias? Cope, 1878; Labrosaurus? Marsh, 1879

= Allosaurus =

Allosaurus Temporal range: Late Jurassic (Oxfordian–Tithonian), 155–143.1 Ma

Genus of theropod dinosaur

Allosaurus (/ˌæləˈsɔːrəs/ AL-o-SAWR-us) is a genus of theropod dinosaur that lived 156 to 143 million years ago during the late Jurassic period (latest Oxfordian to latest Tithonian ages). The first fossil remains that could definitively be ascribed to this genus were described in 1877 by Othniel C. Marsh. The name "Allosaurus" means "different lizard", alluding to its lightweight vertebrae, which Marsh believed were unique. The genus has a very complicated taxonomy and includes at least three valid species, the best known of which is A. fragilis. The bulk of Allosaurus remains come from North America's Morrison Formation, with material also known from the Alcobaça, Bombarral, and Lourinhã formations in Portugal. It was known for over half of the 20th century as Antrodemus, but a study of the abundant remains from the Cleveland-Lloyd Dinosaur Quarry returned the name "Allosaurus" to prominence. As one of the first well-known theropod dinosaurs, it has long attracted attention outside of paleontological circles.

Allosaurus was a large bipedal predator for its time. Its skull was light, robust, and equipped with dozens of sharp, serrated teeth. It averaged 7.5–8 meters (25–26 ft) in length for A. fragilis, with the largest specimens of A. fragilis estimated as being 9 meters (30 ft) long. Relative to the large and powerful legs, its three-fingered hands were small and the body was balanced by a long, muscular tail. It is classified in the family Allosauridae. As the most abundant large predator of the Morrison Formation, Allosaurus was an apex predator of the food chain and probably preyed on large herbivorous dinosaurs such as ornithopods, stegosaurids, and sauropods. Scientists have debated whether Allosaurus had cooperative social behavior and hunted in packs or was a solitary predator that forms congregations, with evidence supporting both arguments.

== History of discovery ==
=== Initial finds and naming of Allosaurus ===
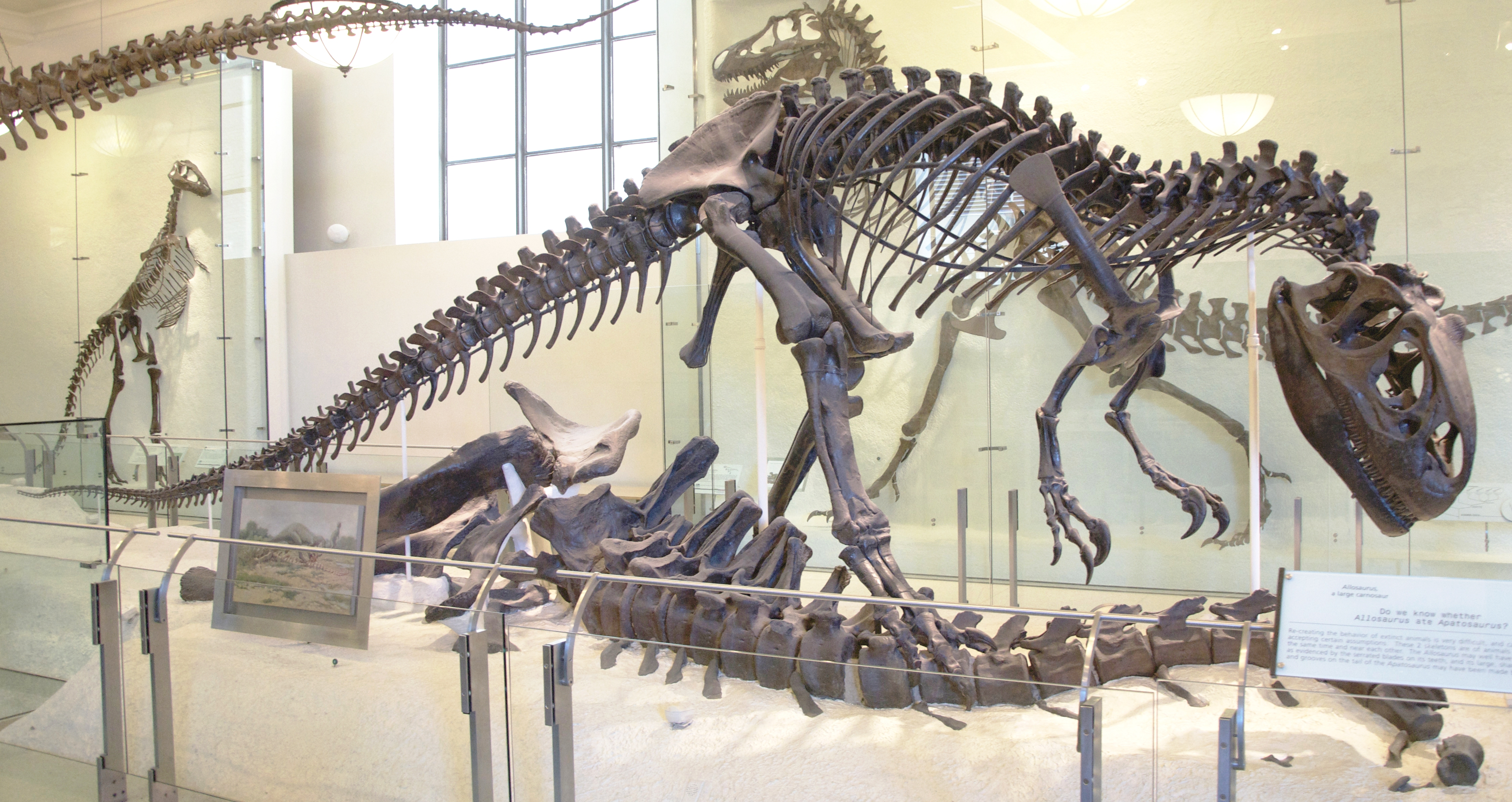
Mounted A. fragilis specimen (AMNH 5753), posed as scavenging an Apatosaurus

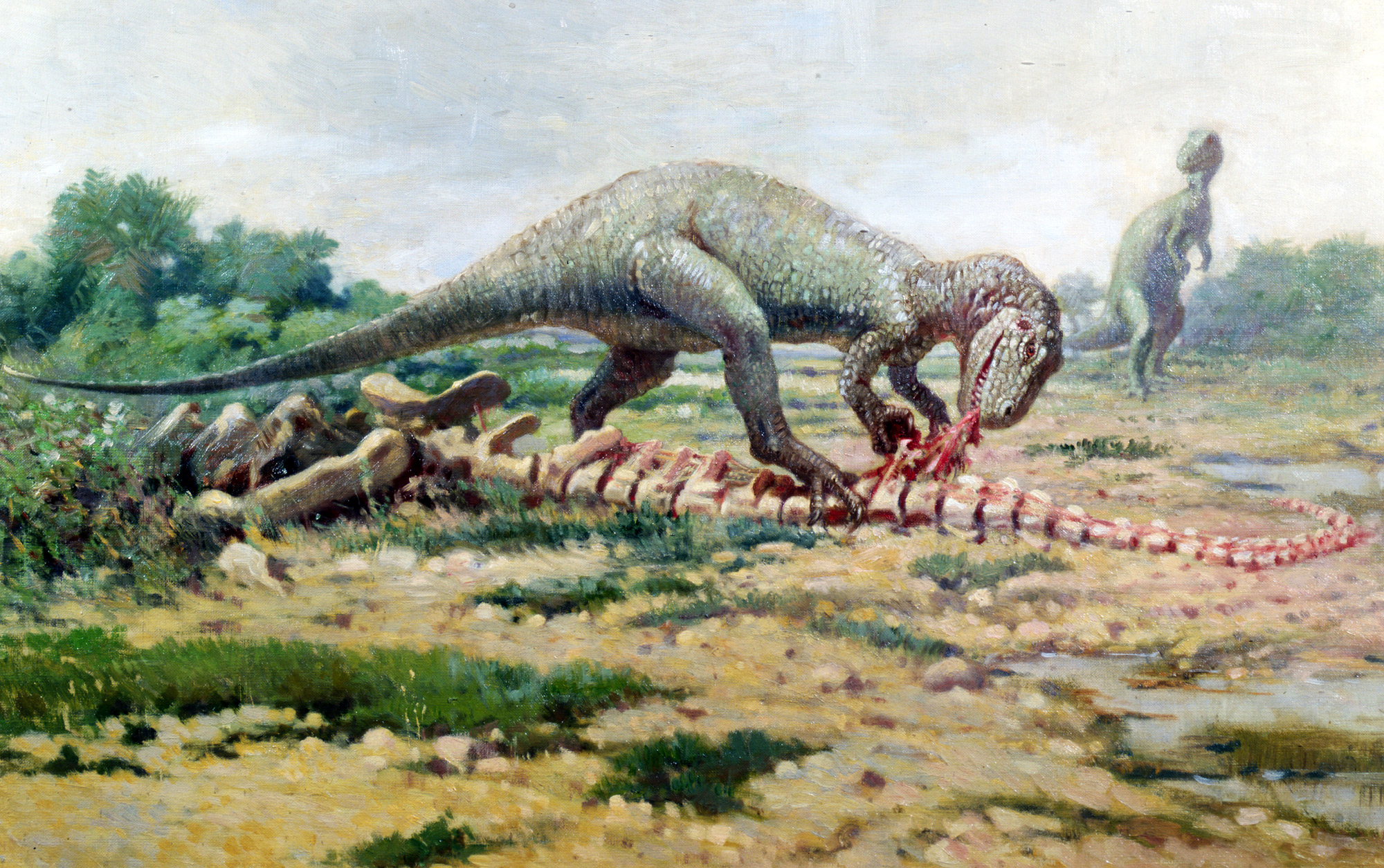
Outdated 1904 life restoration of AMNH 5753 by Charles R. Knight

The first described Allosaurus fossil was a bone obtained secondhand by Ferdinand V. Hayden in 1869 during his geological survey of Colorado. This was the first dinosaur fossil discovered in Colorado, although the exact location is unknown. (Note: Leidy assumed that the fossil was from Middle Park, but it might actually have been discovered in Breckenridge or Silverthorne.) The locals had identified such bones as "petrified horse hoofs". Hayden sent his specimen to Joseph Leidy, who identified it as half of a tail vertebra and tentatively assigned it to the European dinosaur genus Poekilopleuron as Poicilopleuron [sic] valens. He later decided it deserved its own genus, Antrodemus.

Allosaurus itself is based on YPM 1930, a small collection of fragmentary bones including parts of three vertebrae, a rib fragment, a tooth, a toe bone, and the shaft of the right humerus (upper arm bone). Othniel Charles Marsh gave these remains the name Allosaurus fragilis in 1877. Allosaurus comes from the Greek words allos/αλλος, meaning "strange" or "different", and sauros/σαυρος, meaning "lizard" or "reptile". Marsh chose the name 'different lizard' because he believed that the vertebrae were different from those of other dinosaurs due to their lightweight construction. (Note: Marsh thought that the vertebrae were lightened by deep concavities in their sides, but more complete specimens have later shown that these concavities were in fact internal cavities) The species epithet fragilis is Latin for "fragile", again referring to the lightening features in the vertebrae. The bones were uncovered by two of Marsh's collectors, Benjamin Mudge and Samuel W. Williston, in the autumn of 1877 at Felch Quarry, in the Garden Park area of Colorado. Marsh and his collectors were unsatisfied with the quality of the collected fossils, so he ordered to close the quarry that same autumn. Yet, Marsh named two new dinosaurs from these remains: Diplodocus and Allosaurus. In 1883, Marsh hired the original discoverer of the quarry, Marshall P. Felch, to continue excavations. Felch's subsequent discoveries made the quarry one of the prime sites of the Morrison, and included the holotype specimens of Ceratosaurus nasicornis, Stegosaurus stenops, and a mostly complete Allosaurus skeleton (USNM 4734) that would later be selected as the neotype specimen of Allosaurus fragilis (the single specimen the species is based on, replacing the inadequate holotype).

In 1879, H. F. Hubbell, a collector of Marsh's rival Edward Drinker Cope, found a specimen in the Como Bluff area, but apparently did not mention its completeness and Cope never unpacked it. Upon unpacking it in 1903 (several years after Cope had died), it was found to be one of the most complete theropod specimens then known and the skeleton, now cataloged as AMNH 5753, was put on public view in 1908. This is the well-known mount poised over a partial Apatosaurus skeleton as if scavenging it, illustrated as such in a painting by Charles R. Knight. Although notable as the first free-standing mount of a theropod dinosaur and often illustrated and photographed, it has never been scientifically described.

=== Renaming to Antrodemus and early discoveries at Dinosaur National Monument ===
The many names coined by Cope and Marsh complicated later research, with the situation further compounded by the terse descriptions they provided. Even at the time, authors such as Samuel W. Williston suggested that too many names had been coined. For example, Williston pointed out in 1901 that Marsh had never been able to adequately distinguish Allosaurus from Creosaurus. The most influential early attempt to sort out the situation was produced by Charles W. Gilmore in 1920. He came to the conclusion that the tail vertebra named Antrodemus by Leidy was indistinguishable from those of Allosaurus and that Antrodemus should be the preferred name because, as the older name, it had priority. Antrodemus became the accepted name for this familiar genus for over 50 years, until James H. Madsen published on the Cleveland-Lloyd specimens and concluded that Allosaurus should be used because Antrodemus was based on material with poor, if any, diagnostic features and locality information. For example, the geological formation that the single bone of Antrodemus came from is unknown.

In 1909, Earl Douglass from the Carnegie Museum discovered what should later become Dinosaur National Monument in Utah. Until 1922, Douglass and his team excavated over 700,000 lb (320,000 kg) of fossils of multiple dinosaur species from a single quarry, including several Allosaurus specimens. Among these finds is CM 11844, which was collected between 1913 and 1915 and comprises much of the skeleton and a fragmentary skull. Since 1938, this skeleton is on display at the Carnegie Museum. During the summer of 1924, the University of Utah uncovered DINO 2560, the best preserved Allosaurus specimen known at that time. The skull of this particularly large individual is on exhibit at the Dinosaur National Monument.

=== Cleveland-Lloyd discoveries and "Big Al" ===
Map showing the thousands of dinosaur bones excavated at the Cleveland-Lloyd Dinosaur Quarry. Fossils of Allosaurus and other theropods are green.

Although sporadic work at what became known as Utah's Cleveland-Lloyd Dinosaur Quarry had taken place as early as 1927 and the fossil site itself was described by William L. Stokes in 1945, major operations did not begin there until 1960. Madsen led a cooperative effort between 1960 and 1965 involving nearly 40 institutions, during which thousands of bones were recovered from the site. The quarry is notable for the predominance of Allosaurus remains: the quarry preserves a minimum of 73 individual dinosaurs and at least 46 of those are A. fragilis. The great quantity of well-preserved Allosaurus remains has allowed this genus to be known in great detail, making it among the best-known of all theropods. Skeletal remains from the quarry pertain to individuals of almost all ages and sizes, from less than 1 metre (3.3 feet) to 12 metres (39 feet) long. Because its fossils are common at both this quarry and others in the state, Allosaurus was designated as the state fossil of Utah in 1988.

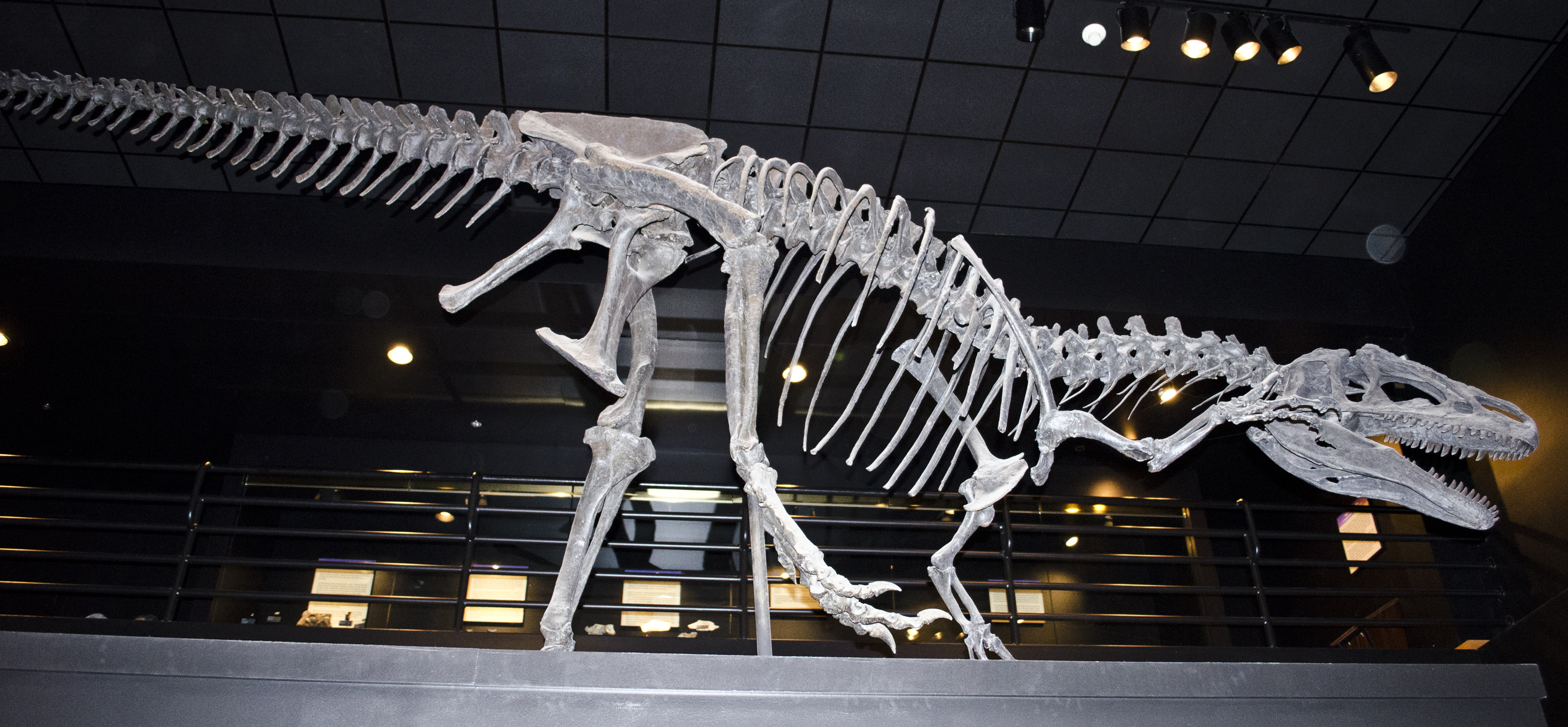
"Big Al" (A. jimmadseni) skeleton at the Museum of the Rockies

In the early 1990s, a Swiss team led by Kirby Siber set out for commercial fossil excavations at Howe Ranch Quarry, Wyoming. This quarry had originally been worked on in 1934 by Barnum Brown and his crew, who collected more than 30 tons of bones, mostly of sauropods. Because the Swiss team could not locate additional specimens in the quarry, they explored the surrounding area, where they discovered "Big Al" (MOR 693) in 1991: a 95% complete, partially articulated Allosaurus specimen. However, because the new site was located on public land, the excavation was taken over by a joint Museum of the Rockies and University of Wyoming Geological Museum team. The specimen, now on exhibit at the Museum of the Rockies, belonged to an individual of about 8 m (26 ft) in length. This was below the average size for Allosaurus, as it was a subadult estimated at only 87% grown. The Swiss team later excavated a second Allosaurus, "Big Al II" (SMA 0005), on private land on Howe Ranch, which is exhibited at the Aathal Dinosaur Museum in Switzerland.

In 1991, Brooks Britt argued that there were at least two species of Allosaurus: A robust species with a short and high skull and pointed lacrimal horns, and a more gracile species with a long and low skull and rounded lacrimal horns. The robust species is geologically younger from localities such as Dry Mesa Quarry and Garden Park, while the gracile species, found at the Cleveland-Lloyd and at Dinosaur National Monument, is older. Already in 1988, Gregory S. Paul made a similar distinction in a popular book, in which he referred to the gracile species as A. fragilis and to the robust species as A. atrox, using a species originally described by Marsh as Creosaurus atrox. However, a series of statistical analyses by David K. Smith between 1996 and 1999 suggested that the differences seen in the Morrison Formation material can be attributed to individual variation.

=== Portuguese and other European discoveries ===
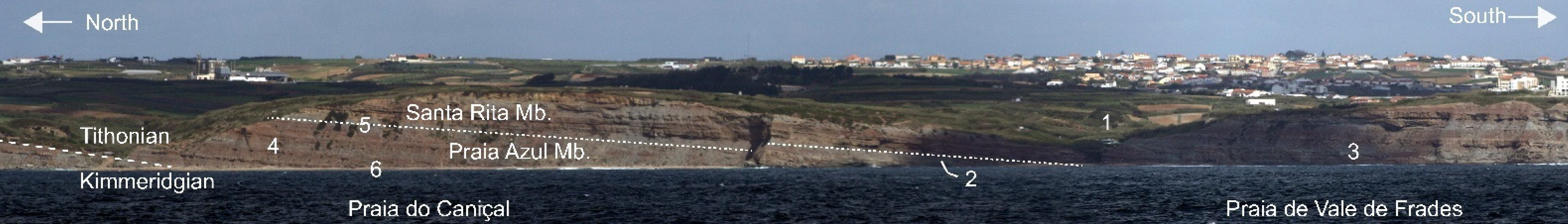
Cliffs of Lourinhã Formation outcrops, Portugal. The Vale Frades beach, where the holotype of A. europaeus was found, is labelled "2"

Allosaurus is known from at least three localities in Portugal, from rocks of the Lourinhã, Bombarral, and Alcobaça formations. The first specimen (MNHNUL/AND.001), a partial skeleton that includes an articulated hind limb and pelvis, was found in 1988 near the village of Andrés in the District of Leiria during the construction of a warehouse. Reported in 1999 and assigned to the species A. fragilis, it was the first Allosaurus specimen to be found outside of North America. A. fragilis became the first dinosaur species known from both Europe and North America, suggesting faunal exchange between the two continents. This site has been worked on again between 2005 and 2010, resulting in the discovery of at least two more Allosaurus individuals, including many skull bones. In 2005, a single maxilla was reported from the Guimarota coal mine, a locality well-known for its fossils of Mesozoic mammals; this fossil was assigned to Allosaurus but not to any particular species.

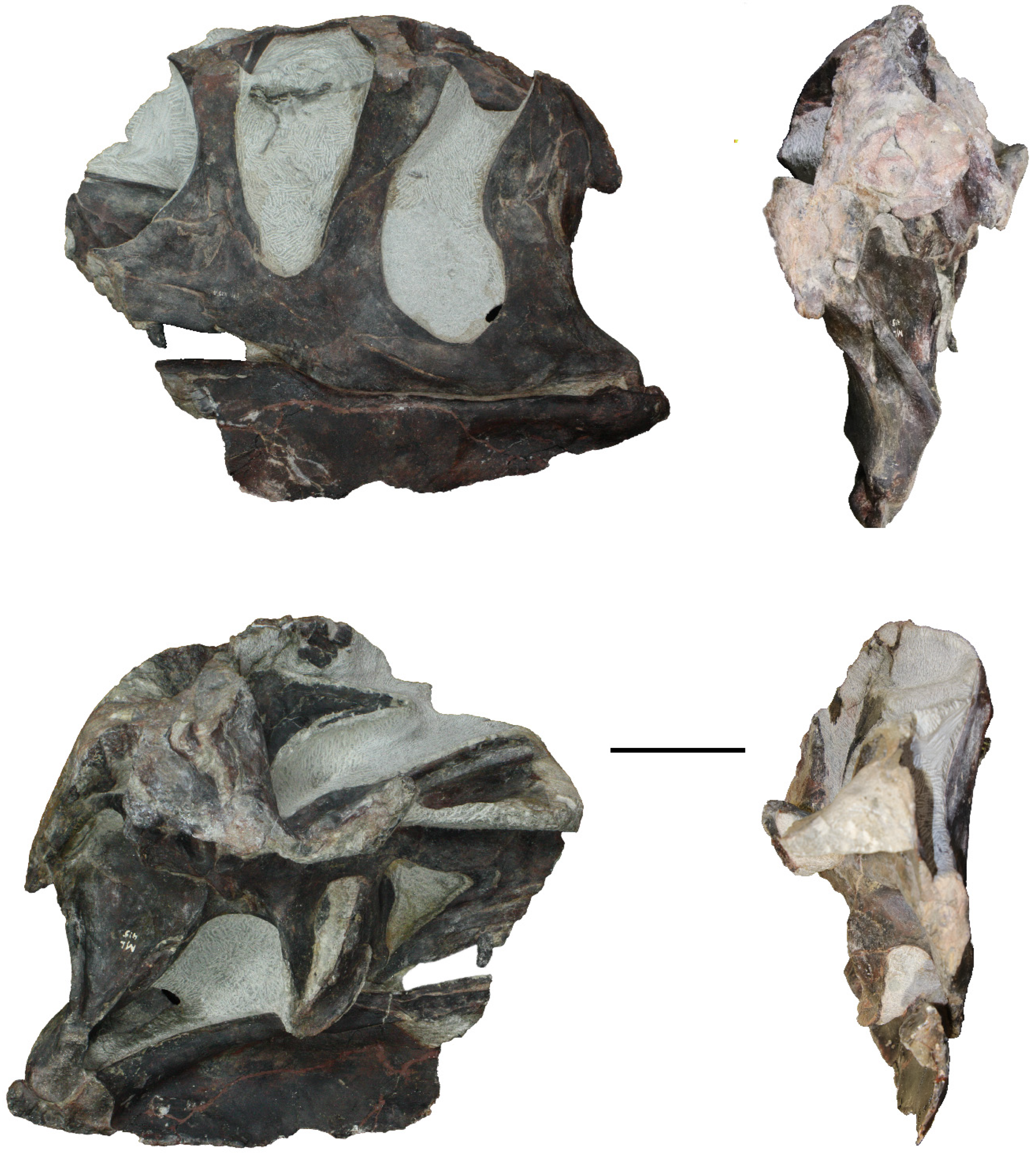
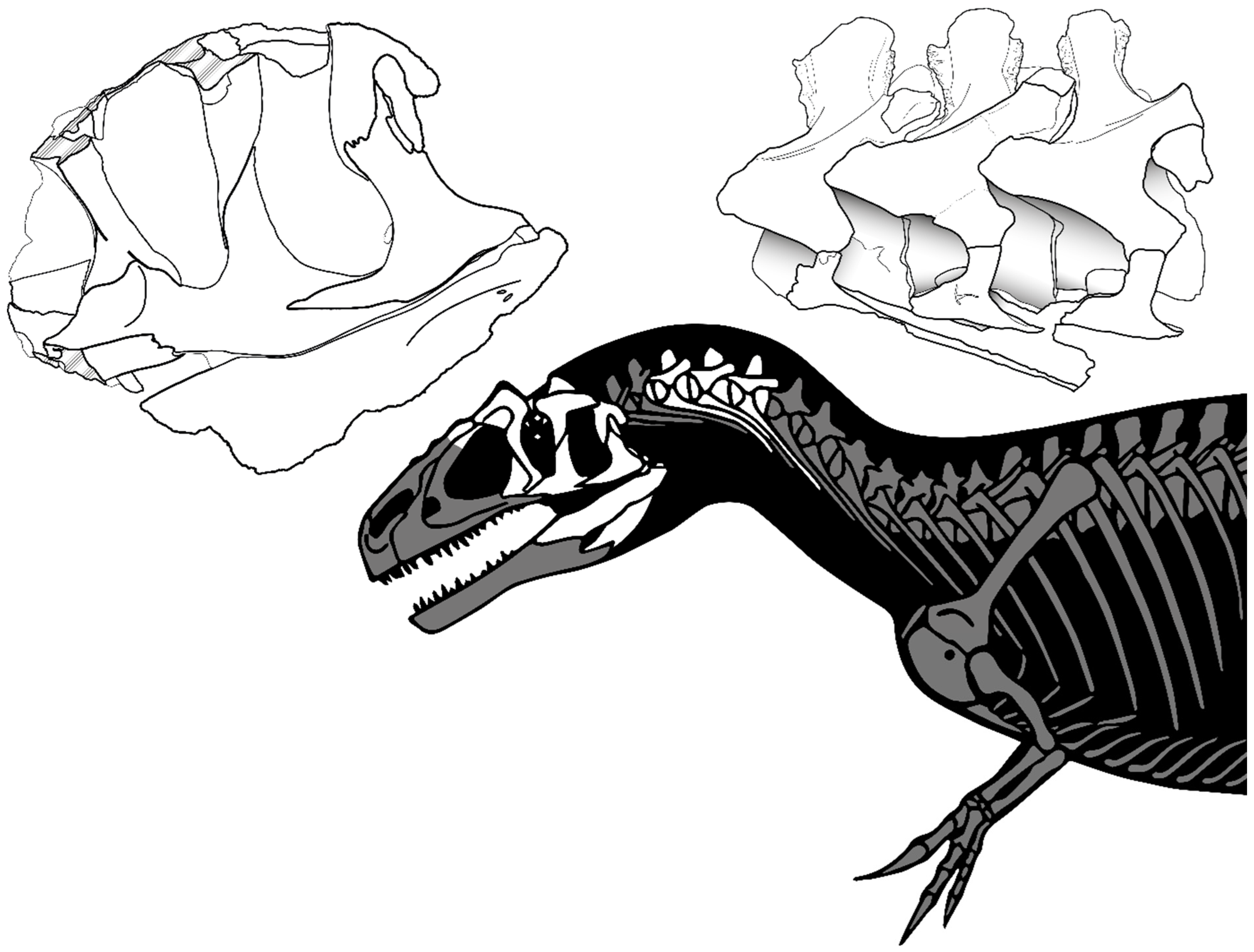
A. europaeus holotype skull with diagram showing preserved elements

In 2006, Octávio Mateus and colleagues reported a partial skull and three neck vertebrae (ML 415) from the Vale Frades beach in Lourinhã. As this specimen differed from North American Allosaurus fossils, they assigned it to a new species, A. europaeus. These authors also assigned the Andrés specimen to this species, though solely based on the fact that it was found in Portugal. The presence of a separate Allosaurus species in Europe would suggest that faunal interchange between the continents was interrupted, possibly due to the opening of the Atlantic Ocean. The status of A. europaeus was controversially discussed in the subsequent years, with different studies arguing that the species is a synonym of A. fragilis, a nomen dubium (doubtful name), or in need of re-evaluation. In 2024, André Burigo and Mateus re-described the Vale Frades specimen and carried out further fossil preparation that exposed additional bones. These authors identified nine unique features supporting the validity of A. europaeus. A 2025 study by Elisabete Malafaia and colleagues described the Andrés specimens in detail, including a newly discovered set of skull bones. Their analysis of the relationships between individual Allosaurus skulls instead suggested that A. europaeus is a synonym of A. fragilis because the Andrés specimens were more closely related to some North American specimens than to the Vale Frades specimen.

=== A. jimmadseni and A. anax ===
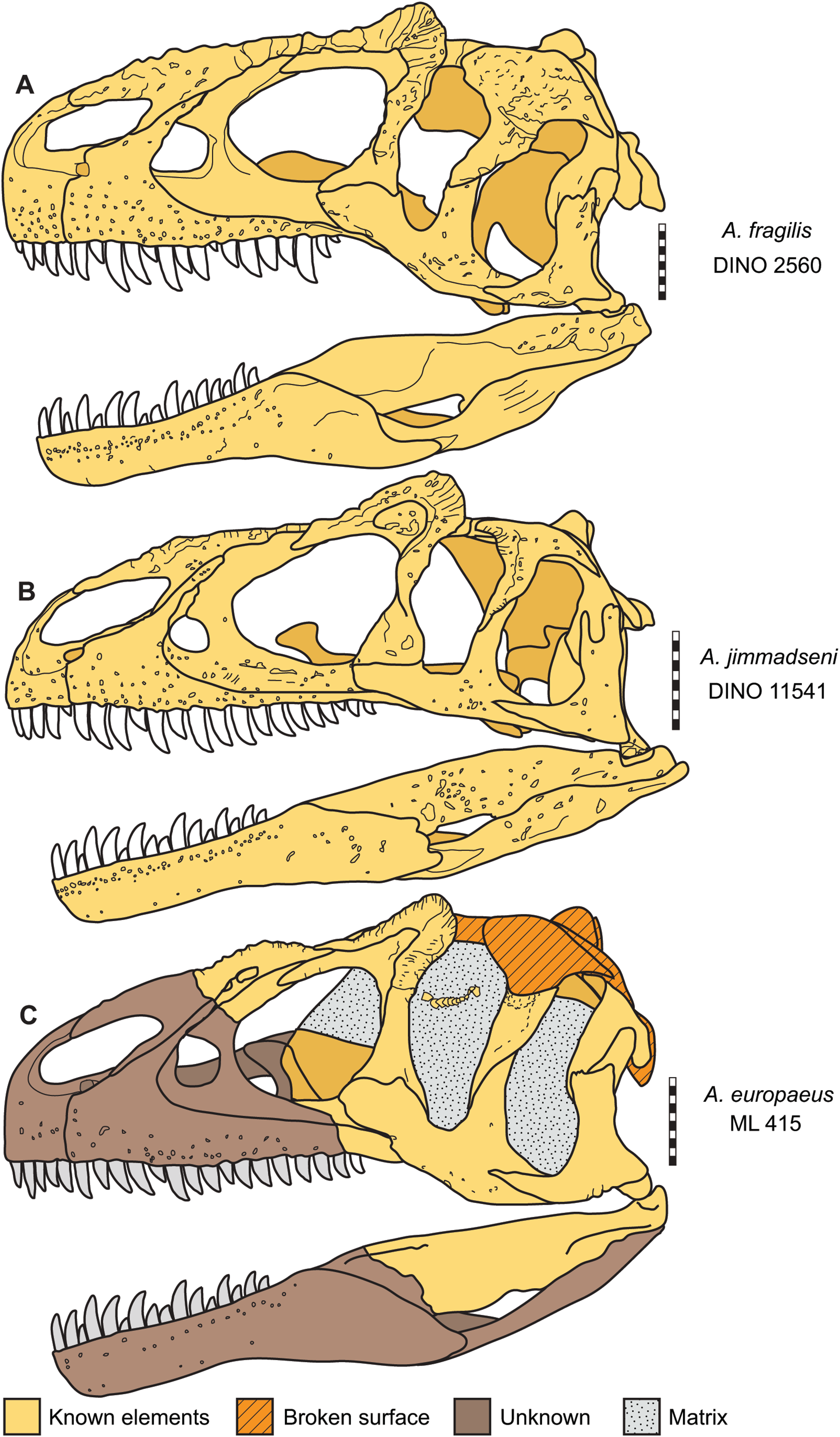
Diagram comparing skulls of three recognized species; A. fragilis (A), A. jimmadseni (B), A. europaeus (C)

On July 15, 1990, George Engelmann discovered toe bones and some tail vertebrae weathering out of the rock while conducting an inventory of fossils at Dinosaur National Monument. Staff of the National Monument began excavating the new specimen later that year; the conditions were difficult because of its location in a steeply inclined rock face that, with ongoing excavation, became vertical. In 1994, much of the excavated skeleton was flown out via helicopter in a single block weighing 2,700 kg (6,000 lb). The skull, which was still missing, was only located two years later, in 1996, with the help of novel radiological surveying techniques that detect gamma radiation from radioactive minerals which accumulate in bones during fossilization. The specimen, DINO 11541, is one of the most complete theropod skeletons recovered from the Late Jurassic. In 2000, Daniel Chure described the specimen in his PhD thesis, arguing that it represents a new species, A. jimmadseni. However, as the thesis did not meet the requirements of the International Commission on Zoological Nomenclature (ICZN), it remained an invalid nomen nudum ("naked name") until Chure and Mark Loewen formally described the species in 2020. These authors assigned several other specimens to A. jimmadseni, including the original "Big Al" individual (MOR 693). The name jimmadseni honors Madsen for his contributions to the taxonomy of the genus, notably his 1976 work.

The issue of species and potential synonyms was historically complicated by the type specimen of Allosaurus fragilis (YPM 1930) being extremely fragmentary. Because of this, several scientists have interpreted the type specimen as potentially dubious, meaning the genus Allosaurus itself or at least the species A. fragilis would be a nomen dubium ("dubious name", based on a specimen too incomplete to compare to other specimens or to classify). To address this situation, Gregory S. Paul and Kenneth Carpenter submitted a petition to the ICZN in 2010 to have the more complete specimen USNM 4734 selected as a neotype, a decision that was ratified by the ICZN on December 29, 2023. In 2014, Sebastian Dalman named the new species Allosaurus lucasi based on two specimens from the Tithonian of Colorado, but this species was not accepted by later authors.

In 1995, Chure created the taxon Saurophaganax maximus for giant allosaurid remains from western Oklahoma. These remains had been known as Saurophagus, but that name was already in use, leading Chure to propose a substitute. Smith, in his 1998 analysis of variation, concluded that S. maximus was not different enough from Allosaurus to be a separate genus, but did warrant its own species, A. maximus. This reassignment was rejected in a review of basal tetanurans. A 2024 reassessment by Andy Danison and colleagues suggested that the Saurophaganax specimen is a chimera that combines the bones of Allosaurus with those of a sauropod. The holotype of Saurophaganax itself, a neural arch, cannot be confidently assigned to a theropod, making it a nomen dubium. The Allosaurus bones, however, were found to be distinct enough to warrant a new species of Allosaurus, A. anax. The name anax is Greek for 'king', and also alludes to the name change from Saurophagus to Saurophaganax.

== Description ==
The size range of Allosaurus compared with a human

Allosaurus was a typical large theropod, having a massive skull on a short neck, a long, slightly sloping tail, and reduced forelimbs. The size of A. fragilis, the best-known species, has been estimated at 7–9 m (23–30 ft) and its mass at 1.7–2.7 t (1.9–3.0 short tons). In his 1976 monograph on Allosaurus, James H. Madsen mentioned a range of bone sizes which he interpreted to show a maximum length of 12 to 13 m (39 to 43 ft). As with dinosaurs in general, weight estimates are debatable, and since 1980 have ranged between 1 and 4 t (1.1 and 4.4 short tons) for modal adult weight (not maximum). John Foster, a specialist on the Morrison Formation, suggests that 1 t (1.1 short tons) is reasonable for large adults of A. fragilis, but that 700 kg (1,500 lb) is a closer estimate for average individuals. Using the subadult specimen nicknamed "Big Al", since assigned to the species Allosaurus jimmadseni, researchers using computer modeling arrived at a best estimate of 1.5 t (1.7 short tons) for the individual, but by varying parameters they found a range from approximately 1.4–2 t (1.5–2.2 short tons). A. jimmadseni is estimated to have been 7.6 metres (25 ft) in length. A separate computational project estimated the adaptive optimum body mass in Allosaurus to be 2.3 t (2.5 short tons). A. europaeus has been measured up to 6–8 m (20–26 ft) in length and 1 t (1.1 short tons) in body mass. The maxilla of one European specimen of Allosaurus is similar in length to large North American Allosaurus specimens.

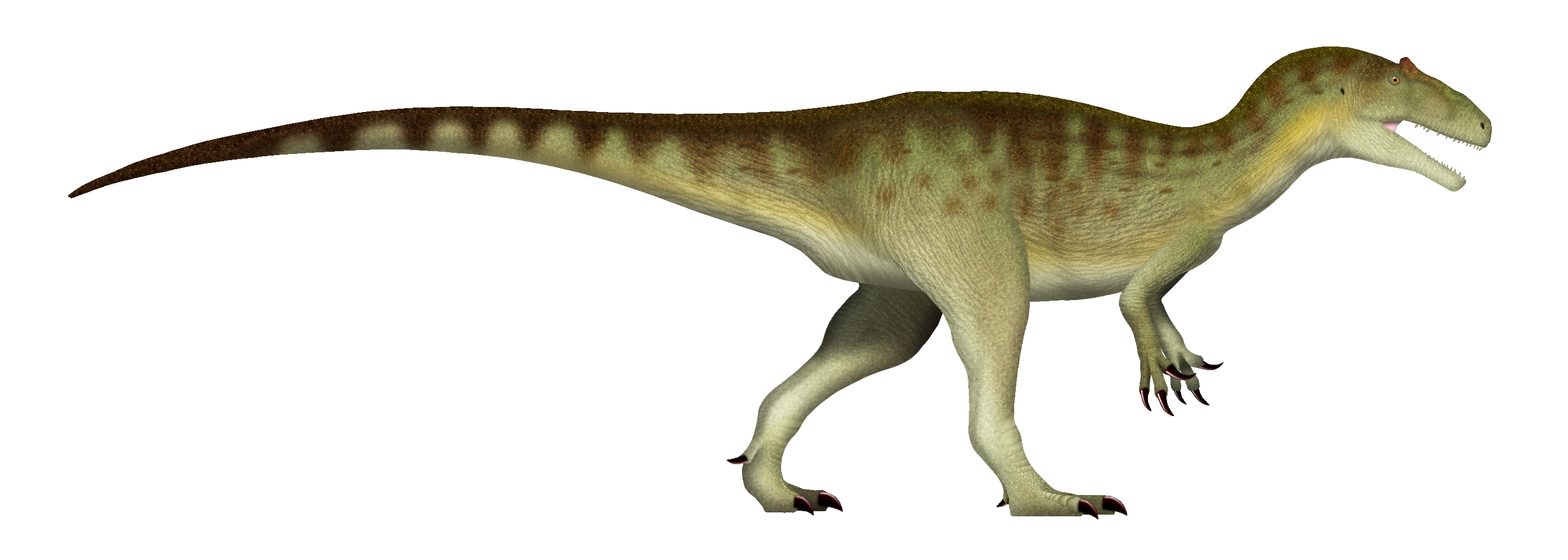
Life restoration of A. jimmadseni

Several gigantic specimens have been attributed to Allosaurus, but may in fact belong to other genera. The dubious genus Saurophaganax (OMNH 1708) was estimated to reach around 10.5 m (34 ft) in length, and its single species has sometimes been included in the genus Allosaurus as A. maximus. However, a 2024 study questioned the referral of materials beyond the holotype to Saurophaganax, with the material they could confidently assign to Allosauridae belonging to the new species Allosaurus anax. The body mass of this species was estimated around 3.8–4.6 metric tons (4.2–5.1 short tons) based on fragmentary material. Another potential specimen of Allosaurus, once assigned to the genus Epanterias (AMNH 5767), may have measured 12.1 m (40 ft) in length. A more recent discovery is a partial skeleton from the Peterson Quarry in Morrison rocks of New Mexico; this large allosaurid was suggested to be a potential specimen of Saurophaganax prior to this taxon's 2024 reassessment.

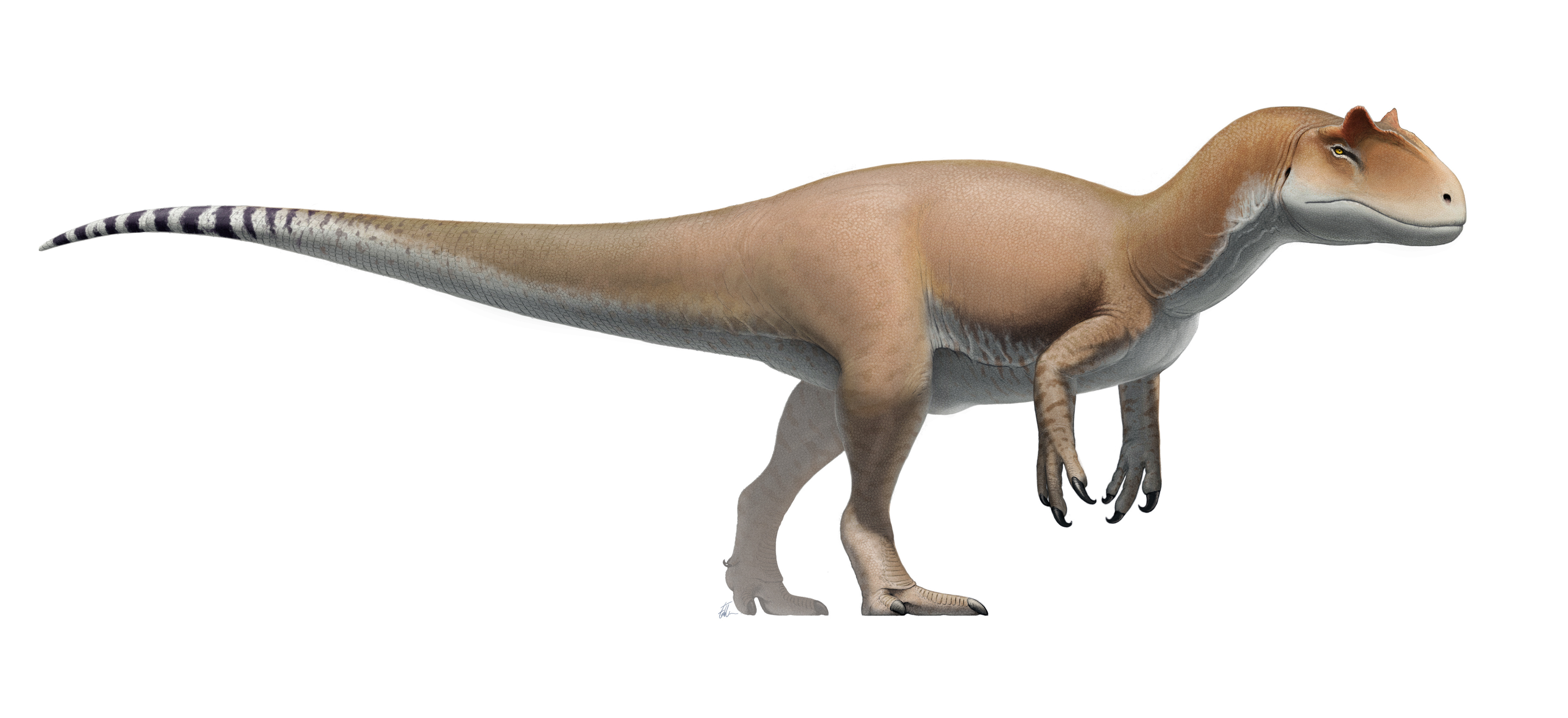
Life restoration of A. fragilis

David K. Smith, examining Allosaurus fossils by quarry, found that specimens from Utah's Cleveland-Lloyd Dinosaur Quarry are generally smaller than those from Wyoming's Como Bluff or the Dry Mesa Quarry in Colorado, but the shapes of the bones themselves did not vary between the sites. A later study by Smith incorporating specimens from the Garden Park and Dinosaur National Monument sites found no justification for multiple species based on skeletal variation; skull variation was most common and was gradational, suggesting individual variation was responsible. Further work on size-related variation again found no consistent differences, although the Dry Mesa material tended to clump together on the basis of the astragalus, an ankle bone. Kenneth Carpenter, using skull elements from the Cleveland-Lloyd site, found wide variation between individuals, calling into question previous species-level distinctions based on such features as the shape of the horns, and the proposed differentiation of A. jimmadseni based on the shape of the jugal.

=== Skull ===
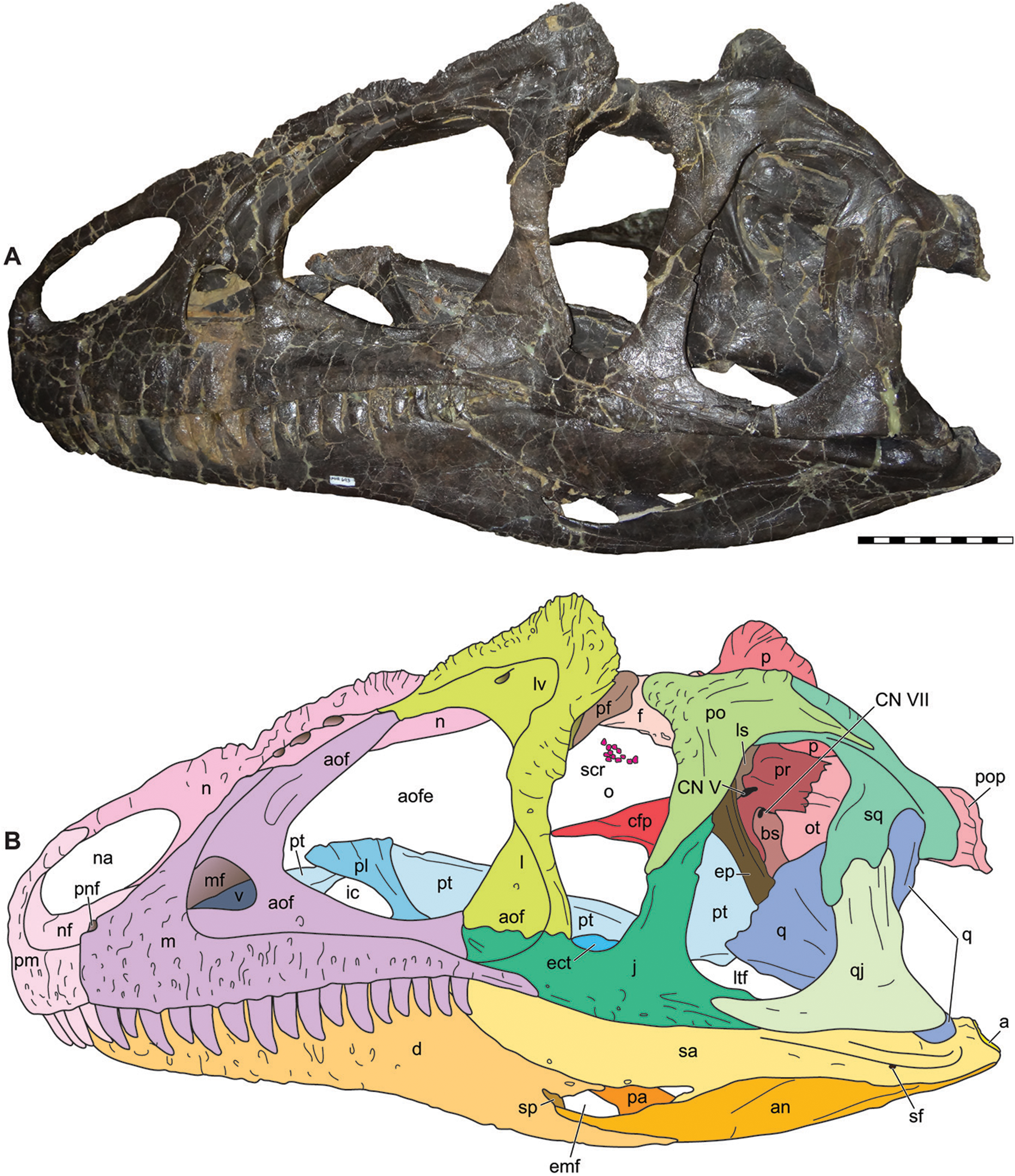
A. jimmadseni skull with diagram highlighting individual bones

The skull of Allosaurus was light and equipped with dozens of sharp, serrated teeth, and both were modestly proportioned for a theropod of its size. Paleontologist Gregory S. Paul gives a length of 845 mm (33.3 in) for a skull belonging to an individual he estimates at 7.9 m (26 ft) long. Each premaxilla (the bones that formed the tip of the snout) held five teeth with D-shaped cross-sections, and each maxilla (the main tooth-bearing bones in the upper jaw) had between 14 and 17 teeth; the number of teeth does not exactly correspond to the size of the bone. Each dentary (the tooth-bearing bone of the lower jaw) had between 14 and 17 teeth, with an average count of 16. The teeth became shorter, narrower, and more curved toward the back of the skull. All of the teeth had saw-like edges. They were shed easily and continually replaced, making them common fossils.

The lacrimal bones of Allosaurus extend above and in front of the eyes to form a pair of horns which varied in shape and size. Leading into the horns, the skull also features a pair of ridges running along the top of the nasal bones. The horns were probably covered in a keratin sheath and may have had a variety of functions, including acting as sunshades for the eyes, being used for display, and being used in combat against other members of the same species (although they were fragile). There was a ridge along the back of the skull roof for muscle attachment, as is also seen in tyrannosaurids.

Inside the lacrimal bones were depressions that may have held glands, such as salt glands. Within the maxillae were sinuses that were better developed than those of more basal theropods such as Ceratosaurus and Marshosaurus; they may have been related to the sense of smell, perhaps holding something like Jacobson's organs. The roof of the braincase was thin, perhaps to improve thermoregulation for the brain. The skull and lower jaws had joints that permitted motion within these units. In the lower jaws, the bones of the front and back halves loosely articulated, permitting the jaws to bow outward and increasing the animal's gape. The braincase and frontals may also have had a joint.

=== Postcranial skeleton ===
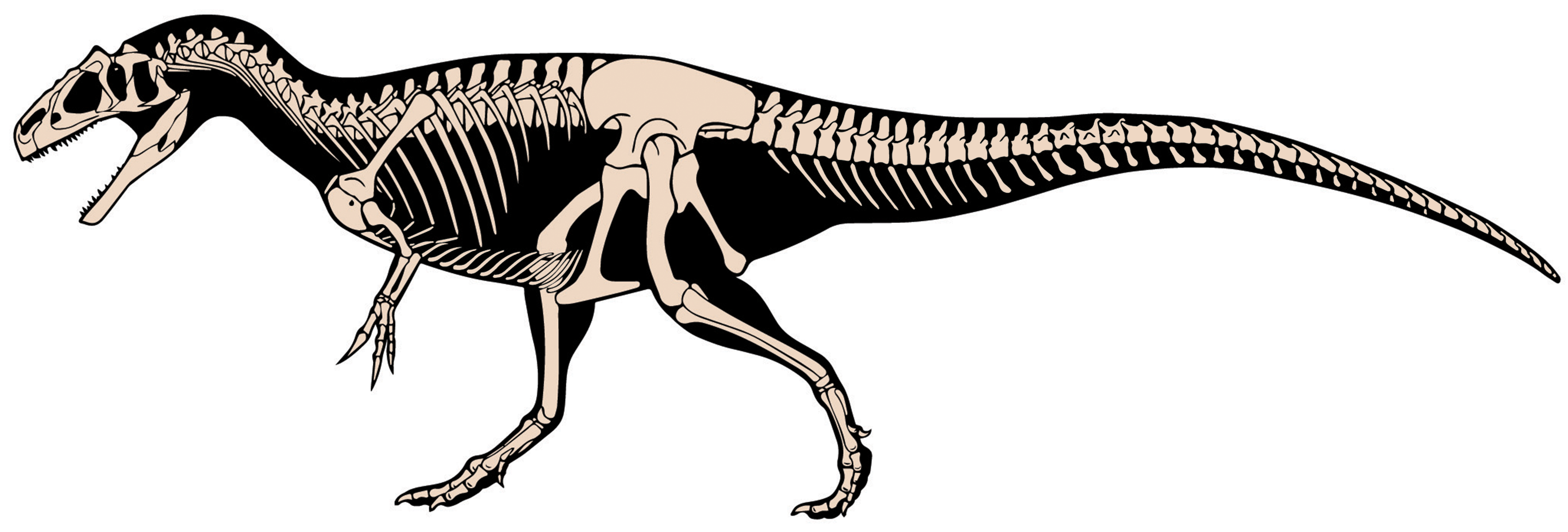
A. jimmadseni skeletal reconstruction

Allosaurus has nine vertebrae in the neck, 14 in the back, and five in the sacrum supporting the hips. (Note: Madsen, 1976; note that not everyone agrees on where the neck ends and the back begins, and some authors such as Gregory S. Paul interpret the count as 10 neck and 13 back vertebrae.) The number of tail vertebrae is unknown and varied with individual size; James Madsen estimated about 50, while Gregory S. Paul considered that to be too many and suggested 45 or less. The caudofemoralis longus muscle is reconstructed as similar in extent to other large tetanurans, and ended somewhere between the 23rd and 32nd tail vertebrae. There are hollow spaces in the neck and anterior back vertebrae. Such spaces, which are also found in modern theropods (that is, the birds), are interpreted as having held air sacs used in respiration. The rib cage is broad, giving it a barrel chest, especially in comparison to less derived theropods like Ceratosaurus. Allosaurus has gastralia (belly ribs), but these are not commonly found, and they may have ossified poorly. In one published case, the gastralia show evidence of injury during life. A furcula (wishbone) is also present, but has only been recognized since 1996; in some cases furculae were confused with gastralia. The ilium, the main hip bone, is massive, and the pubic bone has a prominent foot that may have been used for both muscle attachment and as a prop for resting the body on the ground. Madsen noted that in about half of the individuals from the Cleveland-Lloyd Dinosaur Quarry, independent of size, the pubes had not fused to each other at their foot ends. He suggested that this was a sexual characteristic, with females lacking fused bones to make egg-laying easier. This proposal has not attracted further attention, however.

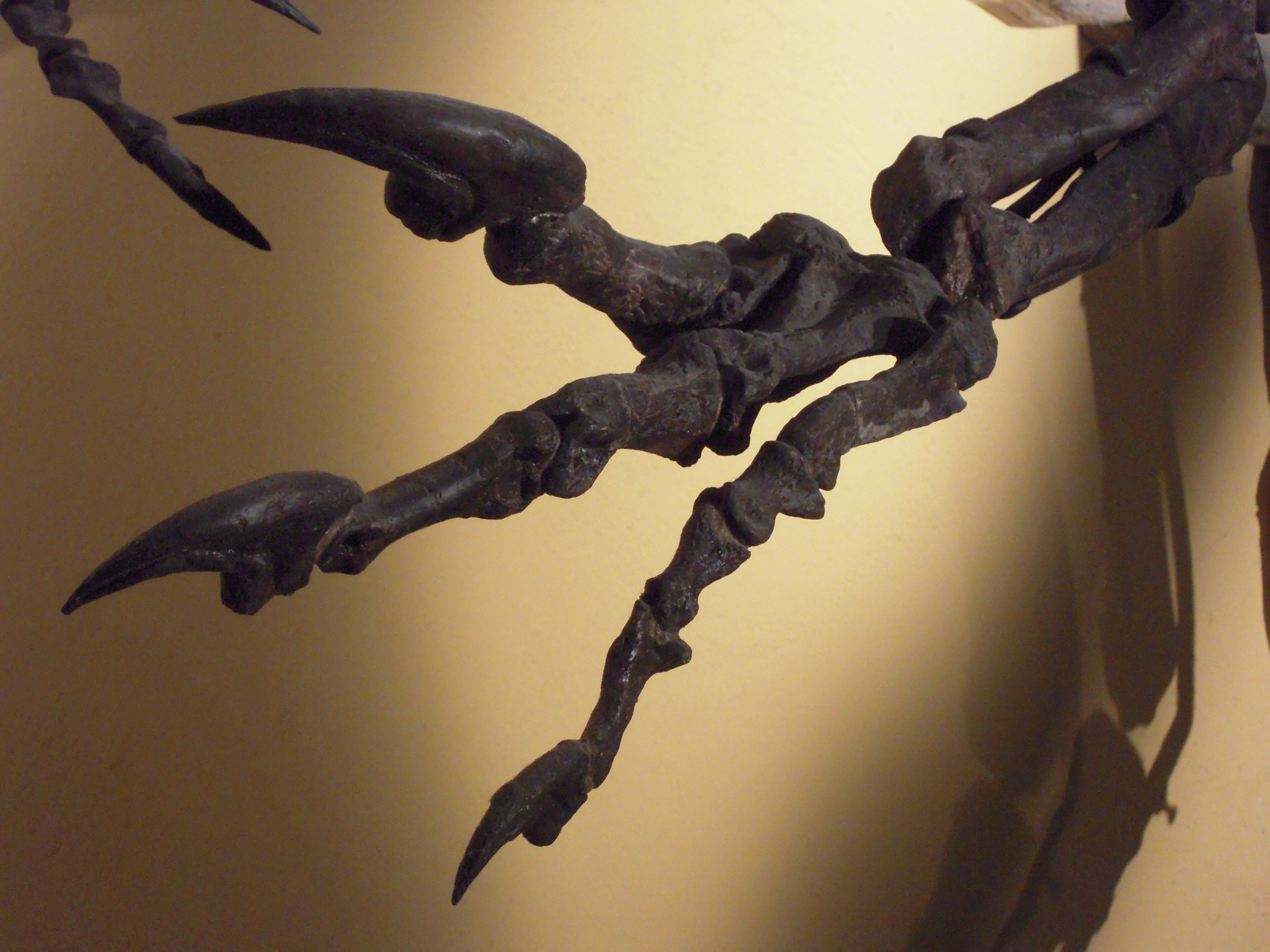
Hand and claws of A. fragilis

The forelimbs of Allosaurus are short in comparison to the hindlimbs (only about 35% the length of the hindlimbs in adults) and have three fingers per hand, tipped with large, strongly curved and pointed claws. The arms were powerful, and the forearm is somewhat shorter than the upper arm (1:1.2 ulna/humerus ratio). The wrist has a version of the semilunate carpal also found in more derived theropods like maniraptorans. Of the three fingers, the innermost (or thumb) is the largest, and diverged from the others. The phalangeal formula is 2-3-4-0-0, meaning that the innermost digit has two bones, the next has three, and the third finger has four. The legs are not as long or suited for speed as those of tyrannosaurids, and the claws of the toes are less developed and more hoof-like than those of earlier theropods. Each foot has three weight-bearing toes and an inner dewclaw, which Madsen suggested could have been used for grasping in juveniles. There is also what is interpreted as the splint-like remnant of a fifth (outermost) metatarsal, perhaps used as a lever between the Achilles tendon and foot. A 2020 study by Motani and colleagues suggested that Allosaurus was also sexually dimorphic in the width of the femur's head against its length.

=== Skin ===
Skin impressions from Allosaurus have been described. One impression, from a juvenile specimen, measures 30 square centimeters and is associated with the anterior dorsal ribs/pectoral region. The impression shows small scales measuring 1 to 3 millimeters in diameter. A skin impression from the "Big Al Two" specimen, associated with the base of the tail, measures 20 centimeters by 20 centimeters and shows large scales measuring up to 2 centimeters in diameter. However, it has been noted that these scales are more similar to those of sauropods, and due to the presence of non-theropod remains associated with the tail of "Big Al Two" there is a possibility that this skin impression is not from Allosaurus.

Another Allosaurus fossil features a skin impression from the mandible, showing scales measuring 1 to 2 millimeters in diameter. The same fossil also preserves skin measuring 20 by 20 centimeters from the ventral side of the neck, showing scutate scales measuring 0.5 centimeters wide and 11 centimeters long. A small skin impression from an Allosaurus skull has been reported but never described. Additional undescribed skin impressions are known from various parts of the body in one specimen.

== Classification ==
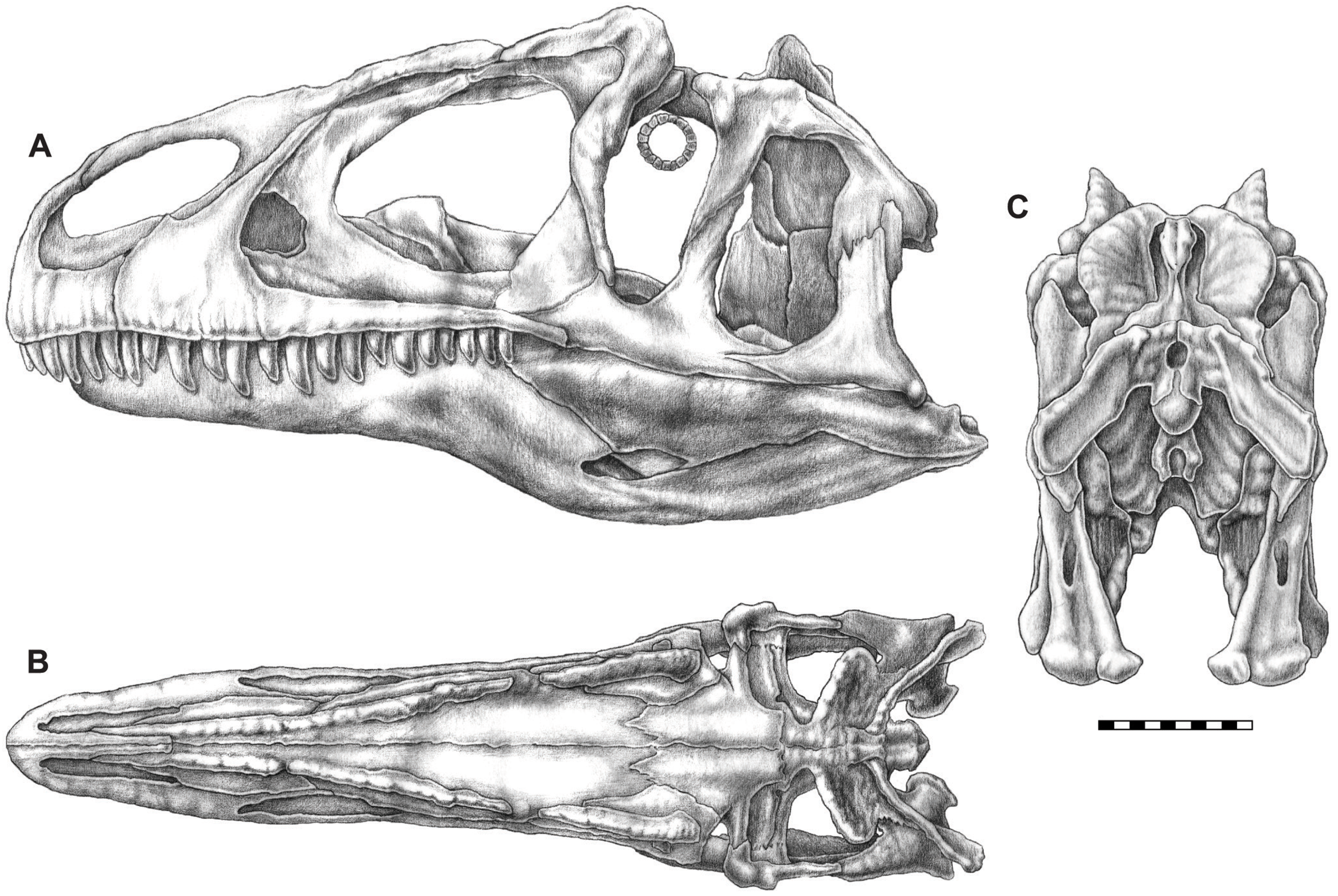
Illustrations showing the skull of A. jimmadseni from the side (A), top (B), and back (C)

Allosaurus is the eponymous member of the Allosauridae, a family that Marsh had named in 1878, one year after his description of A. fragilis. Originally, Allosauridae contained just Allosaurus itself. Marsh named two additional allosaurids in 1879 – Creosaurus and Labrosaurus – but these were later found to be synonyms of Allosaurus. In 1890, Karl Alfred von Zittel instead classified Allosaurus within the family Megalosauridae, while Marsh classified it within Dryptosauridae in 1895 and 1896. Most studies followed Zittel's classification within Megalosauridae until Madsen, in his 1976 monograph, argued that Megalosauridae has been used for any kind of carnivorous dinosaur with recurved and pointed teeth. Because Allosaurus differed from Megalosaurus in multiple aspects, Madsen argued that Allosauridae should be kept as a separate family. Some studies in the 1980s and 1990s proposed that Allosaurus was more closely related to the Tyrannosauridae than to most other theropods, but this has been rejected, with tyrannosaurids identified as members of a separate branch of theropods, the Coelurosauria. Various genera, such as Piatnitzkysaurus or Acrocanthosaurus, have been classified within Allosauridae by different authors, but two later reviews from 2004 and 2012 restricted the family to just Allosaurus and Saurophaganax. In 2024, Andy Danison and colleagues showed that Saurophaganax did not exist as a separate genus of allosaurid, as it consisted of a mixture of Allosaurus and sauropod fossils.

Together with the group Carcharodontosauria, Allosauridae is often classified within the group Allosauria. Allosauria, in turn, forms the group Allosauroidea together with the family Metriacanthosauridae in many analyses. Historically, Allosaurus has often been classified in the group Carnosauria, which originally encompassed any large theropod that was not a ceratosaur or a tyrannosaurid. Carnosauria is still sometimes used, either to encompass the groups Allosauroidea and Megalosauroidea, or as an approximate synonym of Allosauroidea. In a 1988 popular book, Gregory S. Paul used the subfamily Allosaurinae to unite the genera Allosaurus and Chilantaisaurus. This group has not been widely used. The cladogram shown below is from a 2015 study of Christophe Hendrickx and colleagues:

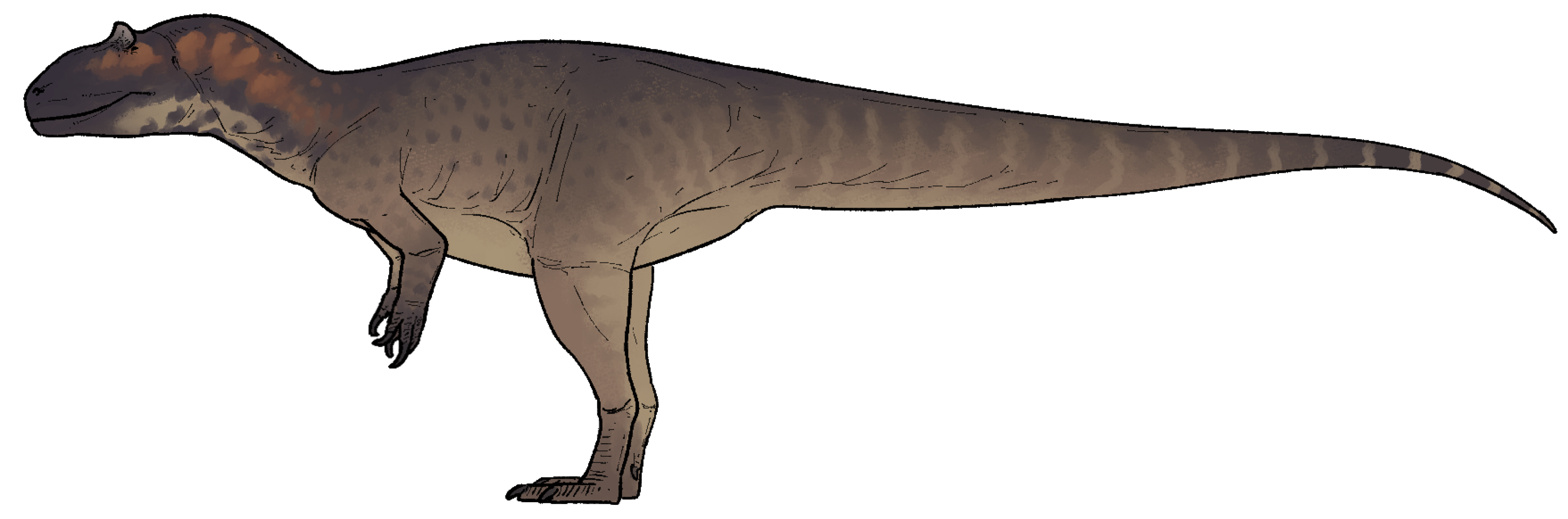
Life restoration of A. anax

- Allosauroidea
  - Metriacanthosauridae
  - Allosauria
    - Allosauridae
    - Carcharodontosauria
      - Neovenator
      - Carcharodontosauridae

== Paleobiology ==
=== Life history ===
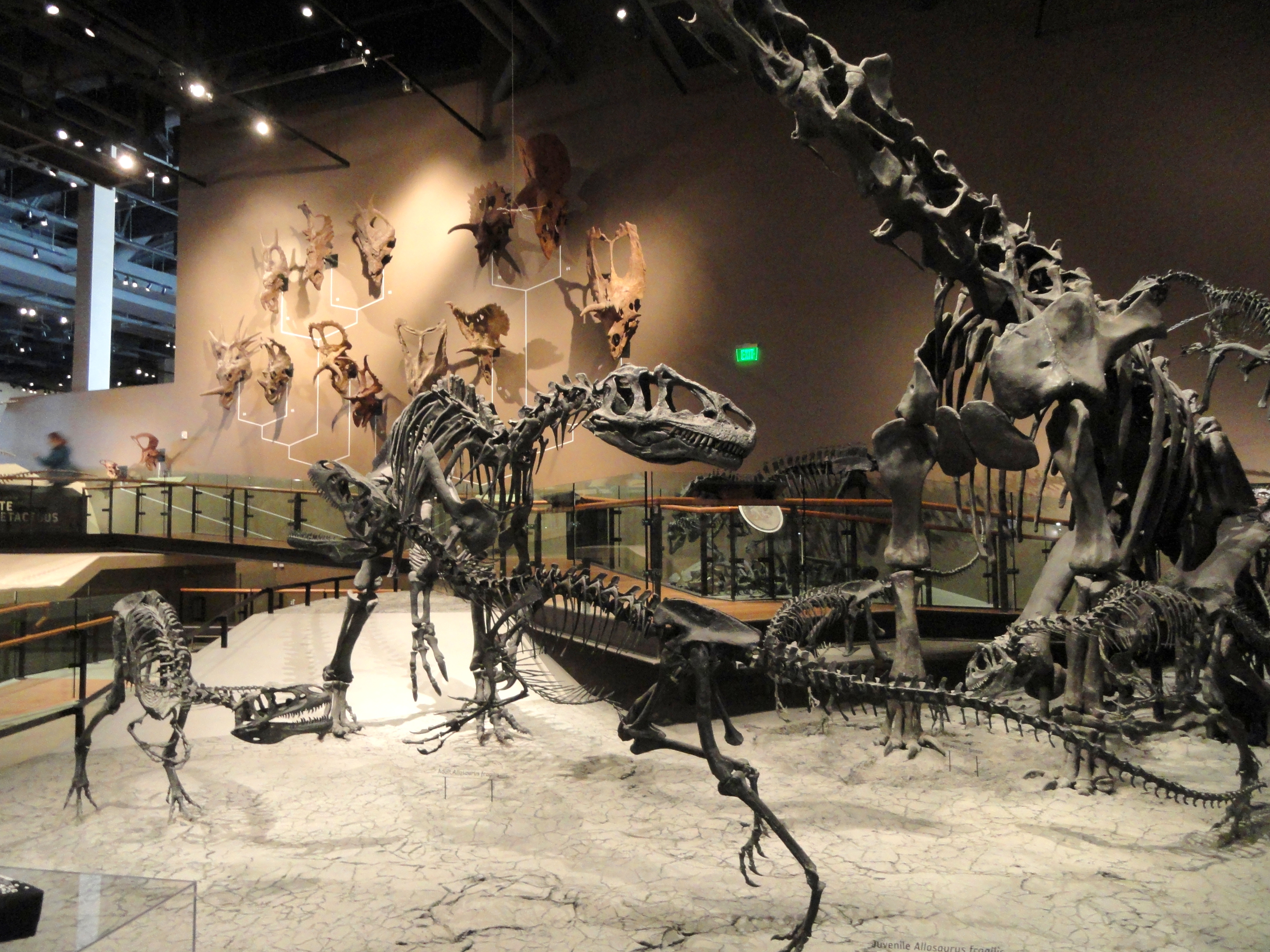
Skeletons at different growth stages on display at the Natural History Museum of Utah

The wealth of Allosaurus fossils, from nearly all ages of individuals, allows scientists to study how the animal grew and how long its lifespan may have been. Remains may reach as far back in the lifespan as eggs—crushed eggs from Colorado have been suggested as those of Allosaurus. Based on histological analysis of limb bones, bone deposition appears to stop at around 22 to 28 years, which is comparable to that of other large theropods like Tyrannosaurus. From the same analysis, its maximum growth appears to have been at age 15, with an estimated growth rate of about 148 kilograms (326 lb) per year.

Medullary bone tissue (endosteally derived, ephemeral, mineralization located inside the medulla of the long bones in gravid female birds) has been reported in at least one Allosaurus specimen, a shin bone from the Cleveland-Lloyd Quarry. Today, this bone tissue is only formed in female birds that are laying eggs, as it is used to supply calcium to shells. Its presence in the Allosaurus individual has been used to establish sex and show it had reached reproductive age. However, other studies have called into question some cases of medullary bone in dinosaurs, including this Allosaurus individual. Data from extant birds suggested that the medullary bone in this Allosaurus individual may have been the result of a bone pathology instead. However, with the confirmation of medullary tissue indicating sex in a specimen of Tyrannosaurus, it may be possible to ascertain whether or not the Allosaurus in question was indeed female.

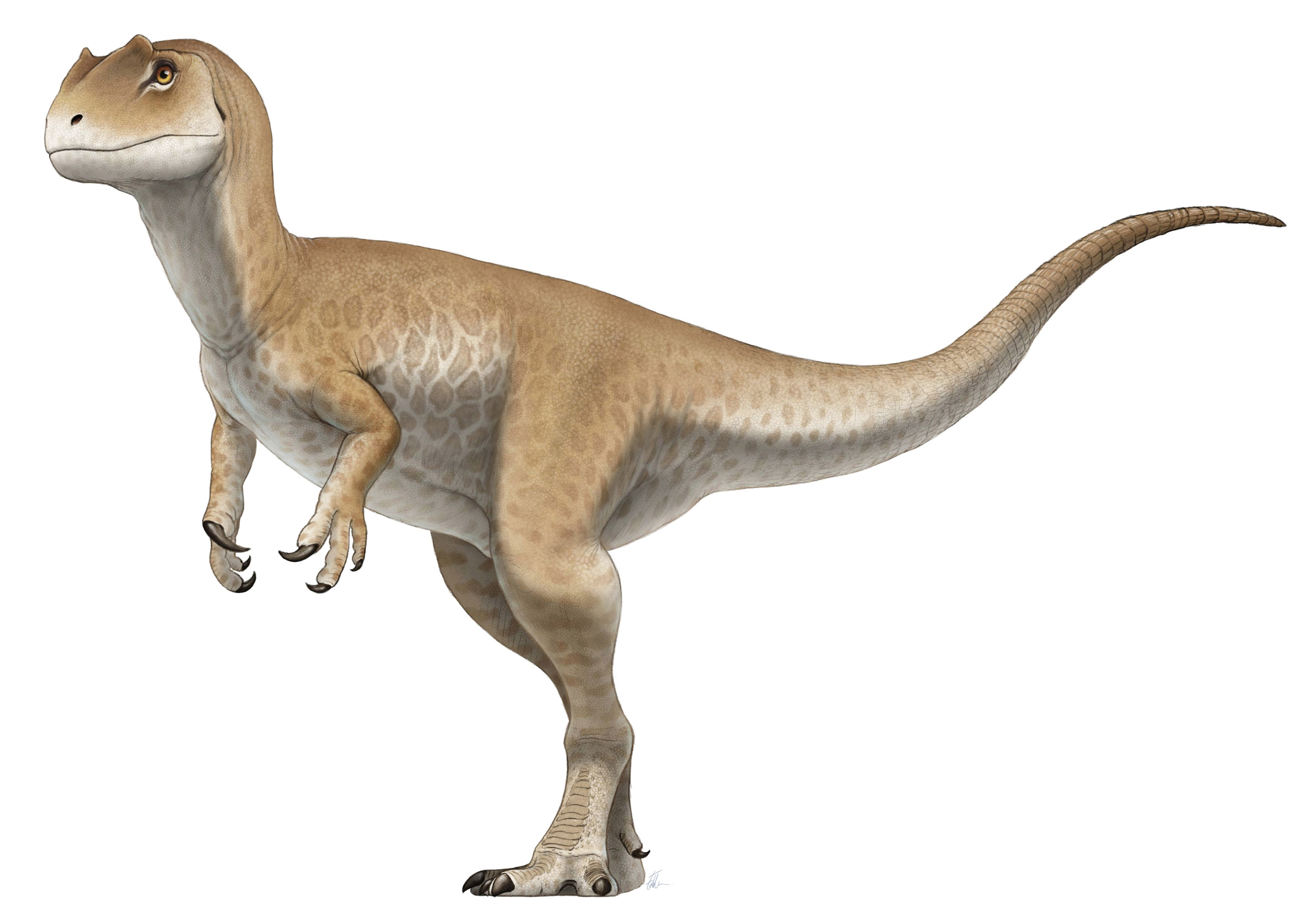
Restoration of a juvenile Allosaurus

The discovery of SDSM 30510, a juvenile specimen with a nearly complete hindlimb shows that the legs were relatively longer in juveniles, and the lower segments of the leg (shin and foot) were relatively longer than the thigh. These differences suggest that like the much later-living tyrannosaurids, younger Allosaurus were faster and filled separate predatory niches than adults, perhaps being cursorial predators of smaller prey as juveniles before becoming ambush hunters of large prey as they matured. The thigh bone became thicker and wider during growth, and the cross-section less circular, as muscle attachments shifted, muscles became shorter, and the growth of the leg slowed. These changes imply that juvenile legs had less predictable stresses compared with adults, which would have moved with more regular forward progression. Conversely, the skull bones appear to have generally grown isometrically, increasing in size without changing in proportion.

=== Feeding ===
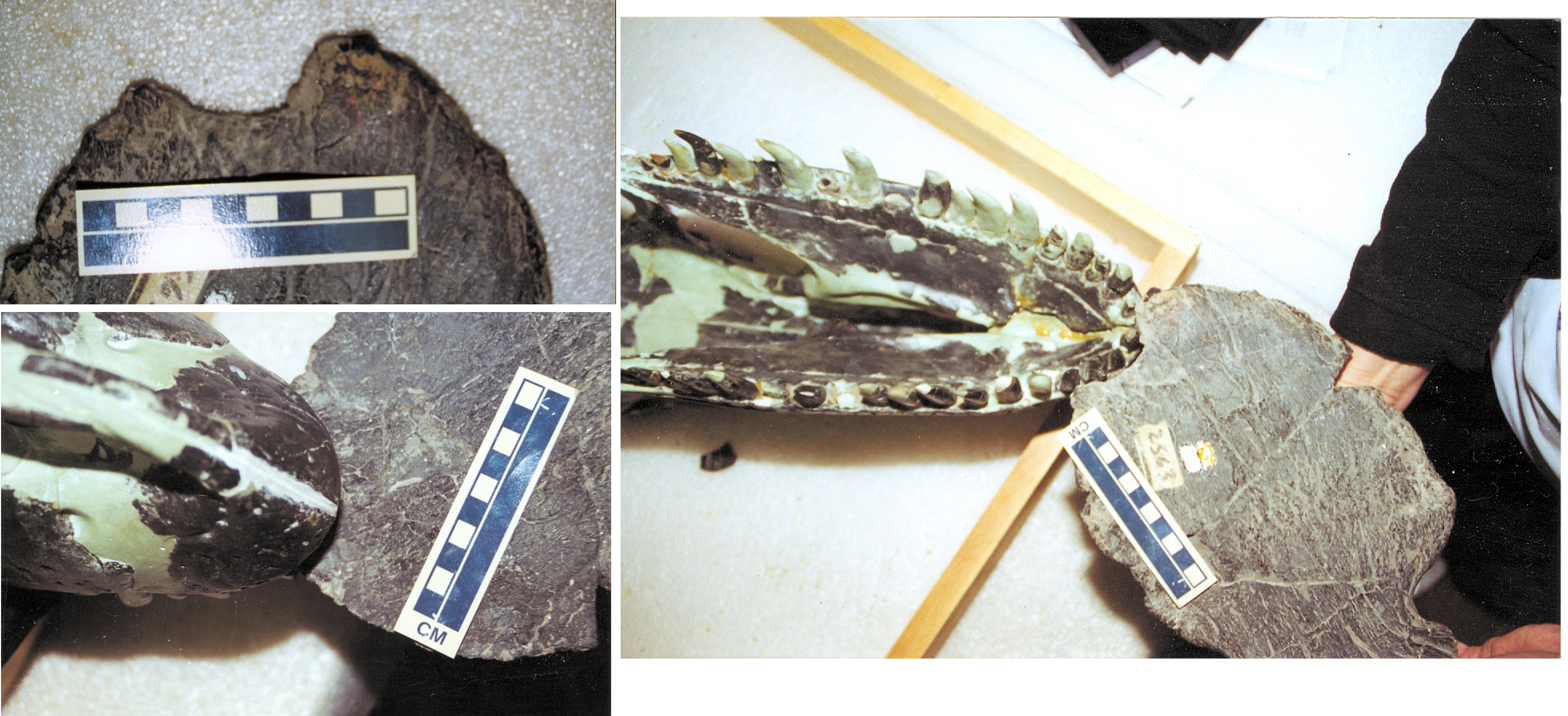
Bitten Stegosaurus plate close-up, showing how well the damage matches the front of an Allosaurus "mouth"

Most paleontologists accept Allosaurus as an active predator of large animals. There is dramatic evidence for allosaur attacks on living Stegosaurus, including an Allosaurus tail vertebra with a partially healed puncture wound that fits a Stegosaurus tail spike, and a Stegosaurus neck plate with a U-shaped wound that correlates well with an Allosaurus snout that would only have been accessible on a living animal. Sauropods seem to be likely candidates as both live prey and as objects of scavenging, based on the presence of scrapings on sauropod bones fitting allosaur teeth well and the presence of shed allosaur teeth with sauropod bones. However, as Gregory Paul noted in 1988, Allosaurus was probably not a predator of fully grown sauropods, unless it hunted in packs, as it had a modestly sized skull and relatively small teeth, and was greatly outweighed by contemporaneous sauropods. Another possibility is that it preferred to hunt juveniles instead of fully grown adults. Research in the 1990s and the first decade of the 21st century may have found other solutions to this question. Robert T. Bakker, comparing Allosaurus to Cenozoic saber-toothed carnivorous mammals, found similar adaptations, such as a reduction of jaw muscles and increase in neck muscles, and the ability to open the jaws extremely wide. Although Allosaurus did not have saber teeth, Bakker suggested another mode of attack that would have used such neck and jaw adaptations: the short teeth in effect became small serrations on a saw-like cutting edge running the length of the upper jaw, which would have been driven into prey. This type of jaw would permit slashing attacks against much larger prey, with the goal of weakening the victim.

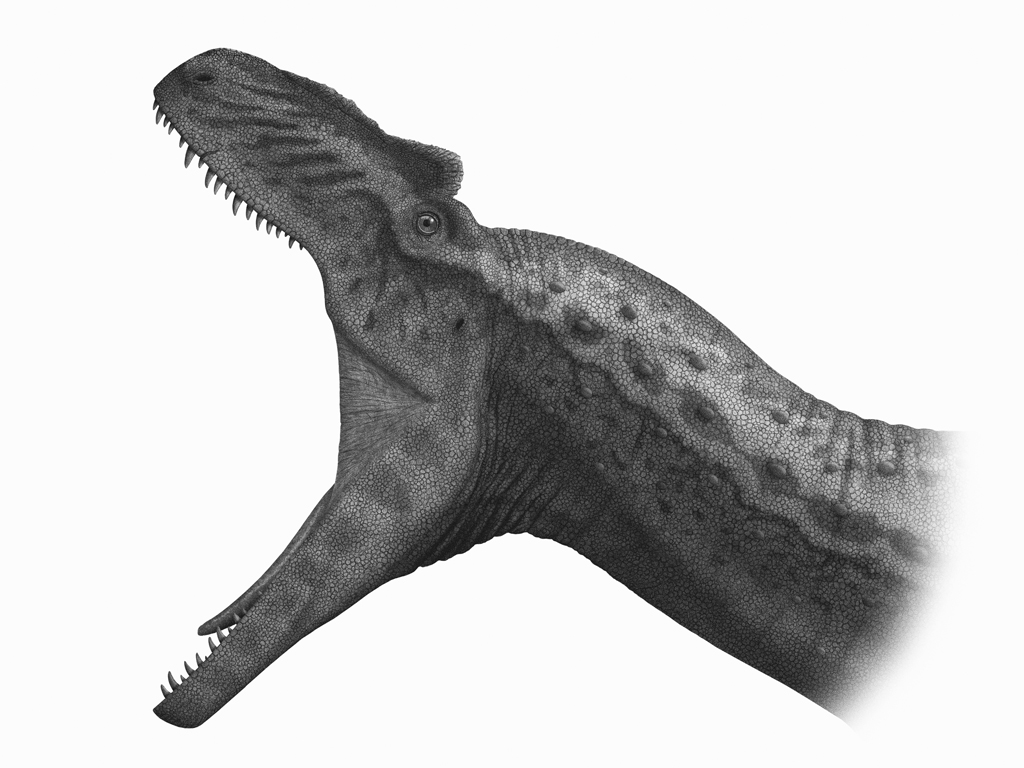
A. fragilis showing its maximum possible gape, based on Bakker (1998) and Rayfield et al. (2001)

Similar conclusions were drawn by another study using finite element analysis on an Allosaurus skull. According to their biomechanical analysis, the skull was very strong but had a relatively small bite force. By using jaw muscles only, it could produce a bite force of 805 to 8,724 N, but the skull could withstand nearly 55,500 N of vertical force against the tooth row. The authors suggested that Allosaurus used its skull like a machete against prey, attacking open-mouthed, slashing flesh with its teeth, and tearing it away without splintering bones, unlike Tyrannosaurus, which is thought to have been capable of damaging bones. They also suggested that the architecture of the skull could have permitted the use of different strategies against different prey; the skull was light enough to allow attacks on smaller and more agile ornithopods, but strong enough for high-impact ambush attacks against larger prey like stegosaurids and sauropods. Their interpretations were challenged by other researchers, who found no modern analogs to a hatchet attack and considered it more likely that the skull was strong to compensate for its open construction when absorbing the stresses from struggling prey. The original authors noted that Allosaurus itself has no modern equivalent, that the tooth row is well-suited to such an attack, and that articulations in the skull cited by their detractors as problematic actually helped protect the palate and lessen stress. Another possibility for handling large prey is that theropods like Allosaurus were "flesh grazers" which could take bites of flesh out of living sauropods that were sufficient to sustain the predator so it would not have needed to expend the effort to kill the prey outright. This strategy would also potentially have allowed the prey to recover and be fed upon in a similar way later. An additional suggestion notes that ornithopods were the most common available dinosaurian prey, and that Allosaurus may have subdued them by using an attack similar to that of modern big cats: grasping the prey with their forelimbs, and then making multiple bites on the throat to crush the trachea. This is compatible with other evidence that the forelimbs were strong and capable of restraining prey. Studies done by Stephen Lautenschager et al. from the University of Bristol also indicate Allosaurus could open its jaws quite wide and sustain considerable muscle force. When compared with Tyrannosaurus and the therizinosaurid Erlikosaurus in the same study, it was found that Allosaurus had a wider gape than either; the animal was capable of opening its jaws to a 92-degree angle at maximum. The findings also indicate that large carnivorous dinosaurs, like modern carnivores, had wider jaw gapes than herbivores.

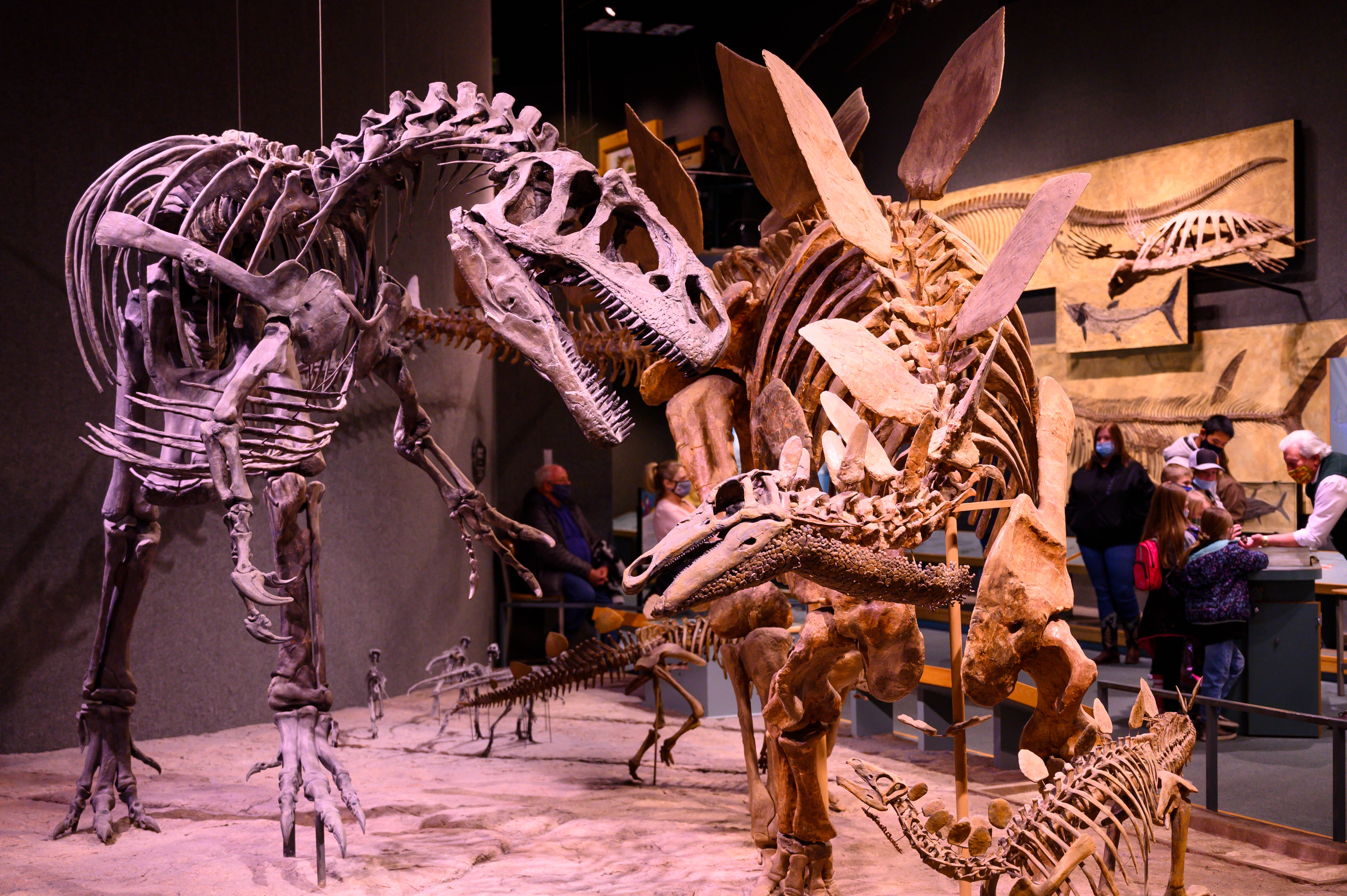
Allosaurus and Stegosaurus skeletons, the Denver Museum of Nature and Science

A biomechanical study published in 2013 by Eric Snively and colleagues found that Allosaurus had an unusually low attachment point on the skull for the longissimus capitis superficialis neck muscle compared to other theropods such as Tyrannosaurus. This would have allowed the animal to make rapid and forceful vertical movements with the skull. The authors found that vertical strikes as proposed by Bakker and Rayfield are consistent with the animal's capabilities. They also found that the animal probably processed carcasses by vertical movements in a similar manner to falcons, such as kestrels: The animal could have gripped prey with the skull and feet, then pulled back and up to remove flesh. This differs from the prey-handling envisioned for tyrannosaurids, which probably tore flesh with lateral shakes of the skull, similar to crocodilians. In addition, Allosaurus was able to "move its head and neck around relatively rapidly and with considerable control", at the cost of power.

Other aspects of feeding include the eyes, arms, and legs. The shape of the skull of Allosaurus limited potential binocular vision to 20° of width, slightly less than that of modern crocodilians. As with crocodilians, this may have been enough to judge prey distance and time attacks. The arms, compared with those of other theropods, were suited for both grasping prey at a distance or clutching it close, and the articulation of the claws suggests that they could have been used to hook things. Finally, the top speed of Allosaurus has been estimated at 30–55 km (19–34 mi) per hour.

A paper on the cranio-dental morphology of Allosaurus and how it worked has deemed the hatchet jaw attack unlikely, reinterpreting the unusually wide gape as an adaptation to allow Allosaurus to deliver a muscle-driven bite to large prey, with the weaker jaw muscles being a trade-off to allow for the widened gape.

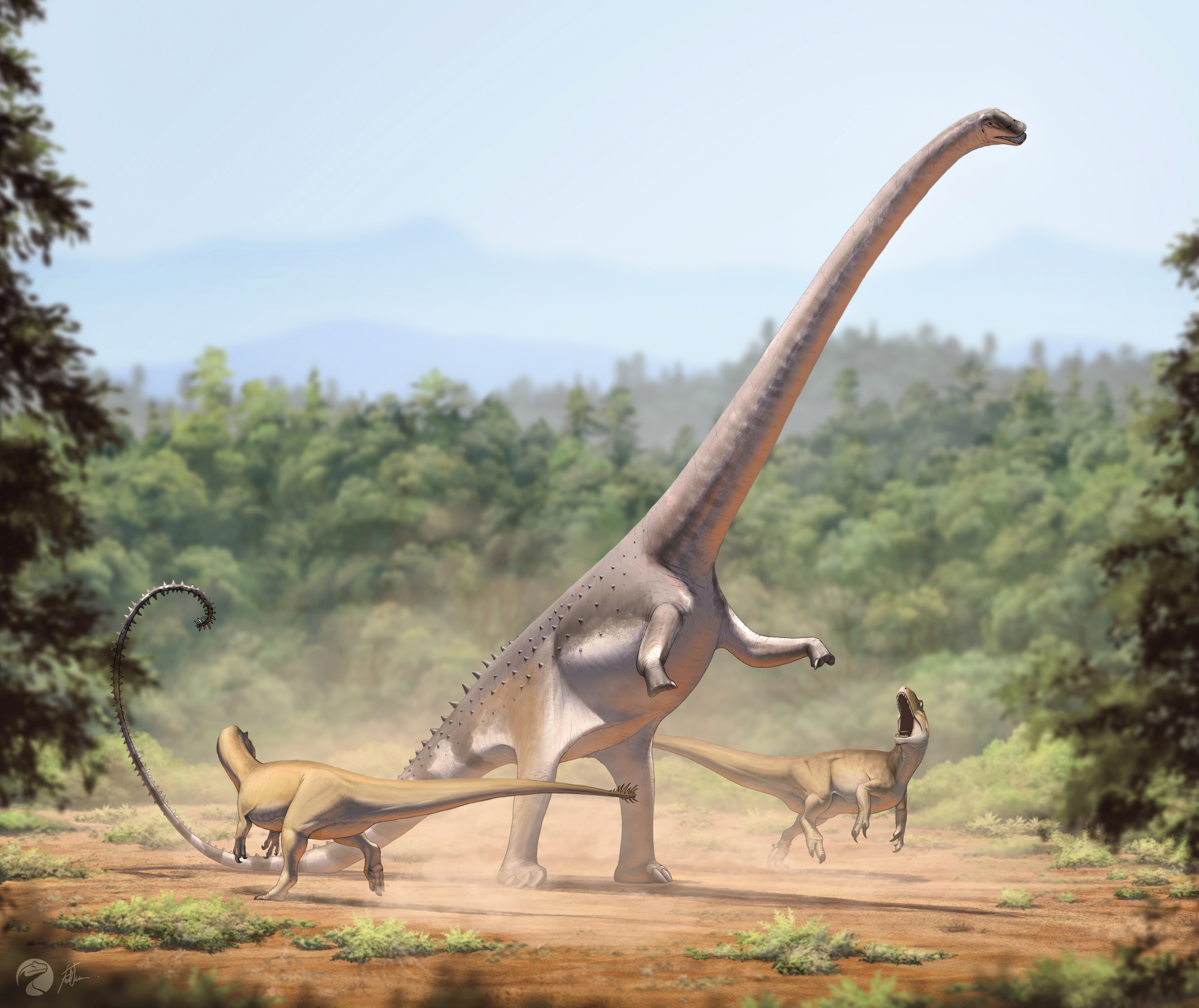
Restoration of Barosaurus rearing to defend itself against a pair of A. fragilis

Sauropod carrion may also have been important to large theropods in the Morrison Formation. Forensic techniques indicate that sauropod carcasses were targeted by Allosaurus at all stages of decomposition, indicating that late-stage decay pathogens were not a significant deterrent. A survey of sauropod bones from the Morrison Formation also reported widespread bite marks on sauropod bones in low-economy regions, which suggests that large theropods scavenged large sauropods when available, with the scarcity of such bite marks on the remains of smaller bones being potentially attributable to much more complete consumption of smaller or adolescent sauropods and on ornithischians, which would have been more commonly taken as live prey. A single dead adult Barosaurus or Brachiosaurus would have had enough calories to sustain multiple large theropods for weeks or months, though the vast majority of the Morrison's sauropod fossil record consisted of much smaller-bodied taxa such as Camarasaurus lentus or Diplodocus.

=== Social behavior ===
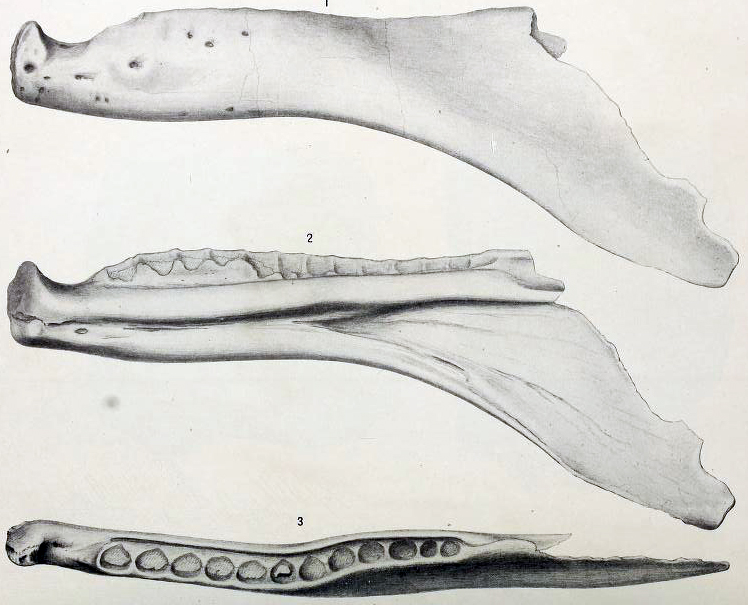
The holotype dentary of Labrosaurus ferox, which may have been injured by the bite of another A. fragilis

It has been speculated since the 1970s that Allosaurus preyed on sauropods and other large dinosaurs by hunting in groups. Such a depiction is common in semitechnical and popular dinosaur literature. Robert T. Bakker has extended social behavior to parental care, and has interpreted shed allosaur teeth and chewed bones of large prey animals as evidence that adult allosaurs brought food to lairs for their young to eat until they were grown, and prevented other carnivores from scavenging on the food. However, there is actually little evidence of gregarious behavior in theropods, and social interactions with members of the same species would have included antagonistic encounters, as shown by injuries to gastralia and bite wounds to skulls (the pathologic lower jaw named Labrosaurus ferox is one such possible example). Such head-biting may have been a way to establish dominance in a pack or to settle territorial disputes.

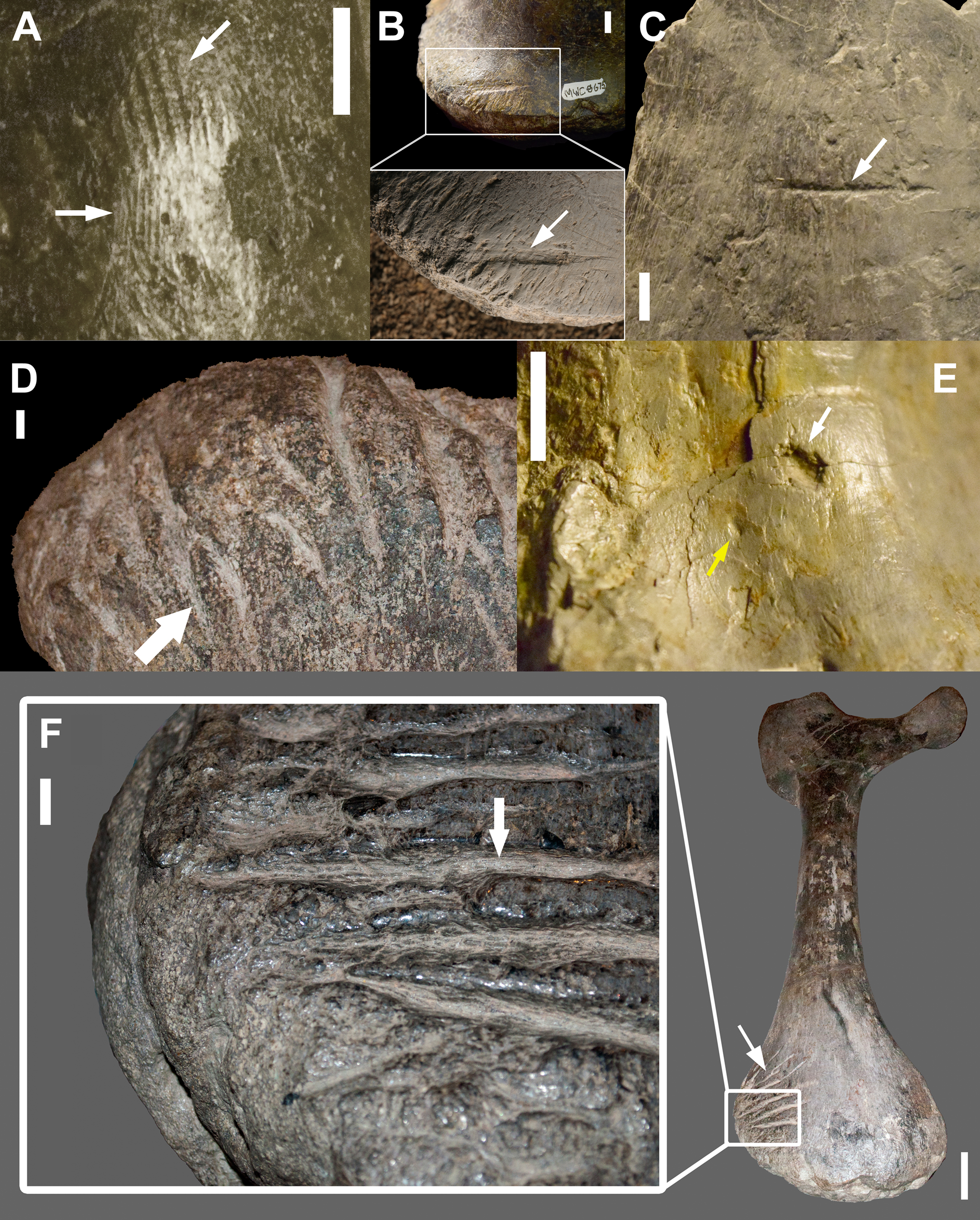
Allosaurus bite marks on Allosaurus (A, B, E) and Apatosaurus bones

Although Allosaurus may have hunted in packs, it has been argued that Allosaurus and other theropods had largely aggressive interactions instead of cooperative interactions with other members of their own species, noting that cooperative hunting of prey much larger than an individual predator, as is commonly inferred for theropod dinosaurs, is rare among vertebrates in general. According to this interpretation, the accumulation of remains of multiple Allosaurus individuals at the same site; e.g., in the Cleveland–Lloyd Quarry, are not due to pack hunting, but to the fact that Allosaurus individuals were drawn together to feed on other disabled or dead allosaurs, and were sometimes killed in the process. This could explain the high proportion of juvenile and subadult allosaurs present, as juveniles and subadults are disproportionally killed at modern group feeding sites of animals like crocodiles and Komodo dragons. The same interpretation applies to Bakker's lair sites. There is some evidence for cannibalism in Allosaurus, including Allosaurus shed teeth found among rib fragments, possible tooth marks on a shoulder blade, and cannibalized allosaur skeletons among the bones at Bakker's lair sites.

On the other hand, it has also been noted by other workers that intraspecific conflict and cannibalism have been well-documented even in highly social modern carnivores and thus cannot be used to rule out cooperative behaviors in non-avian theropods, while the traditional view of cooperative hunting being largely restricted to mammals and being relatively rare in modern diapsid carnivores (including lizards, crocodiles, and birds) has come into question as a result of more recent research, suggesting that true cooperative hunting was possible even in the most basal non-avian theropods. Pathological analysis done by Foth et al. argued that evidence of surviving serious injuries may support gregariousness in Allosaurus.

=== Brain and senses ===
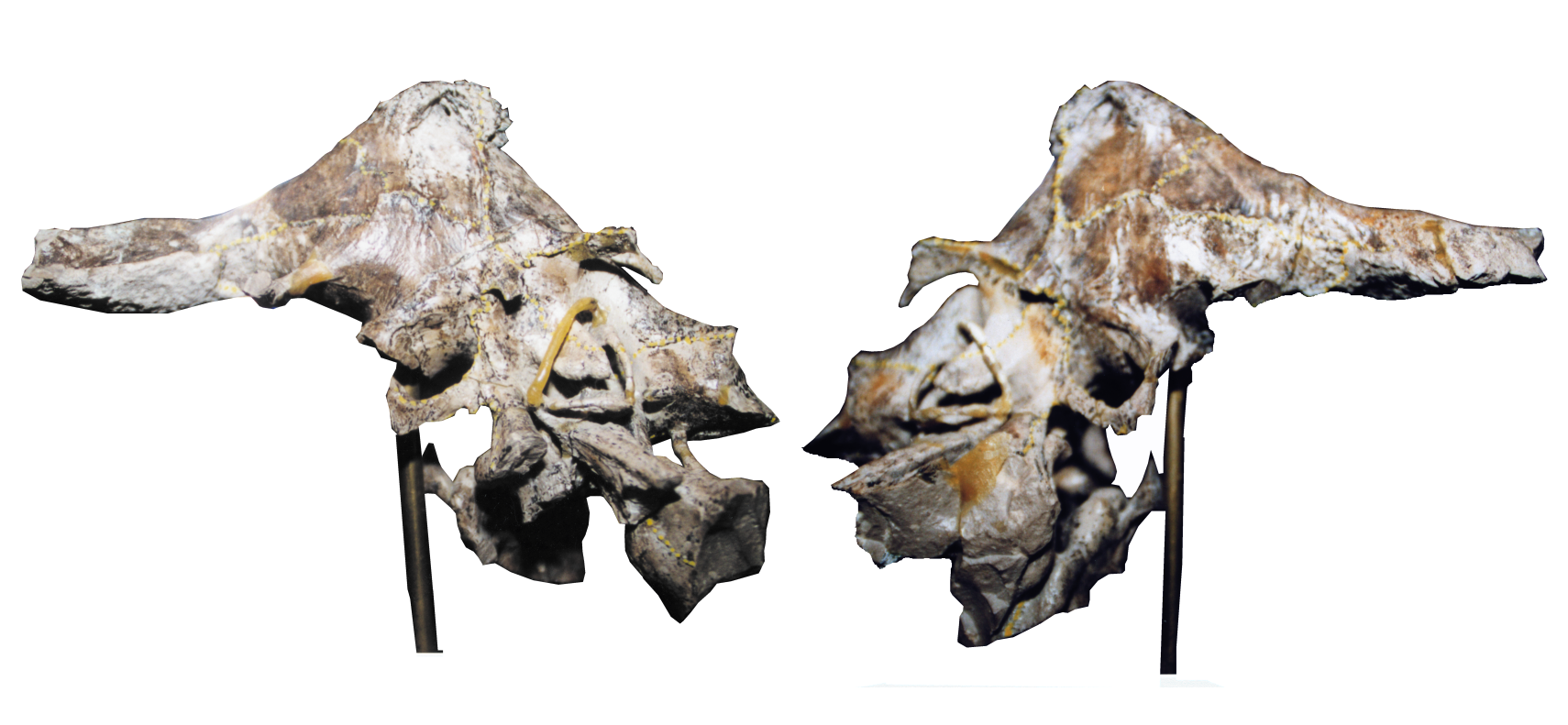
Endocast (cast of the brain cavity) of Allosaurus

The brain of Allosaurus, as interpreted from spiral CT scanning of an endocast, was more consistent with crocodilian brains than those of the other living archosaurs, birds. The structure of the vestibular apparatus indicates that the skull was held nearly horizontal, as opposed to strongly tipped up or down. The structure of the inner ear was like that of a crocodilian, indicating that Allosaurus was more adapted to hear lower frequencies and would have had difficulty hearing subtle sounds. The olfactory bulbs were large and well suited for detecting odors, but were typical for an animal of its size. The opening for the trigeminal nerve was relatively small compared to those of birds and crocodilians; this is also true of other non-avian theropods, and suggests they did not have the heightened facial sensitivity of crocodilians and some birds. As with other large theropods, the endocranial volume of Allosaurus is proportionally greater than in smaller theropods; this is thought to have accommodated larger dural venous sinuses, helping to cool the brain.

=== Paleopathology ===
Bone spur (exostosis) in the foot of the specimen "Big Al"

Pathologies (evidence of injury or disease) are common in large theropods, and those of Allosaurus are particularly well-documented. Most cases are traumatic injuries, but evidence for infections and developmental disorders has also been presented.

In 1972, Kristen Petersen and colleagues listed multiple pathologies present in specimens from the Cleveland-Lloyd Quarry. These include willow breaks in two ribs, distortion of joint surfaces, ankylosis (joint stiffness) in tail vertebrae, instances where vertebrae from the tip of the tail are fused together, the amputation of a chevron and a foot bone possibly due to bites, exostoses (bony outgrowths) in a toe bone, and lesions that are possibly caused by infections. Possible evidence for osteoarthritis has been controversial.

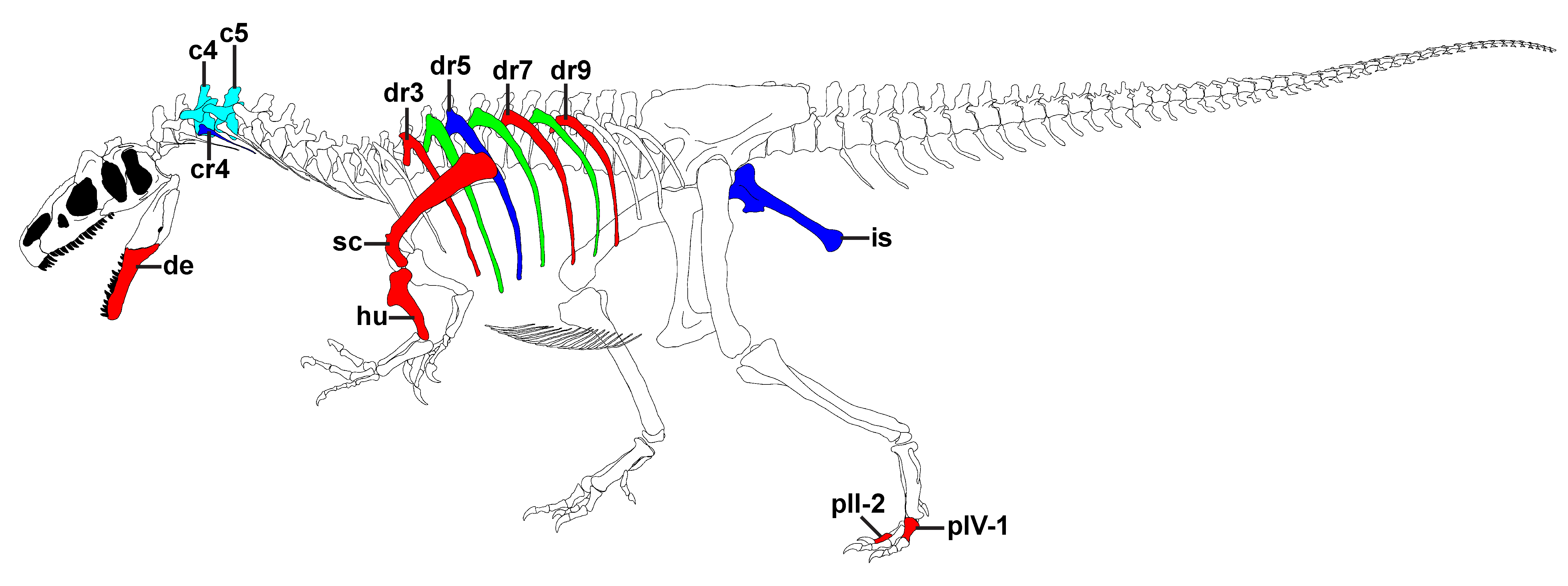
Skeletal restoration of "Big Al II" showing bones with pathologies

In a 2001 study, Bruce Rothschild and colleagues reported stress fractures in 3 out of 47 examined hand bones and in 17 out of 281 examined foot bones of Allosaurus, more than in Albertosaurus, Ornithomimus and Archaeornithomimus. If caused by damage accumulating while walking or running, the fractures would be expected to be more common in the middle digit of the foot than in other digits. No such bias was found, suggesting that most of these injuries instead occurred while holding onto struggling prey. The authors also identified two cases of tendon avulsions, where parts of the bone were torn out by an attaching tendon, in forelimbs of Allosaurus and Tyrannosaurus. The high forces required to cause such avulsions may again be attributed to struggling prey, leading the authors to suggest that these theropods were active predators rather than merely scavengers.

The specimen "Big Al" preserves 19 pathologies across the skeleton. According to Rebecca Hanna, who described these pathologies in detail in 2002, some of these conditions would have seriously impeded the individual during life and possibly contributed to its death. In the right foot, the first bone of the middle toe is greatly swollen due to a chronic infection (osteomyelitis), causing it to push against the outer toes. Another infection in the fifth metatarsal of the right foot would have caused a large swelling. Both infections were probably painful and could have resulted in a limp. The left foot shows injuries of the third metatarsal and a claw, though these were probably less severe than those of the right foot. The right hand shows a fracture along the first bone of the second finger, which also became infectious and likely caused swelling and shortening of the second finger. This infection, as well as one in the fourth rib and those in right foot, would have been suppurative (producing pus). Other pathologies in "Big Al" were probably less serious for the individual. Calluses (thickenings) with healed fractures in several ribs of the right side were likely caused by external force. Bone growths of unknown cause in several of the vertebrae would not have impeded movement. An impact on the base of the tail fractured a chevron bone which subsequently healed; this injury is estimated to have occurred between 6 and 24 months before the death of the individual.

The specimen "Big Al II" also shows multiple pathologies, including in the lower jaw, in several vertebrae and ribs, in the left shoulder blade and the left humerus, in two left toe bones, and in the right ischium of the pelvis. According to Christian Foth and colleagues in 2015, the pathologies in the shoulder blade and ribs, all on the left side of the body, could have been caused by a single impact to the body. A fracture in the ischium of the pelvis does not show signs of healing; Foth and colleagues suggested that this injury might have impeded locomotion and could have been the direct cause of death. Another specimen with multiple pathologies (HS0387) from Dana Quarry in Wyoming was described by Lida Xing and colleagues in 2022. Pathologies in the right shoulder blade and in the eighth and ninth dorsal vertebrae of this specimen were interpreted as spondyloarthropathy, the first evidence for this condition in a theropod.

== Paleoecology ==
=== Distribution ===
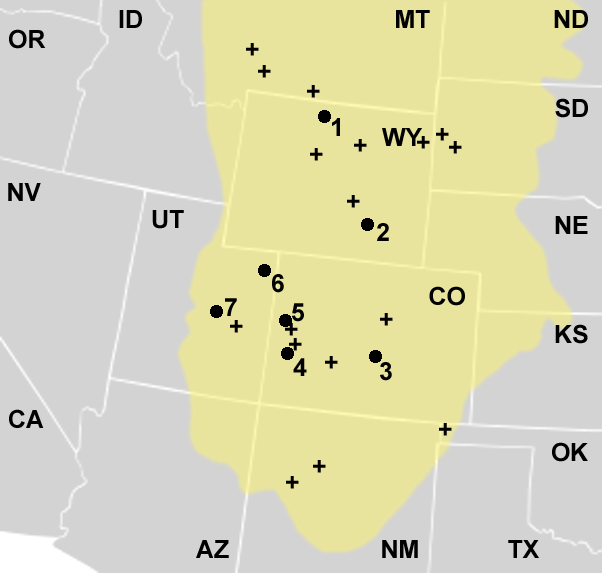
Locations in the Morrison Formation (yellow) where Allosaurus remains have been found

Allosaurus is known from the Morrison Formation of the American West and from the Alcobaça, Bombarral, and Lourinhã formations in Portugal. In a 2016 study, a tooth from Lower Saxony, Germany, was assigned to Allosaurus sp. Both the North American and European occurrences date to the Kimmeridgian to Tithonian ages of the Late Jurassic. Allosaurus has also been reported from several other countries such as Russia (A. sibiricus), Tanzania (A. tendagurensis), and Switzerland (A. meriani), though these specimens are no longer assigned to the genus.

The Morrison Formation covers an area of 1.2 million km², and Allosaurus is found across this range. It occurs in the Salt Wash and Brushy Basin members and their equivalents, being absent only in the oldest part of the formation. Most specimens are not yet assigned to any particular species. According to a 2024 study by Susannah Maidment, A. fragilis and A. jimmadseni appear to have been contemporaneous but separated geographically, with A. fragilis concentrated in the south and east of the Morrison basin and A. jimmadseni in the north and west. Both species occur together only at Dry Mesa quarry. The species A. anax is only known from the Kenton 1 Quarry in western Oklahoma from rocks of the Kenton Member, a locally recognised member equivalent to the Brushy Basin Member. Allosaurus is the most common theropod in the Morrison Formation, accounting for 70 to 75% of theropod specimens.

=== Paleoenvironment ===
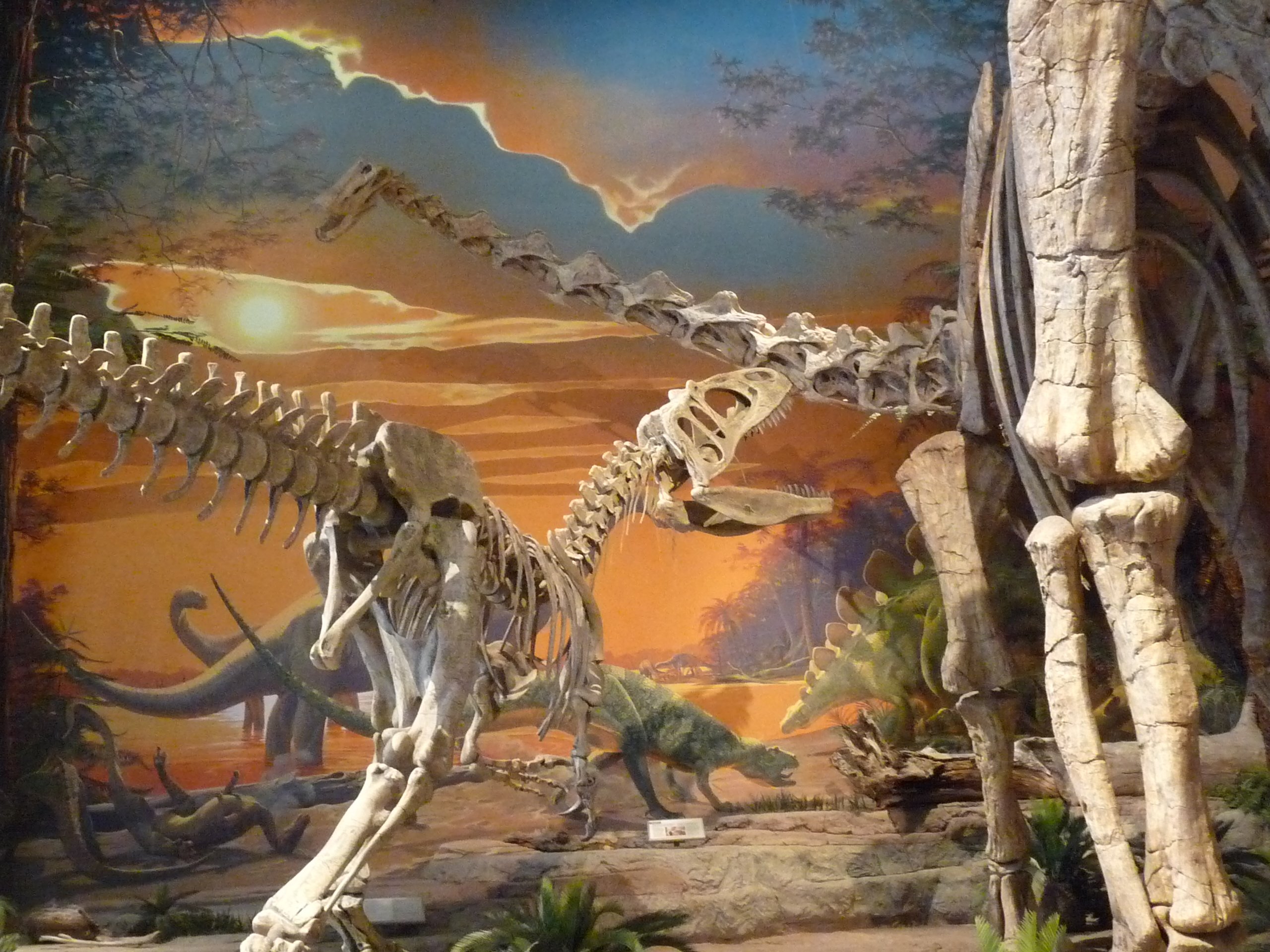
Allosaurus skeleton mounted as if attacking Diplodocus, New Mexico Museum of Natural History and Science

The Morrison Formation is interpreted as a semiarid environment with distinct wet and dry seasons, and flat floodplains. Vegetation varied from river-lining forests of conifers, tree ferns, and ferns (gallery forests), to fern savannas with occasional trees such as the Araucaria-like conifer Brachyphyllum. Animal fossils discovered include bivalves, snails, ray-finned fishes, frogs, salamanders, turtles, sphenodonts, lizards, terrestrial and aquatic crocodylomorphs, several species of pterosaur, numerous dinosaur species, and early mammals such as docodonts, multituberculates, symmetrodonts, and triconodonts. Dinosaurs known from the Morrison include the theropods Ceratosaurus, Ornitholestes, Tanycolagreus, and Torvosaurus, the sauropods Haplocanthosaurus, Camarasaurus, Cathetosaurus, Brachiosaurus, Suuwassea, Apatosaurus, Brontosaurus, Barosaurus, Diplodocus, Supersaurus, Amphicoelias, and Maraapunisaurus, and the ornithischians Camptosaurus, Dryosaurus, and Stegosaurus. Allosaurus is commonly found at the same sites as Apatosaurus, Camarasaurus, Diplodocus, and Stegosaurus. The Late Jurassic formations of Portugal where Allosaurus is present are interpreted as having been similar to the Morrison, but with a stronger marine influence. Many of the dinosaurs of the Morrison Formation are the same genera as those seen in Portuguese rocks (mainly Allosaurus, Ceratosaurus, Torvosaurus, and Stegosaurus), or have a close counterpart (Brachiosaurus and Lusotitan, Camptosaurus and Draconyx).

Paleoenvironment of the Morrison Formation, with Allosaurus at the right

Allosaurus was at the top trophic level of the Morrison food chain. Calcium isotopic values show Allosaurus was an opportunistic predator that ate Camarasaurus, Camptosaurus, and Diplodocus, although it is unclear if it was hunting or scavenging on the sauropods. It also revealed Allosaurus primarily consumed flesh with only small amounts of bone being consumed compared to tyrannosaurids like Tyrannosaurus. It coexisted with fellow large theropods Ceratosaurus and Torvosaurus in both the United States and Portugal. According to Robert Bakker, the three appear to have had different ecological niches, based on anatomy and the location of fossils. Ceratosaurus and Torvosaurus may have preferred to be active around waterways, and had lower, thinner bodies that would have given them an advantage in forest and underbrush terrains, whereas Allosaurus was more compact, with longer legs, faster but less maneuverable, and seems to have preferred dry floodplains. Ceratosaurus, better known than Torvosaurus, differed noticeably from Allosaurus in functional anatomy by having a taller, narrower skull with large, broad teeth.

=== Taphonomy ===
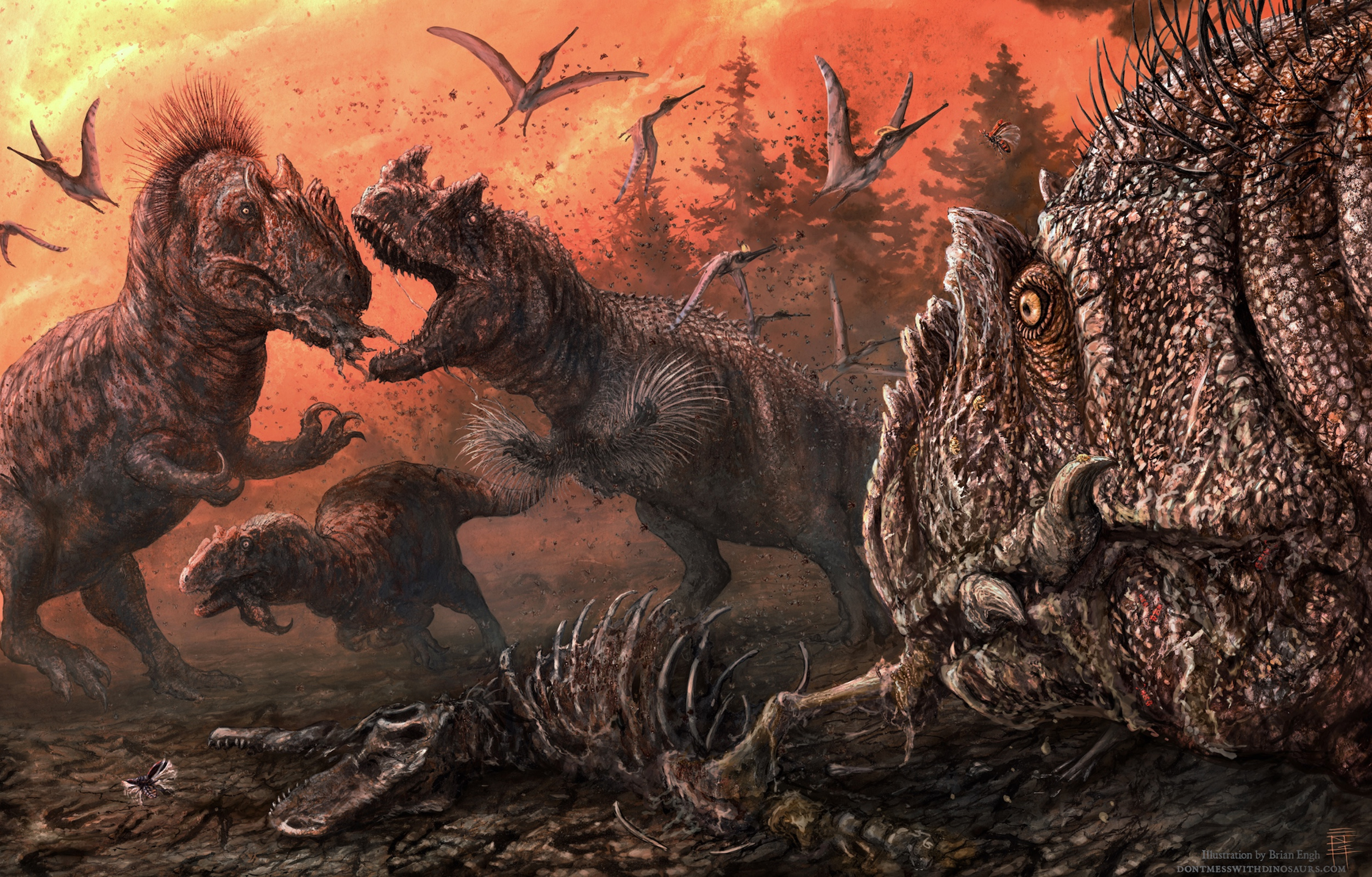
Dry season at the Mygatt-Moore Quarry showing Ceratosaurus (center) and Allosaurus fighting over the desiccated carcass of another theropod

Utah's Cleveland-Lloyd quarry is unusual in that about 66% of the vertebrate fossils belong to a single species of carnivore, A. fragilis, and that the bones are disarticulated (no longer connected to each other) and well-mixed. More papers have been published on how this site may have formed than on any other fossil tetrapod site. A popular idea is that the site was a predator trap to which the Allosaurus were attracted and became mired. In this case, the carcasses could have accumulated over a longer period of time. Other studies postulated a single catastrophe as the cause, such as a severe drought during which an Allosaurus population congregated around a water hole and, by their presence, deterred other dinosaurs. The disarticulation of the bones has been explained with trampling by other dinosaurs; movements of the sediment; scavenging; up-welling water; or repeated reworking and re-deposition of the bones. It is also possible that the Allosaurus population died elsewhere for unknown reasons and that their bones were washed into the site.

A bone assemblage in the Upper Jurassic Mygatt-Moore Quarry preserves an unusually high occurrence of theropod bite marks, most of which can be attributed to Allosaurus and Ceratosaurus, while others could have been made by Torvosaurus given the size of the striations. While the position of the bite marks on the herbivorous dinosaurs is consistent with predation or early access to remains, bite marks found on Allosaurus material suggest scavenging, either from the other theropods or from another Allosaurus. The unusually high concentration of theropod bite marks compared to other assemblages could be explained either by a more complete utilization of resources during a dry season by theropods, or by a collecting bias in other localities.
