= Natural History Museum of Utah =

Museum in Salt Lake City, Utah, U.S.

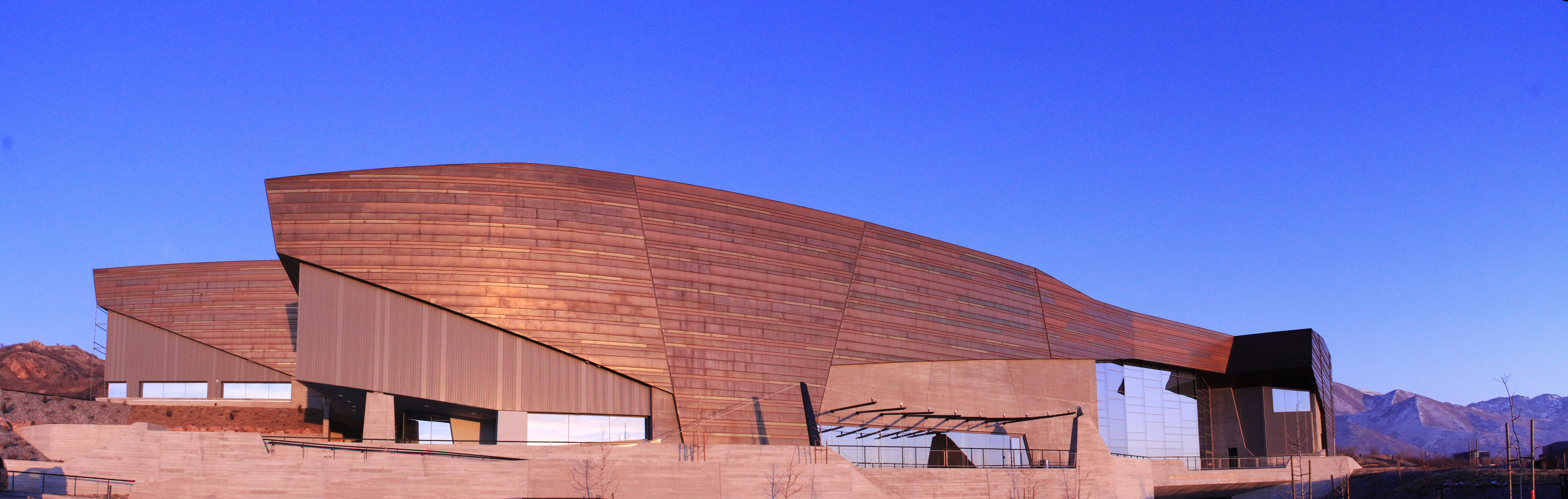
- The Rio Tinto Center, home of the museum since 2011
- Established: 1969; 57 years ago
- Location: 301 Wakara Way, Salt Lake City, Utah
- Coordinates: 40.764°N 111.823°W
- Type: Natural history
- Visitors: About 250,000 annually
- Director: Jason Cryan
- Website: nhmu.utah.edu

The Natural History Museum of Utah is a museum located in Salt Lake City, Utah, United States. The museum shows exhibits of natural history subjects, with an emphasis on Utah and the Intermountain West. The mission of the museum is to illuminate the natural world and the place of humans within it. A new building, named the Rio Tinto Center, opened in November 2011. The museum is part of the University of Utah and is located in the university's Research Park.

== History ==
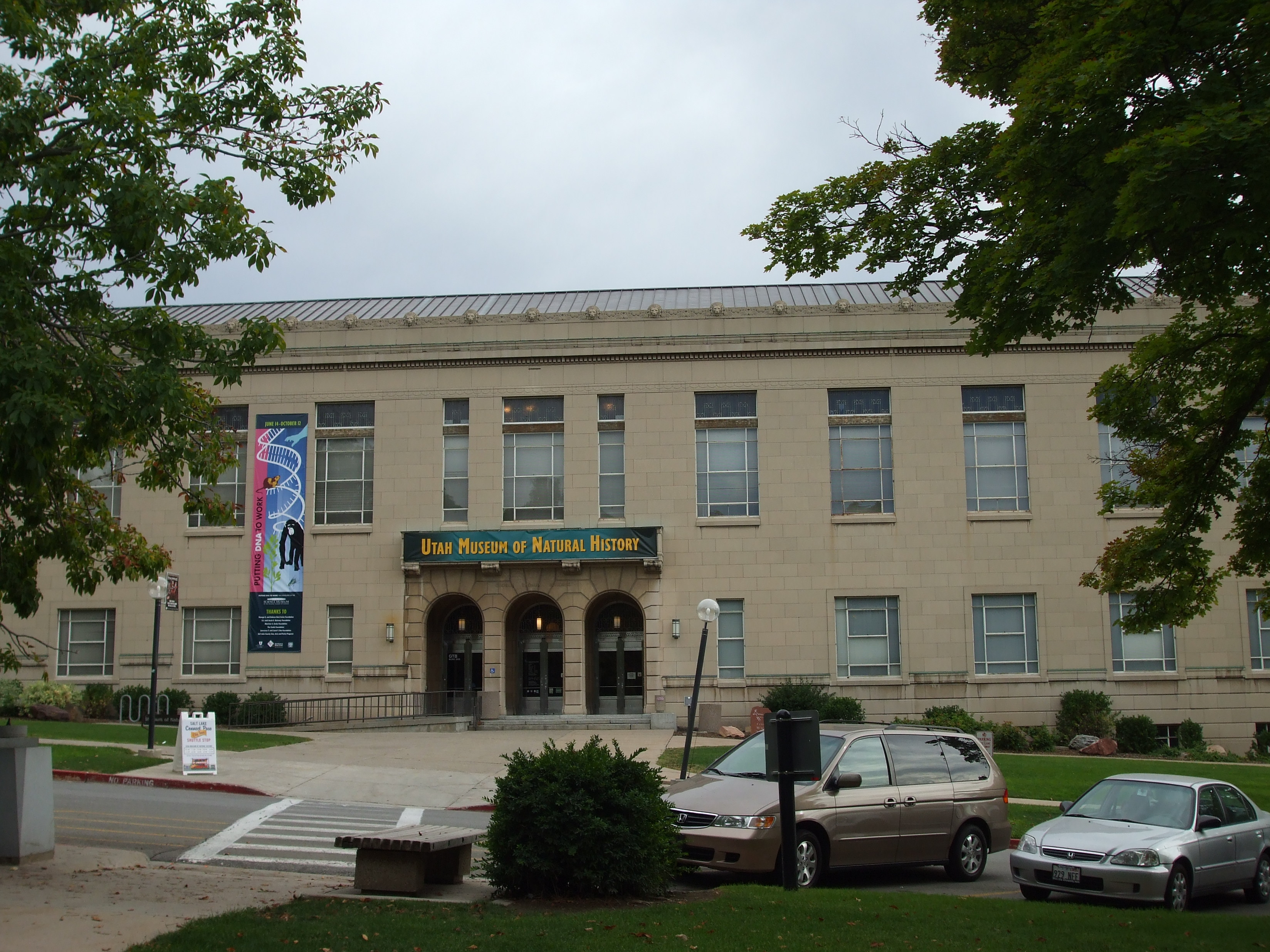
The George Thomas Building, shown here in 2008 when it was still home of the museum on the University of Utah's President's Circle

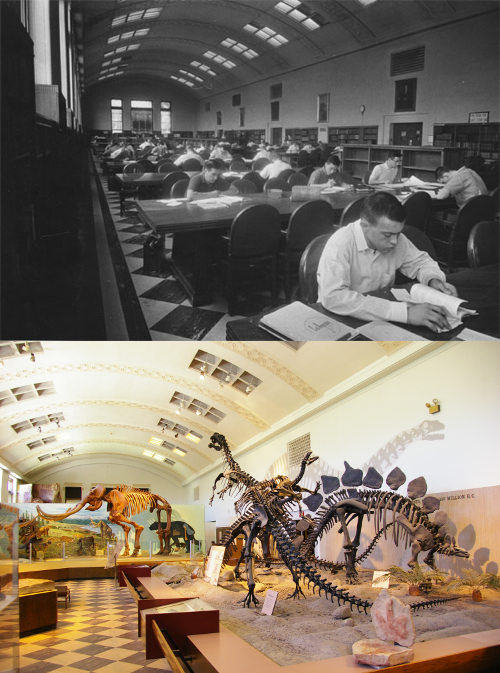
Inside the George Thomas Building, upper photograph: c. 1950, a reading room in the building's library. Lower photograph: the same reading room in 2009, transformed since 1969 into the Utah Museum of Natural History (and dismantled as of 2011). Now the George Thomas Building houses the Gary and Ann Crocker Science Center, a research center. Note the wrong posture of all skeletal mounts, since 2011 re-mounted in anatomically correct postures at the Rio Tinto building.

The museum was conceived in 1959, when the University of Utah faculty committee decided to consolidate natural history collections from around its campus. It was established as the Utah Museum of Natural History on the University of Utah campus in 1963 by the Utah State Legislature.

In 1969, the museum opened in the former George Thomas Library and included specimens from the Deseret Museum, as well as from the Charles Nettleton Strevell Museum that was located in the old Lafayette School on South Temple Street from 1939 until 1947.

The paleontology collections acquired a very important amount of new collected specimens during the 1960s, particularly fossilized remains of dinosaurs. It all began when a young local paleontologist called James Henry Madsen Jr. obtained his Master of Science in 1959 in the University of Utah. The following year, as of 1960, Madsen was hired as an assistant for Professor William Lee Stokes of the Princeton University, who at that time performed the dauntless project to extensively dig the Cleveland-Lloyd Dinosaur Quarry. Since the 1920s, it had been firmly established by geologists that this quarry is one of the most important paleontological sites ever found in the United States, and still in the early 1960s tens of thousands of disarticulated dinosaur bones were buried in the rock, awaiting to be excavated. Because the bone bed was so vast and contained a so huge quantity of fossilized bones (mainly from Allosaurus fragilis), it seemed obvious to Stokes and Madsen that it was literally impossible for a single unique institution to dig up a number of specimens being realistically representative of the overall total. To accomplish this task, or at least a reasonable part of it, Stokes and Madsen founded the University of Utah Cooperative Dinosaur Project, thanks to initial funds allowed by the University of Utah and its Department of Geology. The project worked for 16 years in close collaboration not only with museums and institutions within the US, but also with prestigious international museums and research centers. Since financial assistance was brought by all the institutions who had participated in the project, the Dinosaur Project granted them casts or even original composite specimens of the dinosaurs found in the quarry.

In the running time of the Cooperative Dinosaur Project (from 1960 to 1976), tons of fossilized bones were dug up from the quarry, numerous remains of species as famous as Camarasaurus, Camptosaurus, Ceratosaurus, Stegosaurus, and Allosaurus, among others (Allosaurus is by far the most represented species, with 44-46 individuals found). In addition to these already known species, two new species were discovered and named: Stokesosaurus (in 1974); and Marshosaurus (in 1976); both of whose holotypes are preserved in the Natural History Museum of Utah.

In 1976, the University of Utah stopped the Cooperative Dinosaur Project. To continue financing his research, Madsen founded Dinolab, a company that cast and sold skeletons of dinosaurs to museums, institutions, or private buyers. Madsen died in 2009 and Dinolab disappeared in 2014, but thanks to the University of Utah Cooperative Dinosaur Project and Madsen's excavations in the Cleveland-Lloyd Dinosaur Quarry back in the 1960s and 1970s, the Natural History Museum of Utah now is able to display the largest collection in the world of Allosaurus skeletons, among some additional dinosaur skeletal mounts belonging to other species.

In 1963, Dr. Jesse D. Jennings, a professor and archaeologist, was appointed director of the museum. The Utah Museum of Natural History opened to the public in 1969. Jennings was the director for 10 years.

In 1973, Don Hague, the museum's curator and first paid employee became the director. He led the museum for nearly 20 years, retiring in 1992.

Dr. Sarah George was the director of the museum for 27 years, from 1992 to 2019. Dr. Jason Cryan has served as the fourth executive director of the museum since March 2020.

In 2011, the museum moved from the old George Thomas Library location at 1390 Presidents Circle into the Rio Tinto Center, in the University of Utah's Research Park 301 Wakara Way, Salt Lake City. The move also resulted in a change of name to the Natural History Museum of Utah.

The Rio Tinto Center is a 163,000-square-foot (15,100-square-metre; 1.51-hectare) building set on a 17-acre (6.9-hectare) campus in the foothills of the Wasatch Mountains. The building's highest point is a round structure on the back or east side which houses the Native Voices gallery. The architects for the building were Ennead Architects from New York City and GSBS of Salt Lake City. Ralph Appelbaum Associates designed the exhibits.

== Collections and research ==
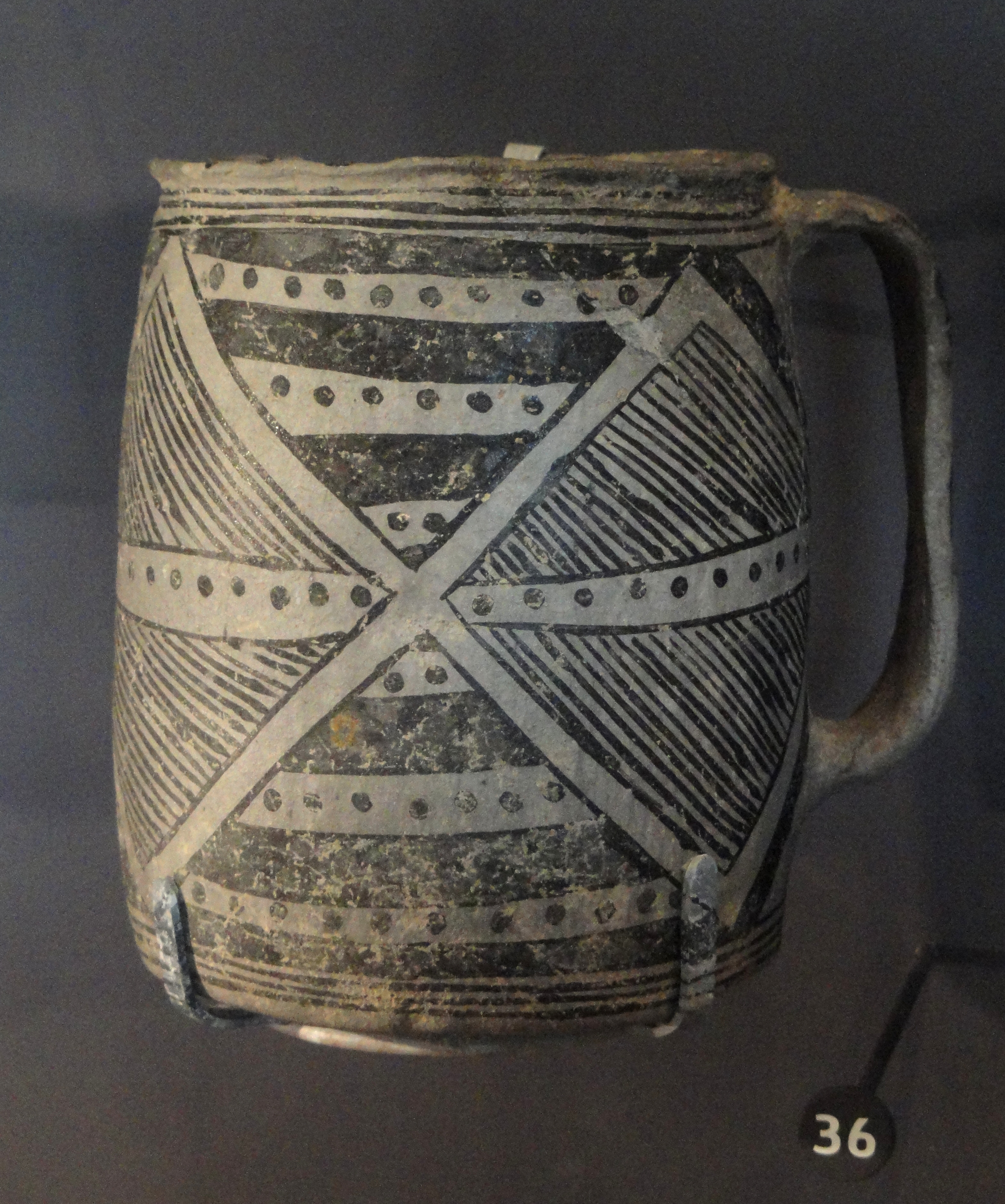
Mesa Verde black-on-white mug, San Juan Anasazi, 1200-1300 CE

The Natural History Museum of Utah has more than 1.65 million objects in its collection that are used for research and education. The museum's collections emphasize the natural history of Utah and are accessible to researchers from around the world. The majority of the collections are from public lands within the inter-mountain region of the United States.

Collections are used in studies on geological, biological, and cultural diversity, as well as the history of living systems and human cultures within the Utah region. The goal of the museum is to increase the collections while providing the widest possible access to that information.

The collection features one million objects related to anthropology.

- Archaeological collections of approximately 750,000 objects
- Associated records from more than 3,800 sites
- Ethnographic collections including more than 2,000 objects

The paleontology collection includes 12,000 vertebrates, 4,000 invertebrates, and 7,000 plants. The entomology collection includes 140,000 specimens. The collection related to vertebrate zoology includes 30,000 mammals, 20,000 birds, and 18,000 reptiles. The mineralogy collection includes 3,700 minerals. The botany collection includes 123,000 specimens. The malacology collection includes 25,000 specimens.

== Permanent exhibitions ==
The museum has ten permanent exhibitions:

Past Worlds | A sequence of snapshots in time spanning hundreds of millions of years depicts a range of Utah’s ancient environments and their changing life forms.

Great Salt Lake | The compelling narrative of the Great Salt Lake, a remnant of ancient Lake Bonneville is brought to life through hands-on interactives, sounds, smells, and a spectacular view of the Lake itself.

Land | A journey through three distinct physiographic regions formed over millions of years, the Land showcases Utah’s Middle Rocky Mountains, Basin and Range, and Colorado Plateau.

Life | The web of life is illustrated in a series of exhibits exploring complexity from DNA to ecosystems, with a focus on Utah’s extraordinary biological diversity.

First Peoples | The story of Great Basin’s prehistoric peoples is told while putting visitors in the shoes of archaeologists who use science to interpret the past.

Gems and Minerals | Rough mineral forms are juxtaposed with elegant cut gemstones, all in brilliant colors. Peer in to see minerals that fluoresce and take in 12 vertical feet of minerals suspended before you.

Native Voices | The traditions of Utah’s native peoples are featured in this circular gallery nestled in the hillside at the top of the building.

Our Backyard | In Our Backyard, young guests will discover the excitement of scientific exploration in a special exhibition designed for the smallest museum visitors.

Utah Futures | In this thought-provoking space “Utah Climate Challenge,” a fast-paced multiplayer game, invites you to work with others to envision a healthy and sustainable future for Utah.

A Climate of Hope | Utah’s climate is changing and the impacts are profound. The good news is that it’s not too late to create a future in which humans and nature thrive.

== Rotating exhibitions ==
The museum houses a special exhibition gallery with rotating special exhibitions.

NHMU's current special exhibition is Mysteries of the Ice Ages, which explores 80,000 years of Earth’s dramatic history, uncovering the mysteries of ice and the remarkable adaptations that allowed life to survive in an unforgiving world. This special exhibition is on display through January 4, 2026.

== Educational programs ==
The educational programs are organized by the Education & Community Engagement Department. Development of school programs is closely tied to the public school system's core curriculum. The museum's educational programs include:

- Self-Guided and Partner Field Trips: Students explore the museum in chaperoned groups.
- Junior Science Academy: Classes for fourth- and fifth-grade students tied to the core curriculum and held in the museum.
- Child and family programs: After-school, Saturday, and summer classes primarily for children in grades K-6, covering natural history and science.
- Adult programs: Workshops, lectures, and special events intended for an adult audience.

== Outreach ==
Outreach efforts include:

- Museum on the Move: Museum educators give core-aligned classes on five topics in fourth-grade classrooms statewide.
- Teaching Toolboxes: Teachers are able to check boxes out for 2 weeks at a time.
- Youth Teaching Youth: A program with Glendale Middle School; youth from at-risk environments are trained to instruct elementary school classes using outreach kits. These middle school youth conduct all classroom outreach in the Salt Lake School District. As these students graduate to high school, they are offered internships in disciplines at the museum and throughout the university.
- Traveling Treasures: Traveling Treasures visits up to 12 cities and hosts family science festivals throughout the state. This community programming allows the Natural History Museum of Utah to connect with Utah’s communities statewide—from Vernal to Delta, and Logan to Kanab.
- Teen Explainers: Teen Explainers is a paid high school internship program focusing on communication and learning about museums. Teen Explainers engage museum guests and the public in interactive learning experiences.

== Role at the University of Utah ==
The museum is part of the academic life of the University of Utah. The collections offer research opportunities and provide a learning laboratory for students. Museum programs expose students to many aspects of museum studies: educational outreach, exhibit design and fabrication development, public relations, and curriculum development.

The museum is a repository for collections that were accumulated by the university's departments of Anthropology, Biology, and Geology. The collections are held in trust for faculty, graduate students, and undergraduates who have access to the collections for research and teaching purposes.

In-service training is offered by the Utah Museum of Natural History Education Department; university credit can be earned with these courses, leading to salary lane changes for public school teachers. These courses are coordinated with the Academic Outreach and Continuing Education and the Department of Teaching and Learning. As the founder of the university's Genetic Science Learning Center, the museum continues to partner in its teacher training program.

The museum meeting rooms are available for rental for on- and off-campus groups.

== Bibliography ==
- Foy, Paul (December 3, 2011), "Please touch,' says new Utah natural history museum", The Seattle Times
- Fryer, Brian (December 9, 2011), "New Natural History Museum of Utah Opens to Big Fanfare", ENR Mountain States, McGraw-Hill
- Gonchar, Joann (January 2012), "Natural History Museum of Utah", Architectural Record
- Gorrell, Mike (July 19, 2012), "New Natural History Museum is drawing big crowds", The Salt Lake Tribune
- Libby, Brian (March–April 2012), "Embracing History", Architect, American Institute of Architects
- Maffly, Brian (November 15, 2011), "History comes alive at new Natural History Museum of Utah", The Salt Lake Tribune
- Rothstein, Edward (March 23, 2012). "History Carved Out of the Hills". The New York Times. AP.
- Lange, Alexandra, "Hiking the Museum", Observatory.DesignObserver.com, Design Observer
- "Natural History Museum of Utah at Rio Tinto Center, University of Utah", Consulting-Specifying Engineer, August 9, 2012
