= Taunshits =

Stratovolcano in the eastern portion of the Kamchatka peninsula

Highest point
- Elevation: 2,353 m (7,720 ft)
- Prominence: 1,550 m (5,090 ft)
- Listing: Ultra, Ribu
- Coordinates: 54°31′42″N 159°48′15″E

Geography
- Location within Russia
- Location: Kamchatka, Russia
- Parent range: Eastern Range

Geology
- Mountain type: Stratovolcano
- Last eruption: 550 BCE

Taunshits (Russian: Тауншиц) is a stratovolcano located in the eastern part of the Kamchatka Peninsula, Russia.

It is part of the Kamchatka-Kurile volcanic arc, and volcanism in this arc is caused by the subduction of the Pacific Plate beneath the Okhotsk Plate. More specifically, volcanic activity at Taunshits relates to a local system of eastward-trending faults, and some additional volcanoes are controlled by the same fault system, such as Uzon and Kikhpinych which lie both east of Taunshits.

Taunshits is a somma volcano and features lava flows, and its summit is formed by a ridge. The stratovolcano contains a collapse crater formed during the Holocene, as well as a lava dome; a viscous lava flow was erupted in the crater and extends down the western flank. Erosion has formed gullies in the slopes of the volcano. Two satellite vents and several cinder cones are found south of the edifice.

Taunshits has principally erupted andesite and basaltic andesite, and its eruption products are calc-alkaline with moderate potassium content. Volcanic activity at Taunshits involves the formation of lava domes and pyroclastic flows, similar to Bezymyanny or Shiveluch, but widespread andesitic lava effusion has also occurred at the lower levels of the edifice.

Activity at Taunshits commenced late during the Pleistocene, less than 39,000 years before present considering that the ignimbrites generated by the Uzon eruption are found beneath lava flows from the volcano. The Pleistocene activity constructed the foot of the volcano, which has tuya characteristics.

Activity decreased during the Holocene. 7,700 years before present, a major eruption ejected about 3 cubic kilometres (0.72 cu mi) of material; it may have been preceded by the sector collapse. 7,000 years before present, a sector collapse occurred, leaving a hummocky landscape around the volcano; no eruption occurred according to some sources, while others believe that one took place. The landslide extends over a length of 17 kilometres (11 mi) and has a volume of less than 1 cubic kilometre (0.24 cu mi); other sources assume a volume of 3 cubic kilometres (0.72 cu mi) and a length of 19 kilometres (12 mi). The landslide occurred on the western slope of the volcano; Taunshits developed on the western slope of Uzon volcano and the resulting westward tilt of its basement may have predisposed the edifice towards collapsing westward. The landslide is responsible for the formation of the collapse crater on the summit.

Lava flows were extruded about 2,500 years before present, and 2,400 years before present the lava dome in the crater was emplaced; this event was accompanied by pyroclastic flows. The last eruption occurred around 550 BCE; As of 2012, no seismic station is located at Taunshits, which hampers the monitoring of activity at this volcano. Solfataric activity occurs close to the edifice.

== See also ==
- List of volcanoes in Russia

== Sources ==
- "Sopka Taunshits, Russia". Peakbagger.com.
