= Jurassic National Monument =

National monument in Emry County, Utah, United States

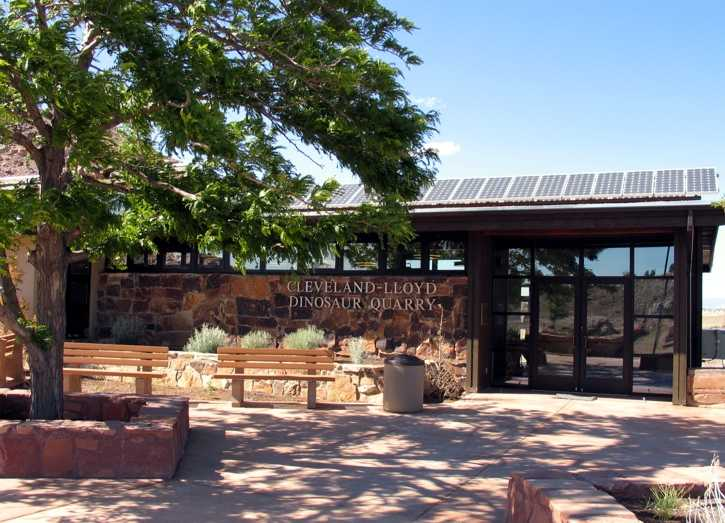
- Cleveland-Lloyd Dinosaur Quarry Visitor Center

- Location within Utah
- Location: Emery County, Utah
- Nearest city: Cleveland
- Coordinates: 39.32282°N 110.68951°W
- Governing body: Bureau of Land Management
- Website: www.blm.gov/programs/national-conservation-lands/utah/jurassic-national-monument

U.S. National Natural Landmark
- Designated: 1965

Jurassic National Monument, at the site of the Cleveland-Lloyd Dinosaur Quarry, well known for containing the densest concentration of Jurassic dinosaur fossils ever found, is a paleontological site located near Cleveland, Utah, in the San Rafael Swell, a part of the geological layers known as the Morrison Formation.

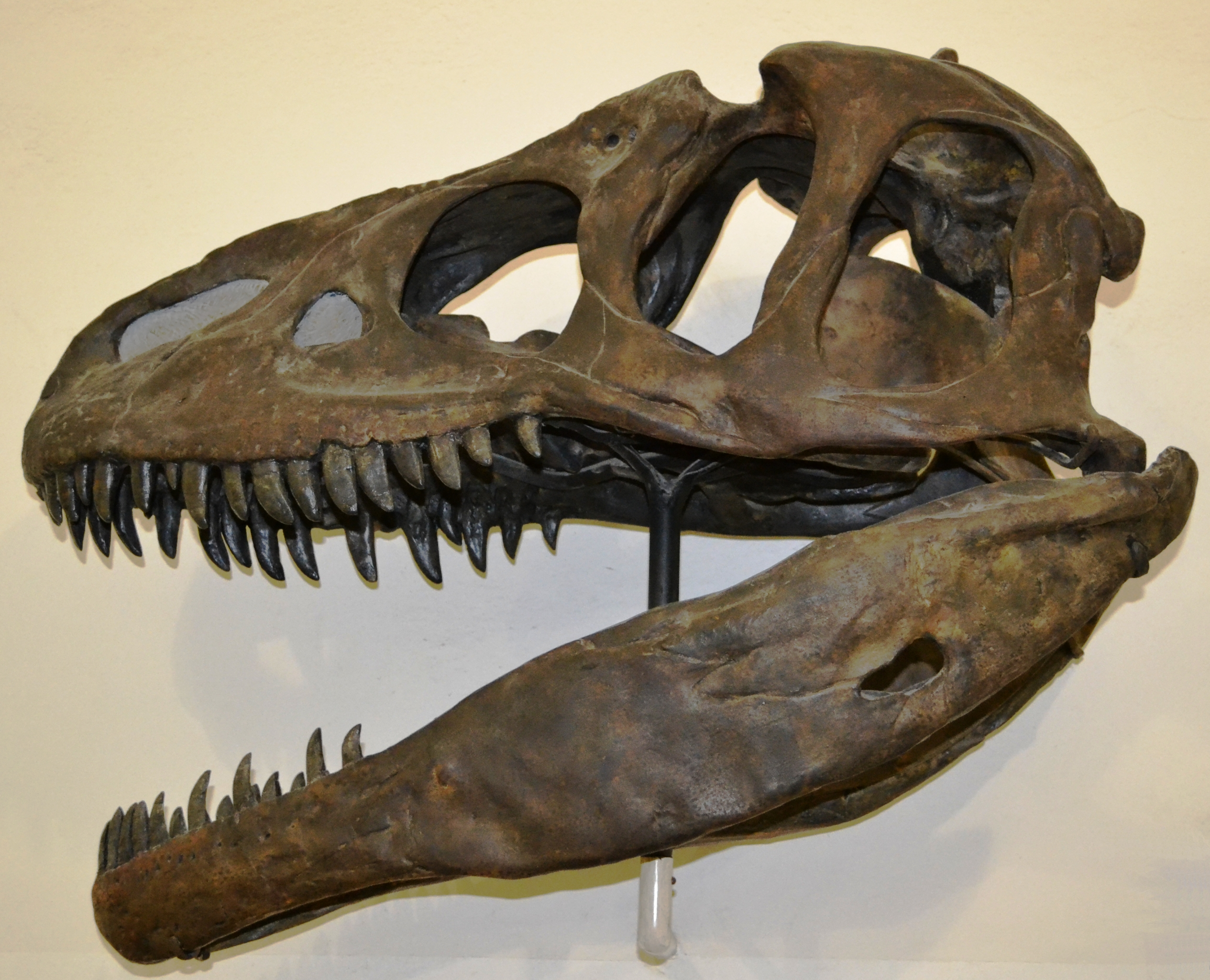
Skull cast of Allosaurus fragilis, assembled from moulded bones found at Cleveland-Lloyd Dinosaur Quarry. The skull is now at the Palaeontological Museum, Munich (Germany).

Over 16,200 bones have been excavated from this Jurassic excavation site and there are many thousands more awaiting excavation and study. It was designated a National Natural Landmark in October 1965. The John D. Dingell Jr. Conservation, Management, and Recreation Act, signed into law by President Donald Trump on March 12, 2019, named it as a national monument.

All of these bones, belonging to different species, are found disarticulated and indistinctly mixed together. It was hypothesized by Peter Dodson in 1980 that this strong concentration of mixed fossilized bones was due to a "predator trap", however it is more likely that this site was actually caused by an extreme drought. No strict scientific consensus currently exists.

== Visiting ==
The visitor center is administered by the Bureau of Land Management. There is a skeleton reconstruction of an adult Allosaurus (and other bones) on display in the visitor center, along with many other exhibits. A renovated and expanded quarry visitor center was dedicated on April 28, 2007. The visitor center is open seasonally with variable hours.

== History ==
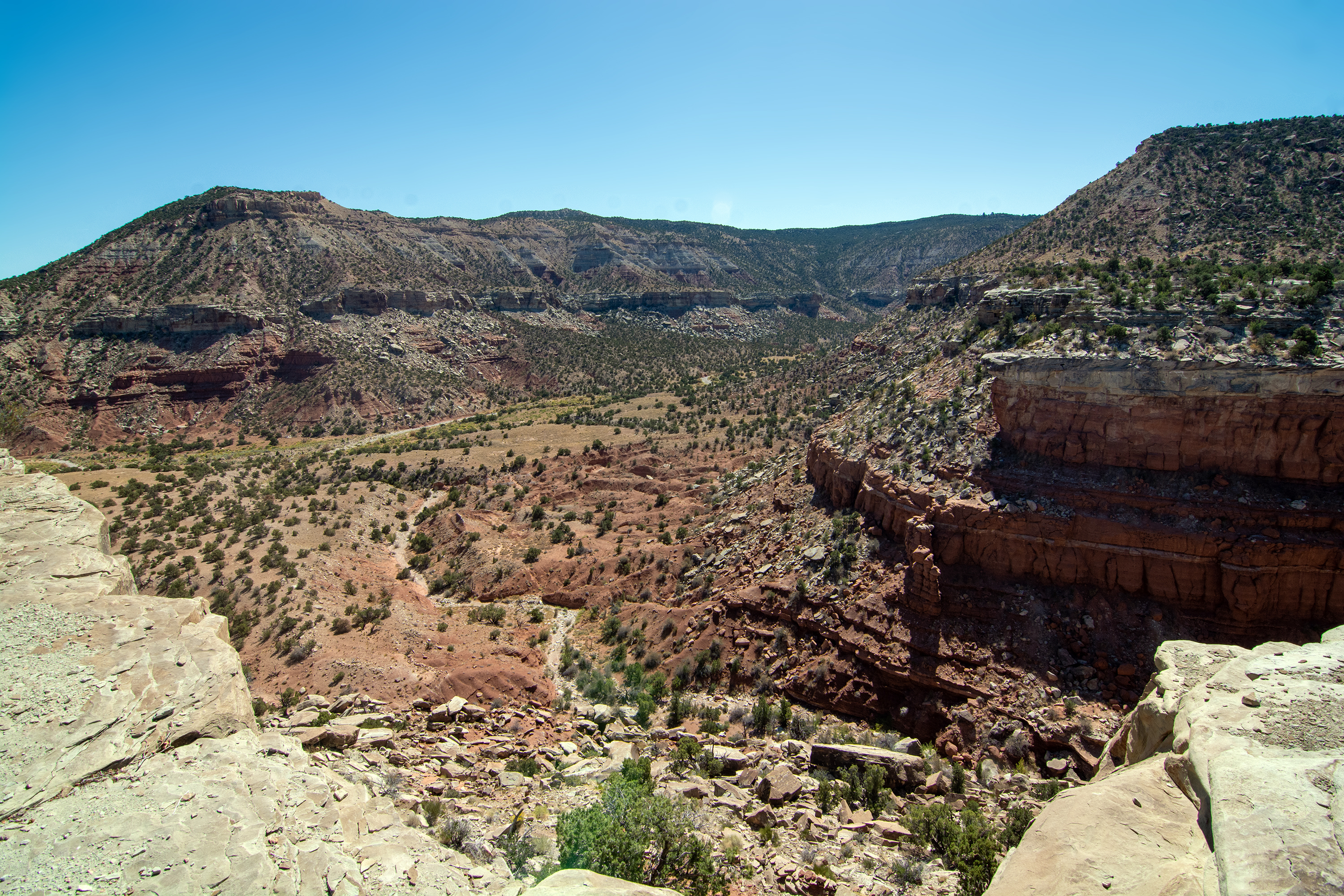
Jurassic National Monument landscape, 2019

The quarry was found by sheepherders and cattlemen as they drove their animals through the area during the late 19th century. In 1927, Golden York of the Department of Geology at the University of Utah and Ferdinand Friis Hintze, director of the Department at the time, were the first who started to methodically excavate the site. Over several weeks, approximately 800 bones were collected by this first expedition. In 1929 the Department of Geology returned to the area sending Golden York on site again, though this time for a three-year campaign of excavations under the direction of Dr. Frederic J. Pack. In 1931, over these three years, 949 specimens were collected. In 1939-41 Princeton University sent a field party to the quarry to extensively dig up specimens. These Princeton expeditions were financed by Malcolm Lloyd, a lawyer of Philadelphia, who also was a Princeton alumnus with a strong interest in paleontology. Lloyd, Professor Glenn Lowell Jepsen of Princeton (1903–1974) and Brigham Young University graduated William Lee Stokes (1915–1994, later known as the "Father of Utah geology") led the expeditions. Eventually, in 1941, they recruited two students for assistance during the excavations: William W. Warner (1920–2008, graduated at Princeton two years later in 1943) and John Boyd. Because of the proximity to Cleveland, Utah, and because these expeditions were financed by Malcolm Lloyd, the site was later known as the Cleveland-Lloyd Quarry. Before the end of 1941 they have collected 1,200 bones. A part of these bones was sent to Princeton and eventually the bones were sorted to mount a complete composite skeleton of Allosaurus, but World War II broke out and the skeleton was not mounted nor exhibited in the university until February 1961. This Allosaurus skeleton, the first Allosaurus skeletal mount obtained from the quarry, has been on public display for over 63 years between 1961 and 2024 at Guyot Hall's museum of natural history of Princeton University at the campus of New Jersey, though labelled Antrodemus, which in the meantime had been synonymised with Allosaurus. It was re-mounted in 2026 in the Briger Hall building, close to Guyot Hall.

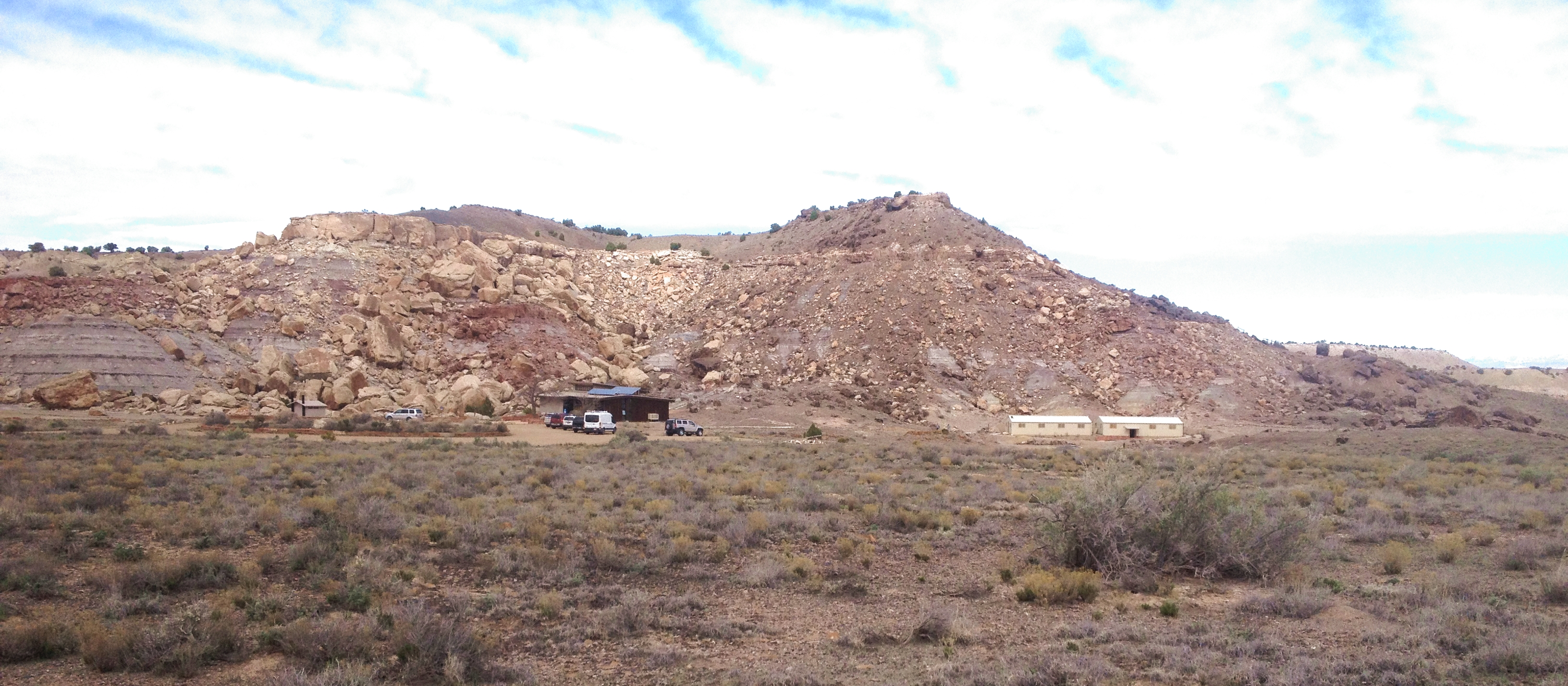
Exhibit buildings and visitor center at Jurassic National Monument. View is towards the west.

After 1941, and because excavations had been interrupted by the war, work only started again in 1960, when young paleontologist James Henry Madsen Jr. (1932–2009) was hired within the University of Utah to assist William Lee Stokes with the excavations. As of 1960 Stokes and Madsen founded the "University of Utah Cooperative Dinosaur Project", with funds of the University of Utah. This project granted casts or specimens of dinosaurs to museums and institutions from the US but also from countries all around the world, in exchange of financial and excavation assistance. The project continued until 1976 when the University of Utah interrupted the funding. Madsen managed to continue excavating the quarry by means of a private company he founded the same year, Dinolab, intended to sell casts of dinosaur skeletons to museums, institutions and private buyers. Before that, in 1974, a new dinosaur had been described by Madsen, then assistant research professor of geology and geophysics in the University of Utah. He named it Stokesosaurus clevelandi, honoring his mentor, professor William Lee Stokes. In 1976, another new dinosaur was described from fossils found in the quarry by Madsen. He named it Marshosaurus bicentesimus, honoring American paleontologist Othniel Charles Marsh (1831–1899). In 1987, Brigham Young University paleontologists excavated a fossil dinosaur egg, at the time the oldest such egg ever found.

Over the years, excavations led by different institutions, like the Princeton University, the University of Utah and the Natural History Museum of Utah, have resulted in the collection of more than 16,200 fossil bones from the quarry. While most of the original fossils are currently housed at the Natural History Museum of Utah, many skeletons reproduced from Cleveland-Lloyd dinosaur remains are now on exhibit in more than 65 museums worldwide. Original specimens from the quarry remain on public exhibit in Utah at the Natural History Museum of Utah in Salt Lake City, the BYU Museum of Paleontology in Provo, and the USU Eastern Prehistoric Museum in Price.

The U.S. Department of the Interior, Bureau of Land Management (BLM) opened a visitor center at the Cleveland-Lloyd Dinosaur Quarry in 1968. This was the first-ever BLM visitor center. On April 28, 2007, a new, larger facility was dedicated that has updated exhibits. The new visitor center generates its own electricity from rooftop solar panels.

Early in 2019, the quarry reached the official status of "national monument" under the name of "Jurassic National Monument".

== Geology ==
Map showing the thousands of dinosaur bones excavated at the Cleveland-Lloyd Dinosaur Quarry at the Jurassic National Monument.

The Cleveland-Lloyd Dinosaur Quarry of east central Utah has produced one of the most prolific dinosaurs bone assemblages in the Upper Jurassic beds of North America. The quarry is part of the Brushy Basin Member of the Morrison Formation. The fossil deposit consists of a calcareous smectitic mudstone which accumulated on the floodplain of an anastomosing river system. An anastomosing river system consists of multiple interconnected channels confined by prominent levees separated by interchannel topographic lows. The depositional environment of the quarry mudstone was an interchannel seasonal accumulation of clay nested in a topographic low between channel levees called a floodpond.

Dinosaurs came to the floodpond during a drought in search of water, with the herbivores and smaller carnivores falling prey to the large theropods present for food. As the drought continued, the dinosaurs present dwindled until eventually adult Allosaurus would resort to cannibalizing juvenile individuals for survival. The preserved fauna consists of almost all dinosaurs with the majority being carnivorous dinosaurs including Allosaurus (material from at least 44 individuals make up almost 67% of all remains), Torvosaurus (1), Ceratosaurus (1), Stokesosaurus (2), Marshosaurus (2), and a Tanycolagreus (1). Herbivorous dinosaurs include Camarasaurus (3), Diplodocus (1), Barosaurus (1), Apatosaurus (1), Camptosaurus (5), and Stegosaurus (4). Non-dinosaurian fauna include a crocodile (Goniopholis), 2 turtles (Glyptops), 4 genera of gastropoda (snails), and 4 genera of charophyte.

For a long time, the atypical predator/prey ratio (3:1) represented at the quarry was thought to be the result of possible pack hunting tendencies of Allosaurus. The high percentage of smaller individual allosaurs suggests that juveniles coordinated their efforts to capture and kill prey. They may have followed their prey into the floodpond and subsequently became mired themselves. The close spatial proximity of skull elements (most belonging to Allosaurus) seemingly supported this hypothesis. Larger individual theropods almost certainly became mired while attempting to scavenge the carcasses of other entrapped dinosaurs (Richmond and Morris, 1996). However, more recent studies suggest that the mass deaths were in fact a result of a drought, and not a predator trap. One comparison with the La Brea Tar Pits suggests that multiple, non-migratory groups of Allosaurus may have come to the area looking to find water, dying due to the harsh conditions and perhaps from diseases caused by drinking contaminated water due to rotting carcasses and feces being present. The evidence for this theory is strengthened by the fact that a large proportion of the Allosaurus specimens are juveniles, but until more evidence is recovered, this cannot yet be vindicated.

== Paleobiota ==
Fossil taxa discovered at the Cleveland-Lloyd site include:

=== Plantae ===
- Thallophyta
  - Aclistochara
  - Latochara
  - Stellatochara

=== Mollusca ===
==== Gastropoda ====
- Amplovalvata
- Amplovoluta
- Valvata
- Viviparus

=== Chelonii ===
- Glyptops

=== Dinosauria ===
Color key: Taxon / Reclassified taxon / Taxon falsely reported as present / Dubious taxon or junior synonym / Ichnotaxon / Ootaxon / Morphotaxon

Notes
Uncertain or tentative taxa are in small text
~~crossed out~~ taxa are discredited.

==== Ornithischians ====
Ornithischians reported from the Cleveland-Lloyd Quarry
Genus	Species	Notes	Images
Camptosaurus	C. dispar		
Stegosaurus	S. stenops	The largest ornithischian reported from the quarry	Stegosaurus stenops
Miragaia	cf. M. longicollum	An isolated cervical plate from Utah, Brushy Basin Member	Miragaia longicollum
Miragaia	M. sp.	Multiple caudal spines, a dorsal rib and two chevrons from Utah, Brushy Basin Member	

==== Sauropods ====
Sauropods reported from the Cleveland-Lloyd Quarry
Genus	Species	Notes	Images
Apatosaurus	A. sp		Apatosaurus Camarasaurus skeleton
Barosaurus	B. sp		Apatosaurus Camarasaurus skeleton
Camarasaurus	C. lentus	3 skeletons were unearthed	Apatosaurus Camarasaurus skeleton
Diplodocus	D. sp		Apatosaurus Camarasaurus skeleton

==== Theropods ====
Theropods reported from the Cleveland-Lloyd Quarry
Genus	Species	Amount	Notes	Images
Allosaurus	A. fragilis	44 - 60	The largest theropod reported from the quarry	Allosaurus mounted skeleton Tanycolagreus
Ceratosaurus	C. dentisulcatus (may just represent the adult form of C. nasicornis)	1	The rarest theropod species in the quarry	Allosaurus mounted skeleton Tanycolagreus
Marshosaurus	M. bicentesimus	2		Allosaurus mounted skeleton Tanycolagreus
Stokesosaurus	S. clevelandi	2	The largest coelurosaur reported from the quarry	Allosaurus mounted skeleton Tanycolagreus
Tanycolagreus	T. topwilsoni	1	Remains originally referred to Stokesosaurus clevelandi.	Allosaurus mounted skeleton Tanycolagreus
Torvosaurus	T. tanneri	1		Allosaurus mounted skeleton Tanycolagreus

== See also ==
- List of national monuments of the United States
- La Brea Tar Pits
- List of dinosaur-bearing rock formations
- Predator trap

== Other sources ==
- Stokes, William J. (1945). A new quarry for Jurassic dinosaurs. Science. 101 (2614): 115–117. Bibcode:1945Sci...101..115S
- Stokes, W. L. (1985). The Cleveland-Lloyd Dinosaur Quarry: Window to the Past. U. S. Government Printing Office.
- Richmond, D. R. and Morris, T. H. (1996). The dinosaur death trap of the Cleveland-Lloyd Dinosaur Quarry, Emery County, Utah, in Morales, M., ed., The Continental Jurassic: Museum of Northern Arizona Bulletin 60, pp. 533–545.
- Joseph E. Peterson, Jonathan P. Warnock, Shawn L. Eberhart, Steven R. Clawson & Christopher R. Noto (2017). New data towards the development of a comprehensive taphonomic framework for the Late Jurassic Cleveland-Lloyd Dinosaur Quarry, Central Utah. PeerJ 5:e3368, doi: http://doi.org/10.7717/peerj.3368
- Hunt, Adrian P; Lucas, Spencer G.; Krainer, Karl; Spielmann, Justin (2006). The taphonomy of the Cleveland-Lloyd Dinosaur Quarry, Upper Jurassic Morrison Formation, Utah: a re-evaluation. In Foster, John R.; Lucas, Spencer G. Paleontology and Geology of the Upper Jurassic Morrison Formation. New Mexico Museum of Natural History and Science Bulletin, 36. Albuquerque, New Mexico: New Mexico Museum of Natural History and Science. pp. 57–65.
- Loewen, Mark A. (2003). Morphology, taxonomy, and stratigraphy of Allosaurus from the Upper Jurassic Morrison Formation. Journal of Vertebrate Paleontology. 23 (3, Suppl.): 72A. doi:10.1080/02724634.2003.10010538
