= Bezymyanny =

Bezymyanny (Russian: Безымянный; masculine), Bezymyannaya (Безымянная; feminine), or Bezymyannoye (Безымянное; neuter) is the name of several inhabited localities in Russia. The name literally means "nameless".

Urban localities

- Bezymyanny, Sakha Republic, an urban-type settlement in Aldansky District of the Sakha Republic

Rural localities

- Bezymyanny, Novosibirsk Oblast, a settlement in Kuybyshevsky District of Novosibirsk Oblast
- Bezymyanny, Orenburg Oblast, a settlement in Zelenodolsky Selsoviet of Kvarkensky District of Orenburg Oblast
- Bezymyanny, Rostov Oblast, a khutor in Leninskoye Rural Settlement of Zimovnikovsky District of Rostov Oblast
- Bezymyanny, Voronezh Oblast, a khutor in Peskovskoye Rural Settlement of Pavlovsky District of Voronezh Oblast
- Bezymyannoye, Amur Oblast, a selo in Raychikhinsky Rural Settlement of Bureysky District of Amur Oblast
- Bezymyannoye, Krasnodar Krai, a selo in Bezymyanny Rural Okrug of Goryachy Klyuch, Krasnodar Krai
- Bezymyannoye, Saratov Oblast, a selo in Engelssky District of Saratov Oblast
- Bezymyannoye, Smolensk Oblast, a village in Kaydakovskoye Rural Settlement of Vyazemsky District of Smolensk Oblast
- Bezymyannaya, Omsk Oblast, a village in Krasnoyarsky Rural Okrug of Bolsherechensky District of Omsk Oblast
- Bezymyannaya, Vologda Oblast, a village in Naumovsky Selsoviet of Verkhovazhsky District of Vologda Oblast
