= Tatyana Ustinova =

- Born: 14 November 1913
- Died: 4 September 2009 (aged 95)

Tatyana Ivanovna Ustinova (November 14, 1913, Alushta — September 4, 2009, Vancouver) was a Soviet geologist, who discovered the Valley of Geysers in Kamchatka.

== Biography ==
Tatyana Ustinova graduated from Kharkiv University and subsequently worked on projects in the Ural Mountains and Reserve Ilmen. In 1940 she was transferred to the Kronotsky Nature Reserve in Kamchatka together with her husband, Yury Averin. In April 1941, while accompanied by the Itelmen guide Anysyfor Pavlovich Krupenin, she found the Valley of Geysers. This was a major geological discovery as, prior to this, geysers were only known in Iceland, New Zealand, and the United States. Ustinova named the first geyser in Kamchatka Pevenets, Russian for "firstling".

Until 1946 Ustinova remained on the Kamchatka peninsula, researching the Valley of Geysers; her description of the geysers' eruptions and their locations was the basis of her master's thesis. She gave the names to the most powerful and impressive hot springs there. Later on she worked in Chişinău. In 1951, she published a book, Geysers of Kamchatka.

In 1989, Ustinova left her homeland to live in Canada along with her eldest daughter, Tatyana, and she died there on September 4, 2009.

== Death ==
Following Ustinova's testament, her ashes were buried in Valley of Geysers on August 5, 2010, 11 months and 2 days after her death.
