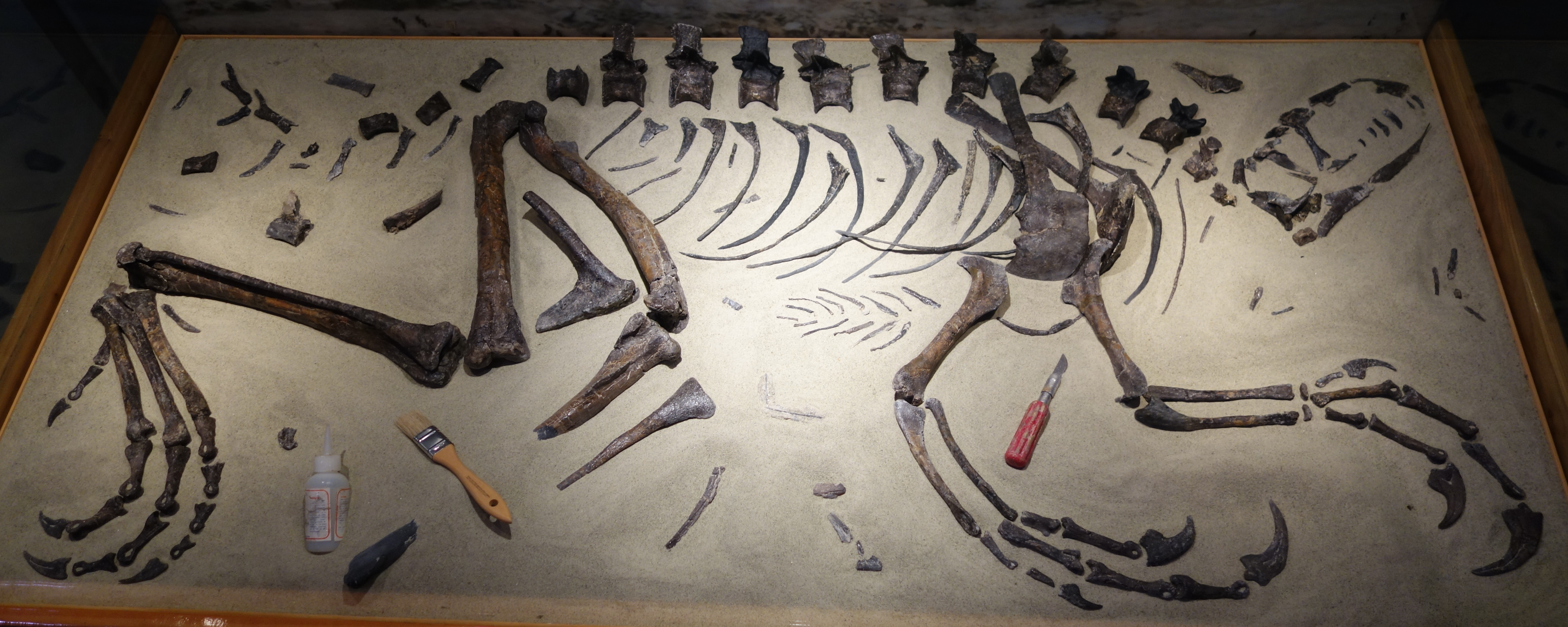
- Tanycolagreus holotype, North American Museum of Ancient Life

Scientific classification
- Kingdom: Animalia
- Phylum: Chordata
- Class: Reptilia
- Clade: Dinosauria
- Clade: Saurischia
- Clade: Theropoda
- Superfamily: †Tyrannosauroidea (?)
- Genus: †Tanycolagreus; Carpenter et al., 2005
- Species: †T. topwilsoni

Binomial name
- †Tanycolagreus topwilsoni Carpenter et al., 2005

= Tanycolagreus =

Tanycolagreus Temporal range: Late Jurassic, 153–150 Ma

Extinct genus of reptiles

Tanycolagreus is a genus of coelurosaurian theropod dinosaur from the Late Jurassic (Kimmeridgian to Tithonian) of the U.S. states of Wyoming, Utah, and Colorado.

== Discovery and naming ==
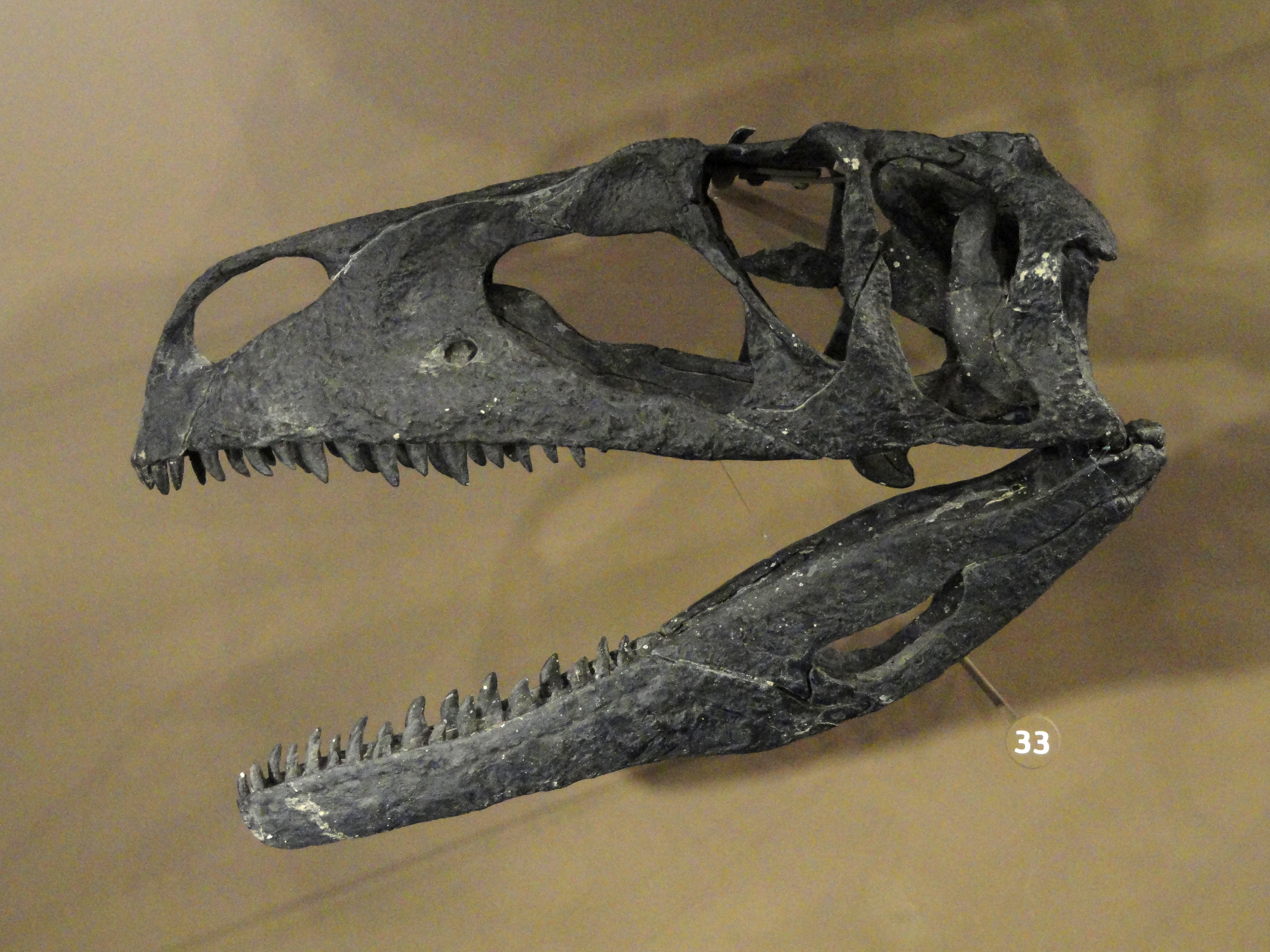
Restored skull cast

In 1995 Western Paleontological Laboratories, Inc. uncovered the partial skeleton of a small theropod at the Bone Cabin Quarry West locality, Albany County, Wyoming, from the Salt Wash Member of the Morrison Formation, dating to the Kimmeridgian-Tithonian. At first the find was considered to be a specimen of Coelurus but subsequent study indicated it represented a species new to science, that in 2001 was announced to be named Tanycolagreus topwilsoni. It was actually named and described by Kenneth Carpenter, Clifford Miles and Karen Cloward in 2005. The etymology of the generic name Tanycolagreus, suggested by Ben Creisler, is based upon the greater length of its forelimbs and hindlimbs compared to Coelurus. It is derived from the Greek prefix τανυ~, tany~: 'long, stretched out', κῶλον, kolon: 'limb' and ἀγρεύς, agreus: 'hunter'. The specific name honors George Eugene "Top" Wilson, the father of a benefactor financially supporting the scientific research.

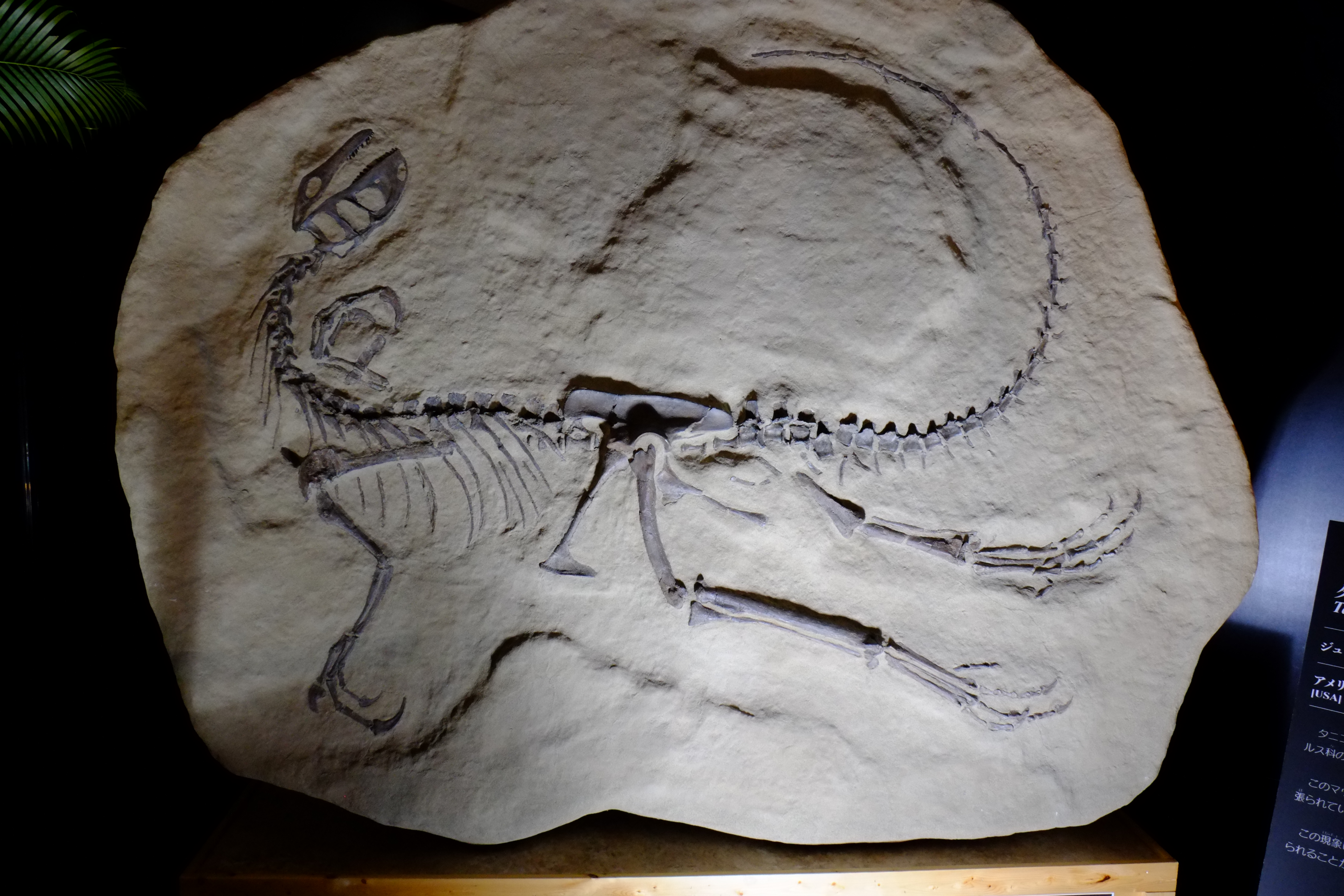
Restored skeleton

The fossil, holotype TPII 2000-09-29, was donated to science by an anonymous benefactor. It is part of the collection of Thanksgiving Point Institute, Inc. and displayed in the North American Museum of Ancient Life at Lehi, Utah. It includes an incomplete skull and mandible (lower jaws) and much of the postcranial skeleton, i.e. the parts behind the head. The skull of Tanycolagreus is less well known than its postcranial anatomy, and only the following elements have been found: left nasal, left lacrimal, left premaxilla and one premaxillary tooth, left postorbital, left quadratojugal, incomplete left squamosal, right quadrate, right splenial, left articular, and two cheek teeth. A paratype has been assigned to the species: specimen AMNH 587 consisting of an incomplete hand also collected from Bone Cabin Quarry and originally in 1903 by Henry Fairfield Osborn referred to Ornitholestes hermanni. Two other fossils have been referred to Tanycolagreus: UUVP 2999, a premaxilla, originally in 1974 referred to Stokesosaurus clevelandi, from the Cleveland-Lloyd Quarry of Utah; and USNM 5737, a pair of distal pubes from Colorado earlier in 1920 by Charles Whitney Gilmore referred to Coelurus. These specimens are from the later Brushy Basin Member.

Tanycolagreus is present in stratigraphic zone 2 of the Morrison. Remains possibly referrable to Stokesosaurus have been recovered from stratigraphic zone 5 of the Morrison Formation. A life restoration of Tanycolagreus is also on display at the North American Museum of Ancient Life, where it is portrayed as preying upon a small ornithischian dinosaur, Nanosaurus agilis.

== Description ==
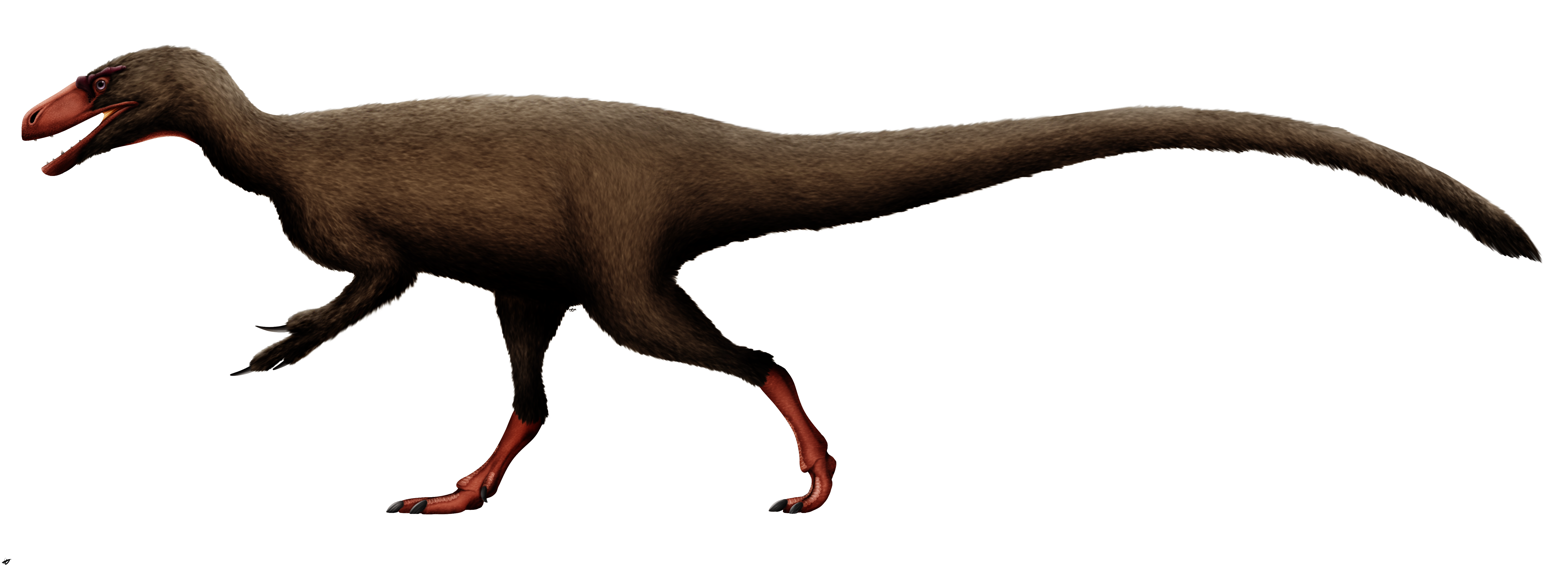
Tanycolagreus life restoration

Carpenter et al. (2005, pp. 43–44) determined that the holotype of Tanycolagreus represents a subadult individual which measured approximately 3.3 meters (11 ft) long in life. However, one of the referred fossils, the premaxilla from the Cleveland-Lloyd Quarry, would have belonged to a larger individual, measuring 4 meters (13 ft) long. In 2010 Gregory S. Paul estimated the weight of a four-meter-long animal at 120 kilograms (260 lb). It cannot be determined whether or not the Cleveland-Lloyd specimen represents a fully mature adult, so the upper size limit for the taxon remains unknown.

The head of Tanycolagreus is large, elongated and rectangular in profile due to a blunt snout. The leg is rather long and lightly built.

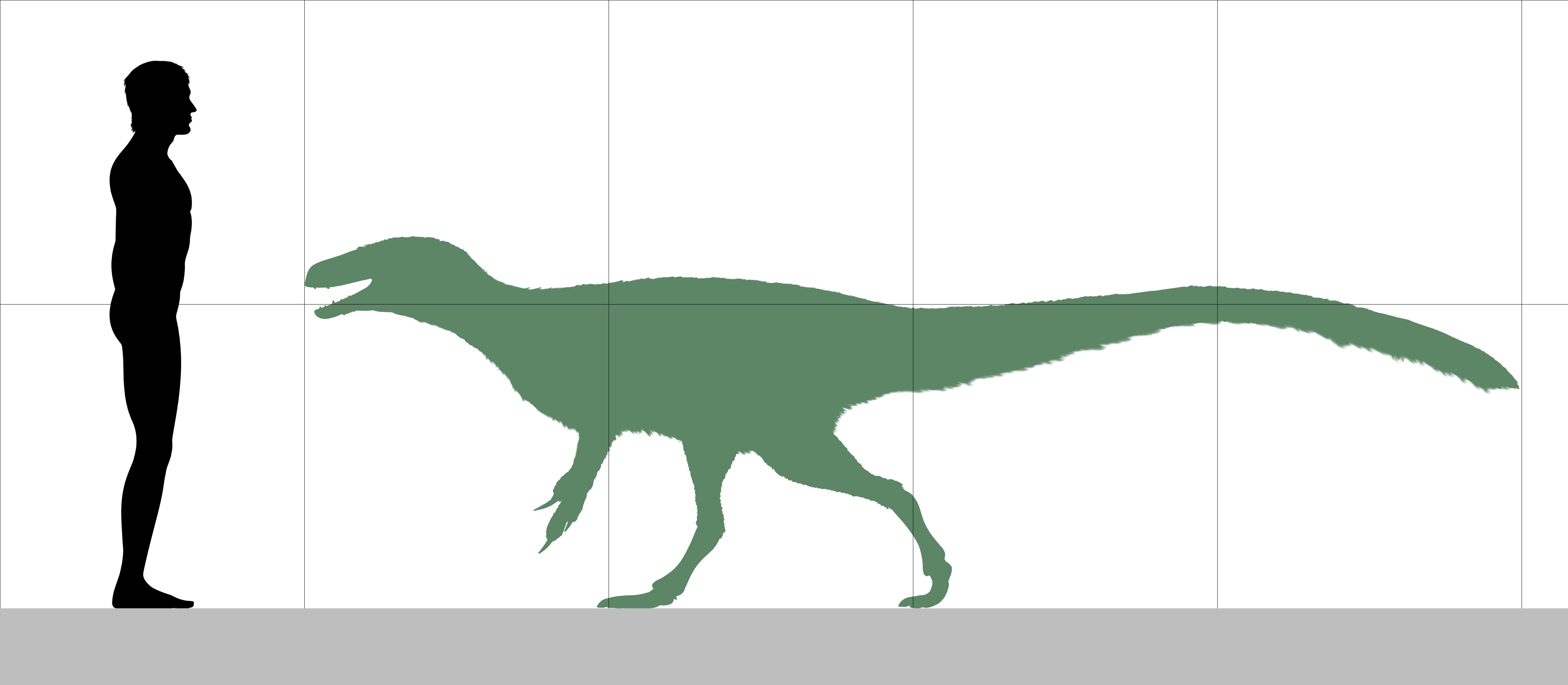
Estimated size of Tanycolagreus, based on Carpenter

Carpenter et al. (2005; pp. 27 & 29) diagnosed Tanycolagreus topwilsoni as follows: "Medium-sized tetanuran having short, deep-bodied premaxilla pierced by narial foramen at base of nasal process, orbital process on postorbital, T-shaped quadratojugal, centrodiapophyseal lamina on dorsals. Differs from Coelurus in the absence of pleurocoel on anterior dorsals; posterior caudal prezygapophyses elongated to one-third centrum length, rather than short; straight, rather than sigmoidal, humeral shaft; bowed, rather than straight, radius; flat-bottomed rather than arced pubic foot; straight rather than sigmoidal femoral shaft; metatarsal length subequal to humeral length, rather than 1.75 times humeral length. Differs from Ornitholestes in straight anterior margin of premaxilla, rather than rounded; T-shaped rather than L-shaped quadratojugal; elongate neural spine; posterior caudal prezygapophyses only one-third centrum length, rather than one-half centrum length; bowed, slender radius, rather than straight, robust radius".

The single premaxillary tooth preserved with the holotype is badly damaged, but does exhibit the asymmetrical cross-section typical in theropod teeth; the cheek teeth are too poorly preserved to show any detail. In the foot the second toe is slightly hyperextendable but does not carry an enlarged claw.

== Classification ==
Carpenter e.a. originally assigned Tanycolagreus to the Coeluridae. Carpenter et al. (2005, p. 44) state that, of the other known Morrison theropods, this genus most closely resembles Coelurus, though it retains more "primitive" features. A detailed phylogenetic analysis in 2007 by Philip Senter including Tanycolagreus showed it had a basal position in the Tyrannosauroidea. Later analyses indicated a basal position in the Coelurosauria.

In their 2025 revision of the enigmatic Brazilian coelurosaurians Mirischia and Santanaraptor, Delcourt et al. consistently supported a Proceratosauridae clade. In equal-weight phylogenetic analyses, this group also tentatively included Tanycolagreus. However, in implied-weight phylogenetic analyses Tanycolagreus grouped with Mirischia, Santanaraptor and Juratyrant close to but not within Proceratosauridae. Unlike previous analyses, they found Proceratosauridae (and the Juratyrant clade in implied-weight analyses) to be a very ancient lineage of Maniraptoromorpha and outside Tyrannosauroidea.
