= Valley of Geysers =

Geothermal feature in Kamchatka, Russia

- Geyser field
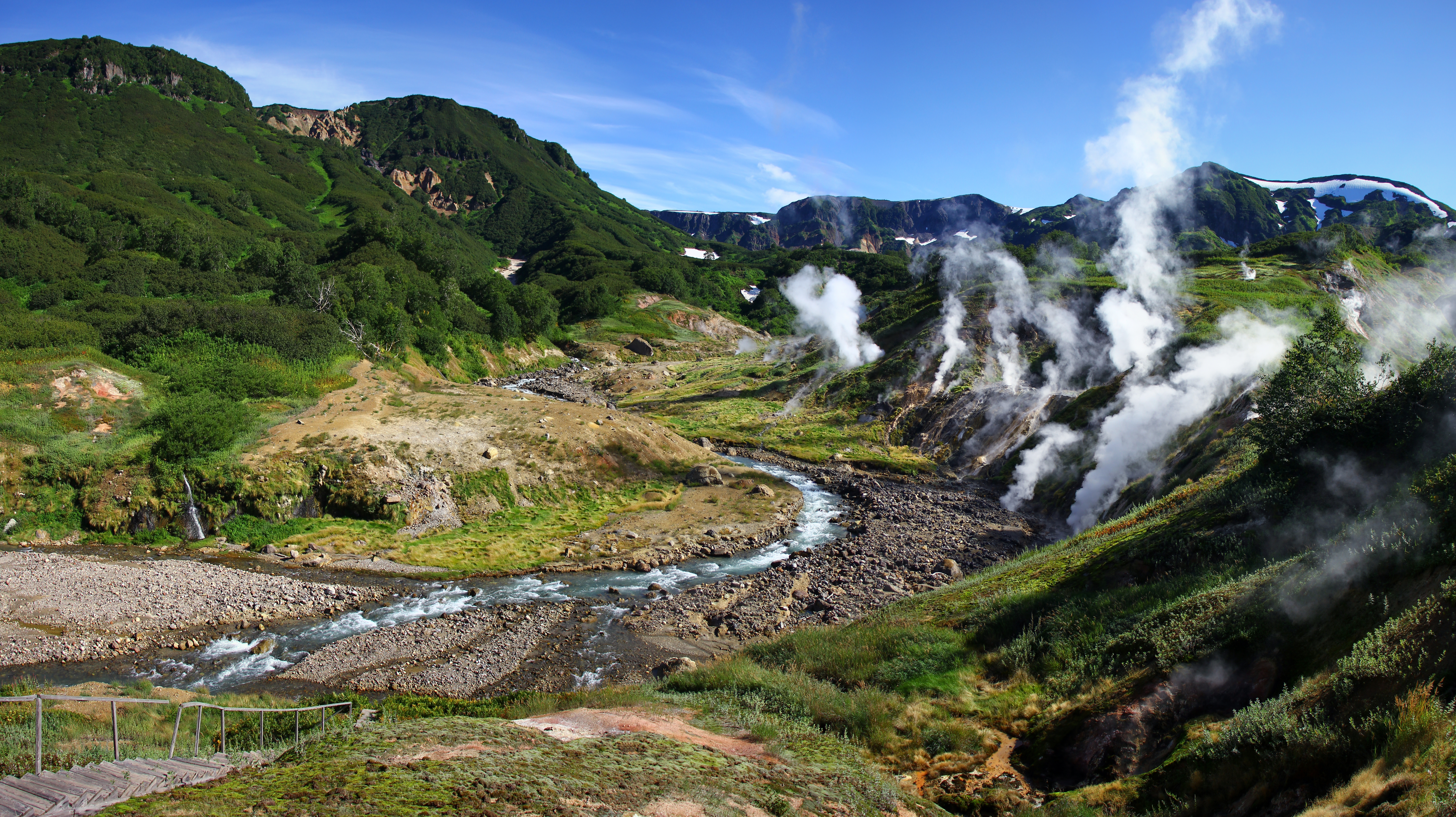
- The Valley of Geysers in 2018

- Location in Kamchatka Krai, Russia
- Coordinates: 54.431°N 160.139°E
- Location: Kamchatka Peninsula, Russia

The Valley of Geysers (Russian: Долина гейзеров) is a geyser field on Kamchatka Peninsula, Russia, and has the second-largest concentration of geysers in the world. This six-kilometre-long (3.7 mi) basin with approximately ninety geysers and many hot springs is situated on the Kamchatka Peninsula in the Russian Far East, predominantly on the left bank of the ever-deepening Geysernaya River, into which geothermal waters flow from a relatively young stratovolcano, Kikhpinych. Temperatures have been found to be 250 °C (482 °F), 500 m (1,640 ft) below the caldera ground. It is part of the Kronotsky Nature Reserve, which, in turn, is incorporated into the World Heritage Site "Volcanoes of Kamchatka". The valley is difficult to reach, with helicopters providing the only feasible means of transport.

== History ==
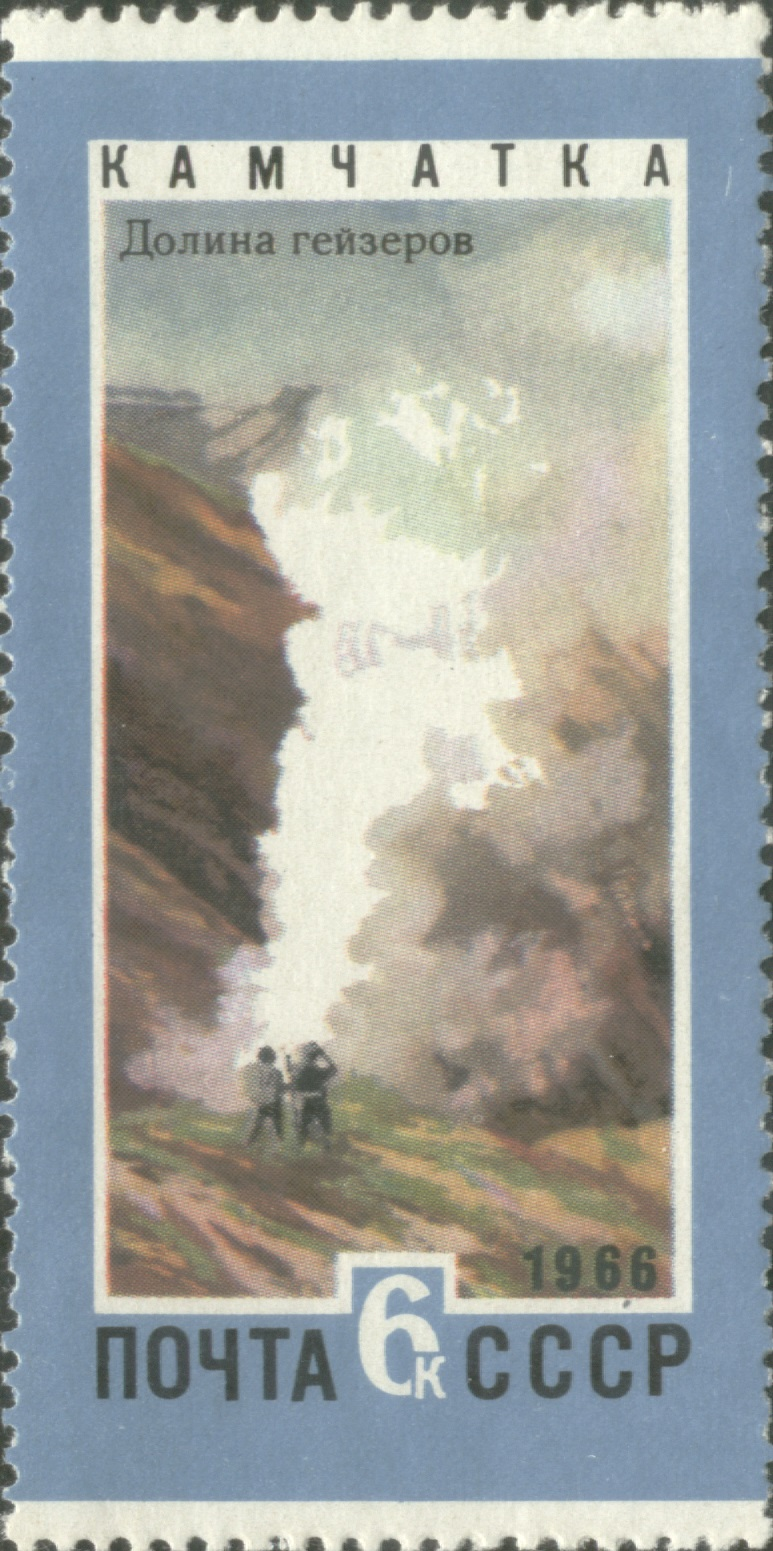
A Soviet postage stamp from 1966

The "pulsating" geysers of Kamchatka were discovered by a local scientist, Tatyana Ustinova, in 1941. She published her findings fourteen years later, but there was little exploration of the area until 1972. A systematic survey was undertaken in the mid-1970s, and an automatic monitoring system was introduced in 1990. Over thirty geysers were given names; among these was the Giant geyser (Velikan), capable of producing a jet of water reaching up to 40 meters (131 ft). From the 1980s, the area was promoted across the Soviet Union as one of the tourist magnets of Kamchatka and the Russian Far East. Foreign tourists were allowed into the valley in 1991. About 3,000 tourists visited the site annually.

== 2007 Mudflow damage and aftermath ==
On June 3, 2007, a massive mudflow inundated two thirds of the valley. Oleg Mitvol of Russia's Service for the Oversight of Natural Resources said "we witnessed a unique natural event, but the consequences of such a natural catastrophe are irreversible." The World Heritage Site also expressed its deep concern over the issue. "This is tragic for humankind, in that we have lost one of the great natural wonders of the world", the World Wildlife Fund spokesman commented. On June 5, it was reported that a thermal lake was forming above the valley. The landslide occurred during filming of the documentary Wild Russia; it features footage of before and after the disaster.

The extent of permanent change was less than originally thought. By June 9, 2007, waters had receded somewhat, exposing some of the submerged features. Velikan (Giant) Geyser, one of the field's largest, was not buried in the slide and remained active.

Heavy rainfalls in 2013 contributed to the revival of the natural monument. A new landslide destroyed the natural dam, freeing up the springs. When the water subsided, the geysers started up again.

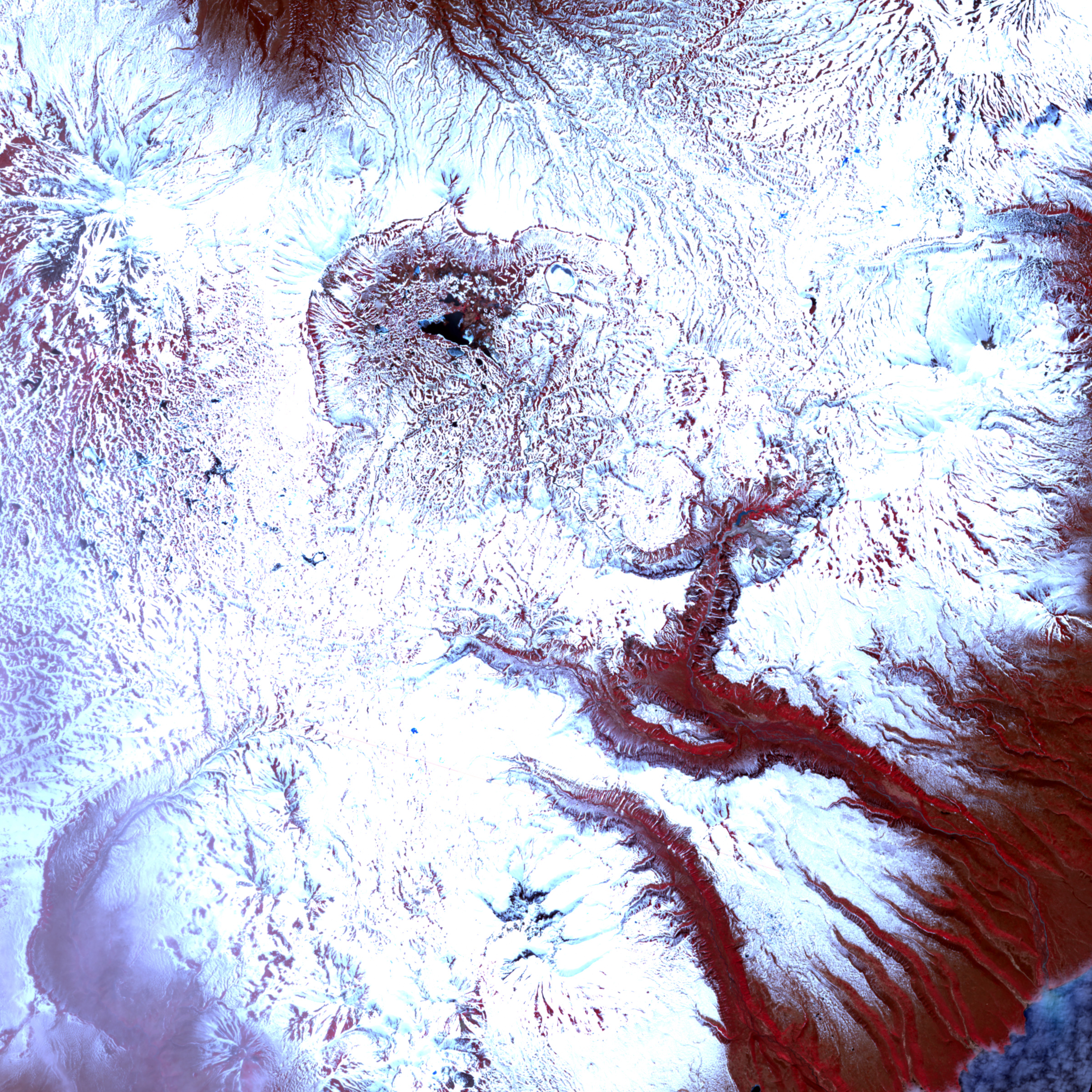
Infrared image of the landslide (20 June 2007)

Bolshoi (Large) geyser eruption
