= Bezymyannaya, Vologda Oblast =

Bezymyannaya Безымянная
- Village
- Location within Vologda Oblast Location within Russia
- Coordinates: 60°43′N 42°18′E
- Country: Russia
- Region: Vologda Oblast
- District: Verkhovazhsky District

Population
  - Total: 111
- Time zone: UTC+3:00

Bezymyannaya (Russian: Безымянная) is a rural locality (a village) in Nizhen-Vazhskoye Rural Settlement, Verkhovazhsky District, Vologda Oblast, Russia. The population was 111 as of 2002. Its name is Russian for "nameless" (feminine singular).

== Geography ==
Bezymyannaya is located on the right bank of the Sivchuga River, 17 km east of Verkhovazhye (the district's administrative centre) by road. Yalnichevskaya is the nearest rural locality.
