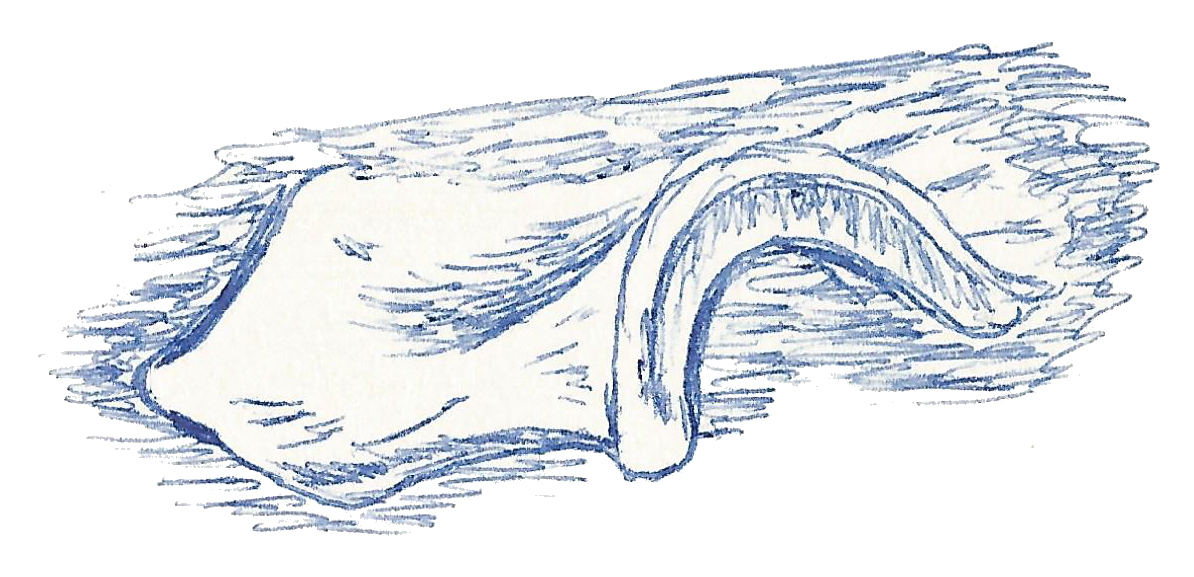
- Drawing of BMNH R83
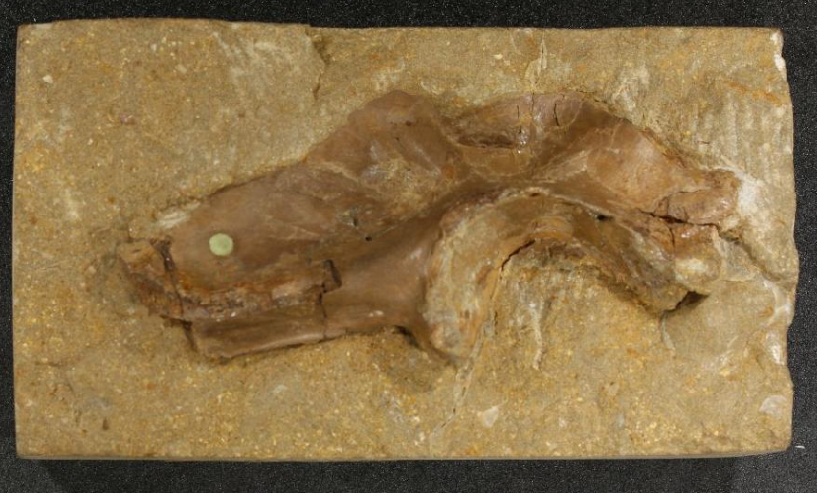
- Photograph of BMNH R83

Scientific classification
- Kingdom: Animalia
- Phylum: Chordata
- Class: Reptilia
- Clade: Dinosauria
- Clade: Saurischia
- Clade: Theropoda
- Clade: Orionides
- Clade: Avetheropoda
- Clade: Coelurosauria
- Genus: †Iliosuchus; Huene, 1932

Type species
- Iliosuchus incognitus Huene, 1932

Synonyms
- Megalosaurus incognitus (von Huene, 1932 [originally Iliosuchus])

= Iliosuchus =

Iliosuchus Temporal range: Bathonian ~168–166 Ma

Extinct genus of dinosaurs

Iliosuchus (meaning "crocodile-hipped") is a genus of theropod dinosaur known from Bathonian-aged (168.3-166.1 mya) rocks of England. It was perhaps 2 metres (6.6 ft) long.

The only known fossils of this genus are three ilia (BMNH R83, OUM J29780 and OUM J28971) from the Stonesfield Slate, Oxfordshire, England. From the holotype BMNH R83, Friedrich von Huene described and named the only species, I. incognitus, in 1932. The generic name is derived from the ilium and Greek Souchos, the crocodile god. The specific name means "unknown" in Latin. Another species, I. clevelandi, was proposed in 1976 by Peter Galton, who assigned Stokesosaurus clevelandi to Iliosuchus, but this has found no acceptance among other researchers; in 1980 Galton himself withdrew his opinion.

The Iliosuchus ilia were very small, with a length of nine to ten centimeters, having a vertical supra–acetabular ridge on the surface, similar to tyrannosaurids and many other predatory dinosaurs belonging to the group Tetanurae, including Piatnitzkysaurus and Megalosaurus. Such fragmentary and incomplete material is inadequate for accurate classification; nonetheless, Iliosuchus has sometimes been considered a tyrannosaurid ancestor. This is unlikely to be correct as the bones cannot be distinguished from small individuals of Megalosaurus, a megalosaurid. Whatever the case, Iliosuchus is not diagnostic and is therefore dubious. If Iliosuchus incognitus is a tyrannosauroid, it would be a possible ancestor to Proceratosaurus, the earliest recognized tyrannosauroid, and would be the earliest of the tyrannosauroids.

== See also ==
- Timeline of tyrannosaur research
