= Predator trap =

Type of natural hazard

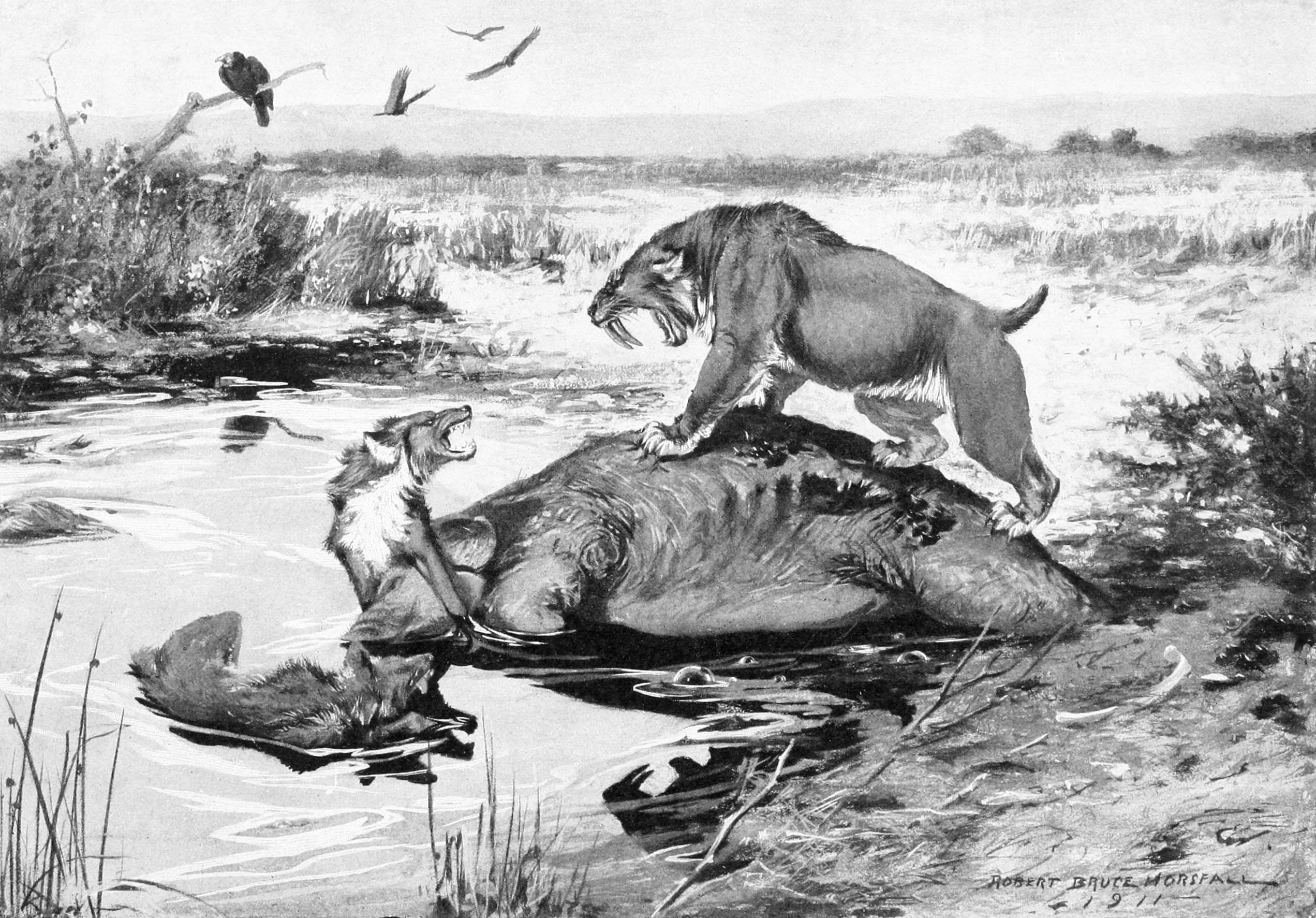
Smilodon fatalis and Aenocyon dirus fight over a Mammuthus columbi carcass in the La Brea Tar Pits, risking becoming trapped themselves

A predator trap is a natural hazard where prey animals become trapped or incapacitated, and the attracted predators suffer the same fate. More predators, scavengers, insects and birds become attracted to this mounting accumulation of carrion, until a wide variety of animals are caught and ultimately killed by the hazard. This may happen many times over. Typically, the number of lured predators will greatly outnumber the prey, thus providing the name.

A famous example is the La Brea Tar Pits site, where predators were attracted to struggling animals that had become trapped in tar. It has also been speculated that the mudstone deposits at the Cleveland-Lloyd Dinosaur Quarry may have been a predator trap, although more recent research has questioned this hypothesis.

The "Valley of Death" near the Kikhpinych volcano in Russia forms a predator trap every spring when it fills with poisonous volcanic gases, initially killing birds, which then attract larger predators, which also succumb to the gas.
