= Yalnichevskaya =

Yalnichevskaya Яльничевская
- Village
- Location within Vologda Oblast Location within Russia
- Coordinates: 60°43′N 42°18′E
- Country: Russia
- Region: Vologda Oblast
- District: Verkhovazhsky District
- Time zone: UTC+3:00

Yalnichevskaya (Russian: Яльничевская) is a rural locality (a village) in Nizhne-Vazhskoye Rural Settlement, Verkhovazhsky District, Vologda Oblast, Russia. The population was 10 as of 2002.

== Geography ==
Yalnichevskaya is located 18 km east of Verkhovazhye (the district's administrative centre) by road. Pogost Ilyinsky is the nearest rural locality.
