= Kikhpinych =

Stratovolcano in eastern Kamchatka, Russia

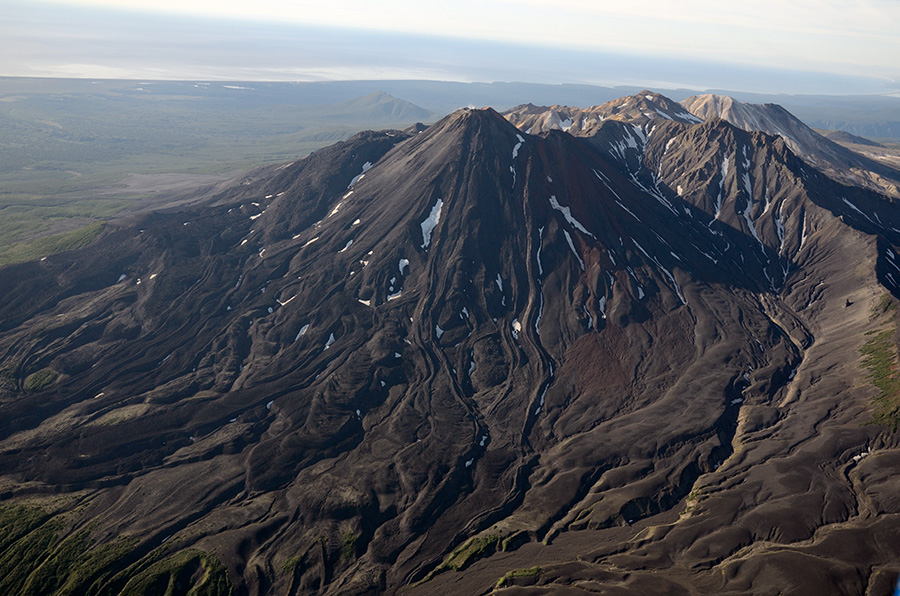

Highest point
- Elevation: 1,515 m (4,970 ft)
- Coordinates: 54.487°N 160.253°E

Geography
- Location within Kamchatka Krai
- Location: Kamchatka, Russia
- Parent range: Eastern Range

Geology
- Mountain type: Stratovolcanoes
- Last eruption: 1550

Kikhpinych (Russian: Кихпиныч) is a stratovolcano located in the eastern part of the Kamchatka Peninsula, which feeds the famous Valley of Geysers.

At its foot is a 2-by-0.5-km (1.2-by-0.3-mi) area known as the "Valley of Death" (also known as Dolina Smerti (Russian: Долина Смерти)), where volcanic gases accumulate and kill birds and mammals that enter the valley. Research in the 1970s and 1980s showed that a mix of hydrogen sulphide, carbon dioxide, sulphur dioxide, and carbon disulphide was produced by the volcano, gathering in a valley area where it could not be easily dispersed by winds, creating a predator trap. The gas forms in spring when the snow melts, first killing birds and rodents which drink at the river, followed by foxes, bears, lynxes and other carnivores which are attracted to the carrion. Bacteria are likewise unable to survive the gas, slowing the decomposition of carrion significantly.

The Valley of Death was first discovered in 1975, after volcanologist and seismologist Vladimir Leonidovich Leonov found the area full of carrion.

== See also ==
- List of volcanoes in Russia
