= James Henry Madsen =

American vertebrate paleontologist and geologist

James "Jim" Henry Madsen Jr.
- Born: 28 July 1932; Murray, Utah
- Died: 28 November 2009 (aged 77); Salt Lake City, Utah
- Education: University of Utah
- Known for: paleontology, Allosaurus, Ceratosaurus
- Parent(s): James Henry Madsen Sr., Eva Anna Weidner

James "Jim" Henry Madsen Jr. (July 28, 1932 – November 28, 2009) was an American vertebrate paleontologist and geologist and main leader of excavations at the Cleveland-Lloyd Dinosaur Quarry in the 1960s. Madsen primarily worked to describe skeletons of Allosaurus from the quarry, eventually getting the site to become a National Natural Landmark in 1965 and a national monument after his death.

== Biography ==
James Henry Madsen Jr. was born to James Henry Madsen Sr. and Eva Anne Weidner on July 28, 1932, in Murray, Utah and married his wife Susan Sowles in 1956. Madsen Jr. had two children and four grandchildren, with a nephew and two nieces.

== Paleontology ==
When Madsen graduated the University of Utah in 1959, few careers were open for geologists until the geologist and paleontologist William Lee Stokes selected Madsen to oversee the excavation of Upper Jurassic dinosaur fossils from the Cleveland-Lloyd Dinosaur Quarry in 1960. Madsen led excavations of the site for 5 years, recovering over 14,000 fossils, making it one of the most productive dinosaur quarries in the world. In 1974, Madsen named a new genus and species of theropod dinosaur from Cleveland-Lloyd based on 2 partial ilia, naming it Stokesosaurus clevelandi after his advisor and the Cleveland Museum of Natural History. Of the 14,000 fossils found at Cleveland-Lloyd, 10,000 were of the large carnivorous theropod Allosaurus with elements from a young juvenile to an old adult represented that were later described by Madsen in 1976. Madsen along with Samuel Paul Welles published an osteology of two Ceratosaurus species they named, C. magnicornis & C. dentisulcatus, from Grand Junction, Colorado and Cleveland-Lloyd respectively in 2000.

== Public appearances ==
Madsen was featured on 2 episodes of the History channel television series Jurassic Fight Club in 2008, where he spoke about Allosaurus, Ceratosaurus, and other Upper Jurassic American dinosaurs featured in the show.

== Legacy ==
In 2019, Madsen's student Daniel Chure and Mark Loewen described a new species of Allosaurus, which they named Allosaurus jimmadseni after Madsen's work on Allosaurus from Cleveland Lloyd Dinosaur Quarry.
