= Bezymyannoye, Amur Oblast =

Bezymyannoye Безымянное
- Selo
- Location within Amur Oblast Location within Russia
- Coordinates: 49°45′N 129°04′E
- Country: Russia
- Region: Amur Oblast
- District: Bureysky District
- Time zone: UTC+9:00

Bezymyannoye (Russian: Безымянное) is a rural locality (a selo) in Raychikhinsky Selsoviet of Bureysky District, Amur Oblast, Russia. The population was 106 as of 2018. There are 8 streets. Its name is Russian for "nameless" (neuter singular).

== Geography ==
Bezymyannoye is located on the right bank of the Kupriyanikha River, 68 km west of Novobureysky (the district's administrative centre) by road. Staraya Raychikha is the nearest rural locality.
