= William Lee Stokes =

American geologist and paleontologist

William Lee Stokes (March 27, 1915, Black Hawk, Carbon County, Utah - December 12, 1994) was a geologist and paleontologist who is best known for his work at Cleveland-Lloyd Dinosaur Quarry in Emery County, Utah. William Stokes lived to be 79 and was survived by his wife Betty Stokes, his two daughters, Patricia Stokes and Betty Lee Huff; a son, William M. Stokes, and several grandchildren. The dinosaur Stokesosaurus was named after him.

Stokes graduated from Brigham Young University with a B.S. in 1937 and M.S. in 1938. He earned a Doctor of Philosophy degree in geology from Princeton University in 1941.

Stokes, a Latter-day Saint, wrote extensively about science and religion, and against Young Earth creationism. In spite of his scientific qualifications and record, many of his manuscripts went unpublished. One that did, The Genesis Answer, was nominated by the publisher, Prentice-Hall, for the American Academy of Religion's Award for Excellence. His writings did find at least a limited audience, as Elder John K. Carmack, a member of the LDS hierarchy, nominated him for a Templeton Prize in 1991. He was nominated the James E. Talmage Scientific Achievement award from BYU in the 1980s.

Stokes gave a pro-evolution lecture, "Which? Genesis or Geology?" which was printed in the advance issue of the June 8, 1973 Church News, but was edited out and replaced for the public printing.

== Publications ==
- Dinosaur National Monument, past and present, January 1, 1949
- Sedimentary Properties of Salt Wash Sandstones as Related to Primary Structures, 1952/1953
- The Creation Scriptures: A Witness for God in the Scientific Age, 1979
- The Genesis Code, 1981
- The Genesis Answer: A Scientist's Testament for Divine Creation, 1984
- The Cleveland-Lloyd Dinosaur Quarry: Window to the Past, 1985
- Evolution: the Scriptures Say Yes, 1987
- So God Created Man: Latter-day Alternatives, 1988
- Geology of Utah, 1988
- Joseph Smith and the Creation, 1991
- Scriptures for the Age of Science, 1992
- Scenes of the Plateau Lands and How They Came to Be, 1969
