= Gastralia =

Protective covering of the ventral area of a vertebrate

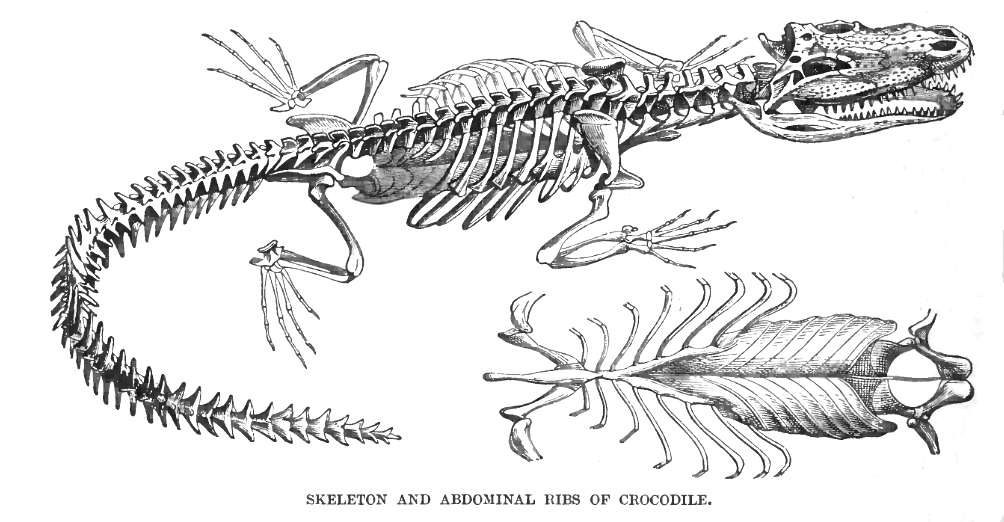
Crocodiles are among the few modern animals with gastralia

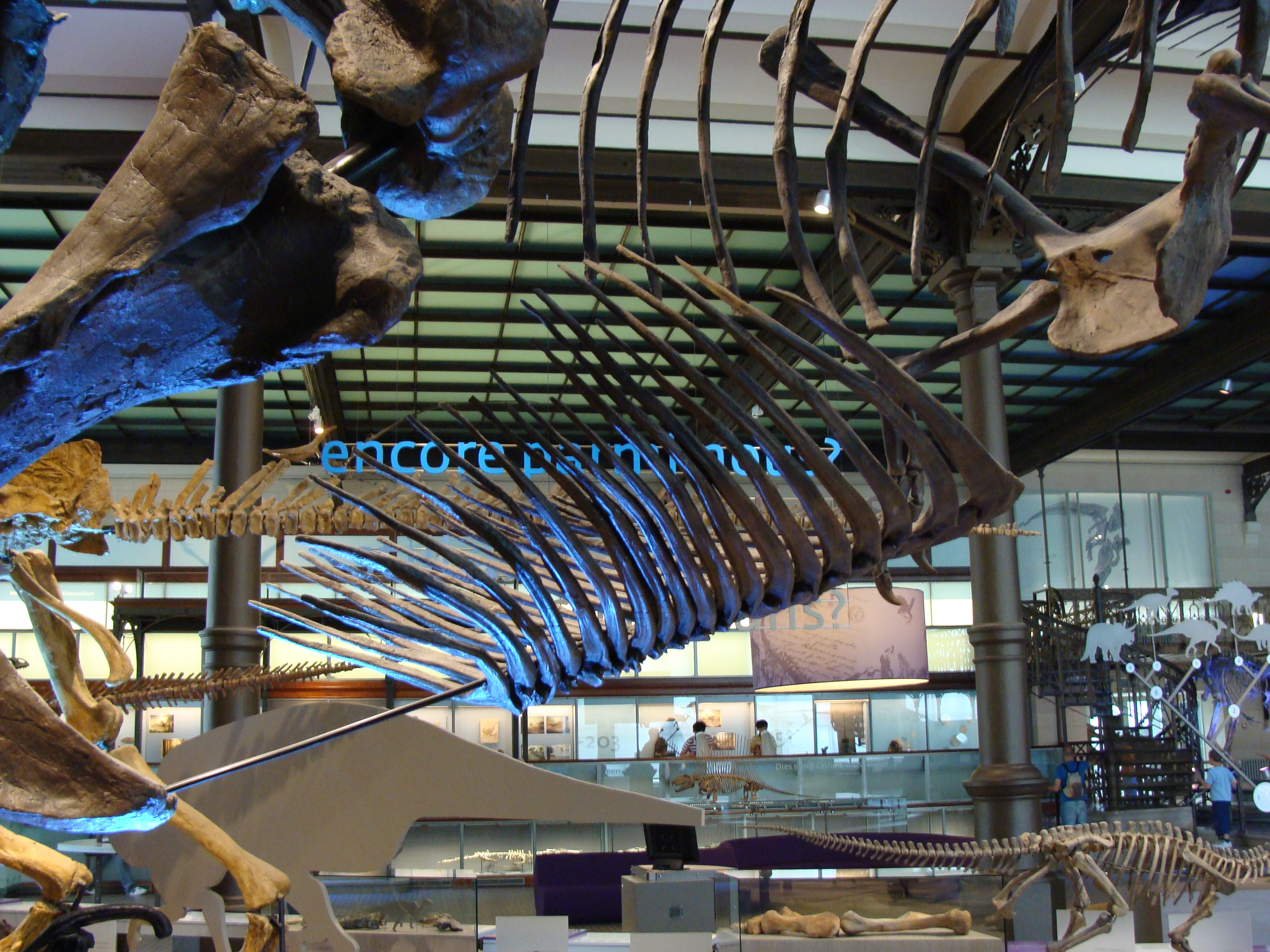
Tyrannosaurus gastralia

Gastralia (sing.: gastralium), or abdominal ribs, are dermal bones found in the ventral body wall of modern crocodilians and tuatara, and many prehistoric tetrapods. They are found between the sternum and pelvis (collectively forming the gastral basket), and do not articulate with the vertebrae. In these reptiles, gastralia provide support for the abdomen and attachment sites for abdominal muscles.

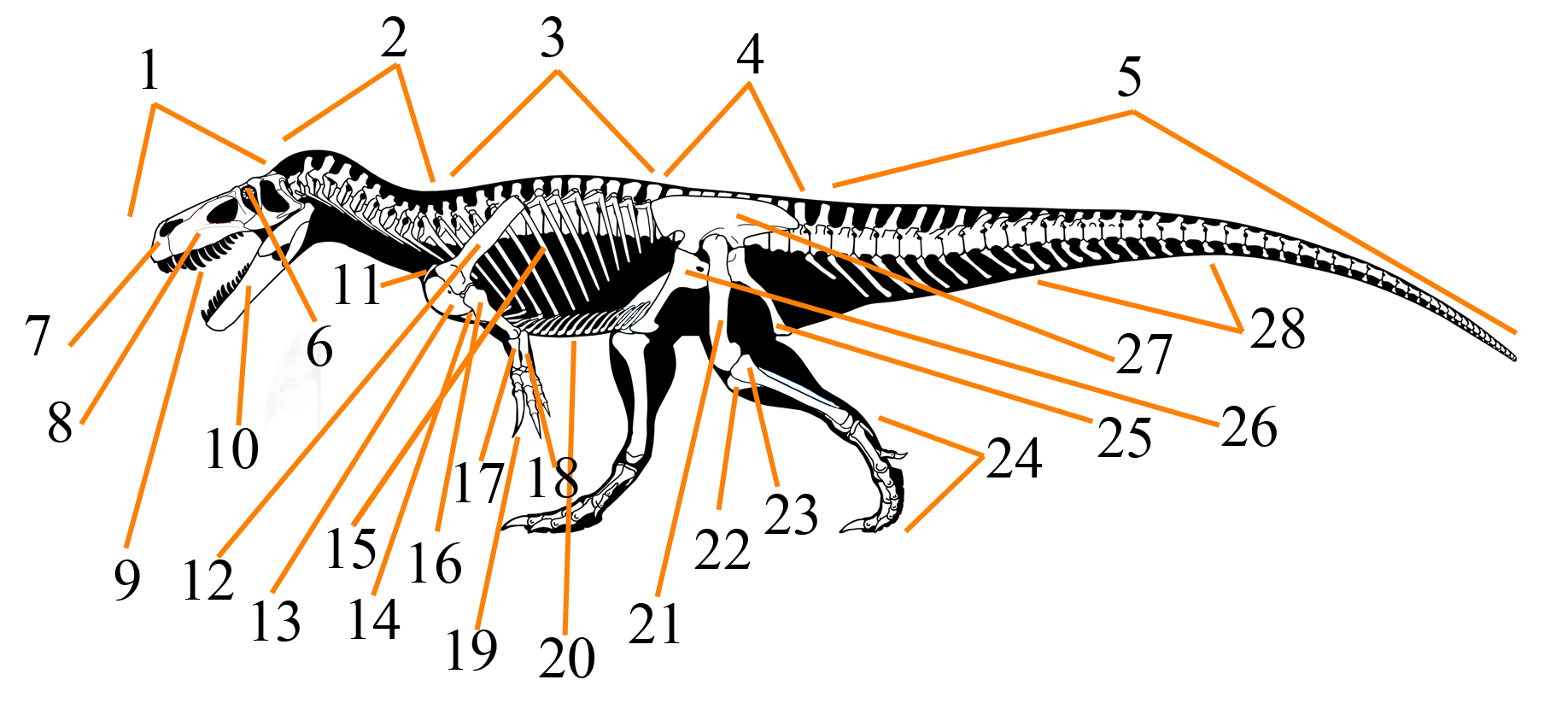
Diagram of the dinosaur Torvosaurus, with the gastral basket labelled "20"

The possession of gastralia may be ancestral for Tetrapoda and were possibly derived from the ventral scales found in animals like rhipidistians, labyrinthodonts, and Acanthostega, Similar, but not homologous cartilagenous elements, are found in the ventral body walls of lizards and anurans. These structures have been referred to as inscriptional ribs, based on their alleged association with the inscriptiones tendinae (the tendons that form the six pack in humans). However, the terminology for these gastral-like structures remains confused. Both types, along with sternal ribs (ossified costal cartilages), have been referred to as abdominal ribs, a term with limited usefulness that should be avoided. The posterior part of the plastron (lower part of the shell) of turtles is thought to be formed of heavily modified gastralia.

Gastralia are also present in a variety of extinct animals, including theropod and prosauropod dinosaurs, pterosaurs, plesiosaurs, choristoderes and in some early synapsids. In dinosaurs, the elements articulate with each other in a sort of zig-zag along the midline and may have aided in respiration. Gastralia are known to be present in primitive ornithischian and sauropodomorph dinosaurs. However gastralia are only known from heterodontosaurid ornithschians, and gastralia are lost in eusauropodan sauropods.

== Terminology ==
The term "gastralia" was proposed by Georg Baur in 1898. They had previously been termed "abdominal ribs", but because the term "abdominal ribs" has been applied to various structures, and the gastralia are not true ribs, this is not considered an appropriate term. The articulated sequence of gastralia in an animal is collectively referred to as the "gastral basket". A single element may be referred to as a gastralium or a gastrale.

In turtles, where the gastralia are incorporated into the plastron, each pair of gastralia gets a distinct name: the hyoplastra, hypoplastra, xiphiplastra, and in some taxa the mesoplastra.

== Taxonomic distribution ==
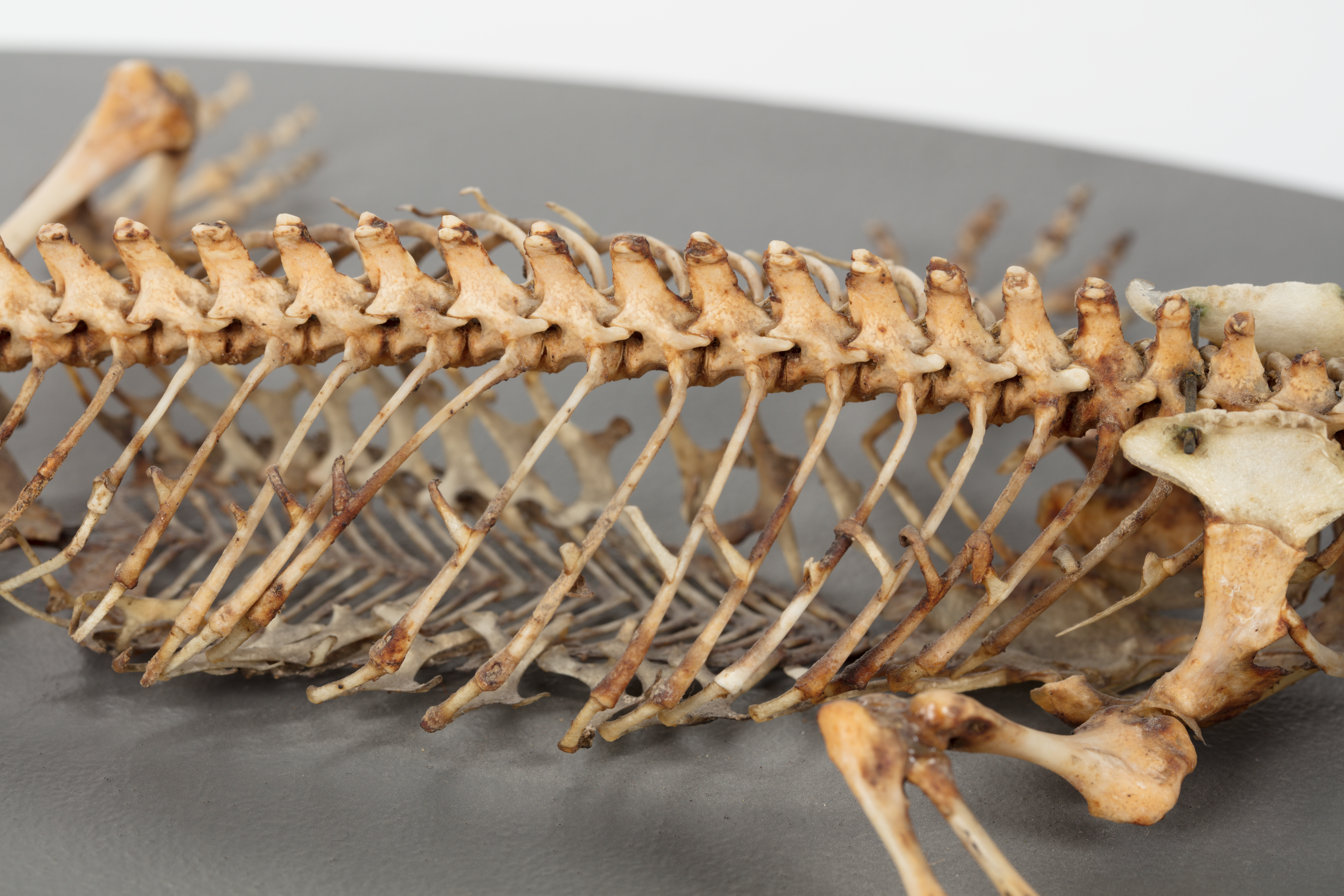
Gastralia in the belly of a tuatara (Sphenodon punctatus) skeleton

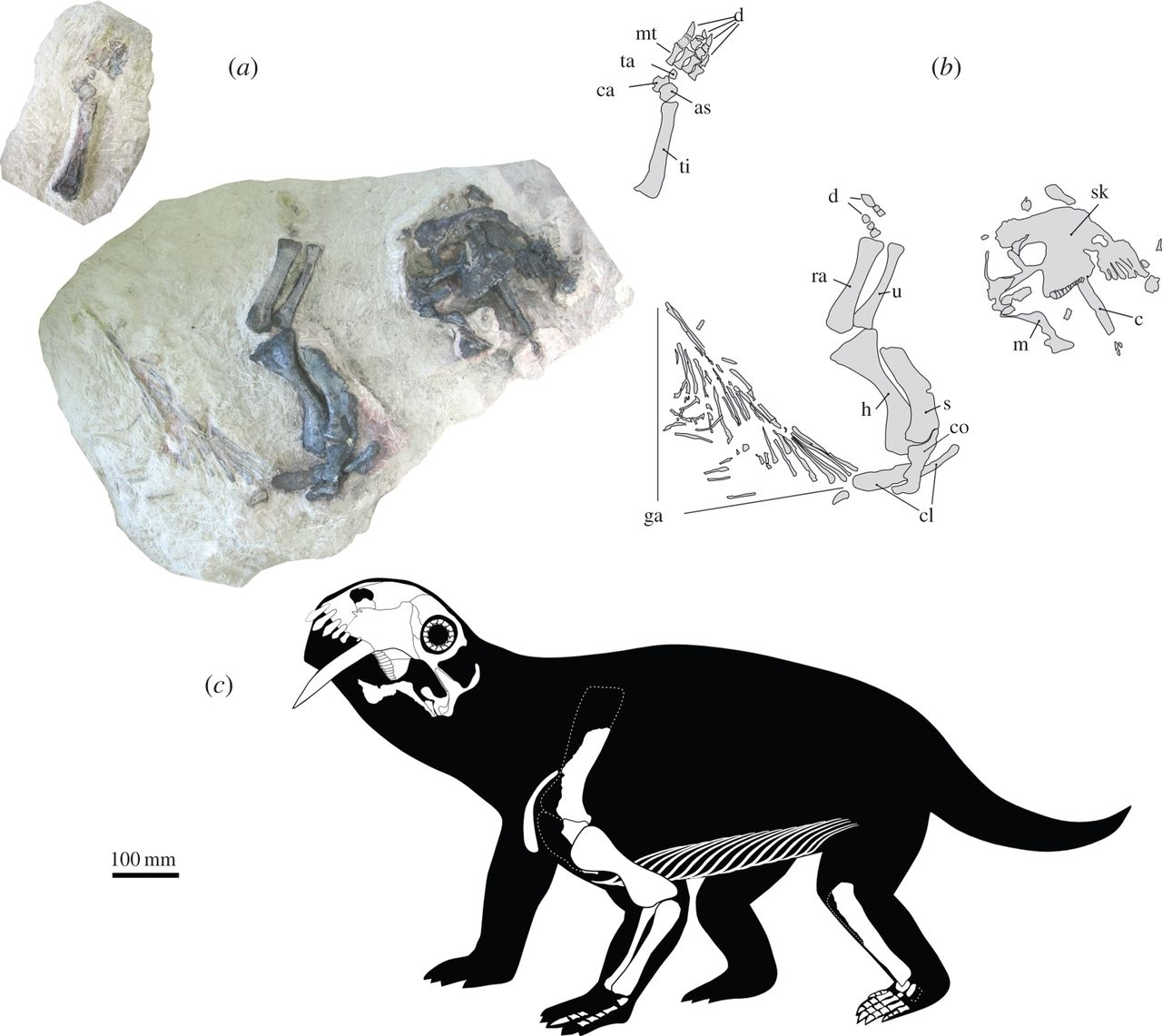
Diagram of gastralia in the early therapsid Tiarajudens

Gastralia were ancestrally present in amniotes, but have been lost in many groups. Among extant taxa, they are only present in crocodylians and the tuatara, and in modified form as part of the plastron of turtles. Gastralia are rarely preserved in therapsids, but have been identified in some dinocephalians and gorgonopsians and several anomodonts. However, they were probably genuinely absent in some dicynodonts, therocephalians, and cynodonts. Most ornithischian dinosaurs lacked gastralia, but heterodontosaurids, one of the earliest-branching lineages of ornithischians, retained them. Sauropods have been considered to lack gastralia. Elements interpreted as gastralia have been rarely found in sauropods, but it has been argued that these elements are more convincingly interpreted as sternal ribs. Modern birds lack gastralia, but they were present in early lineages of birds, as in other theropods.

== Pathology ==
The Allosaurus fragilis specimen USNM 8367 contained several gastralia which preserve evidence of healed fractures near their middle. Some of the fractures were poorly healed and "formed pseudoarthroses." An apparent subadult male Allosaurus fragilis was reported by Laws to have extensive pathologies. The possible subadult A. jimmadseni specimen MOR 693 also had pathological gastralia. The left scapula and fibula of an Allosaurus fragilis specimen catalogued as USNM 4734 are both pathological, both probably due to healed fractures.

The holotype of Neovenator salerii had many pathologies, including pseudoarthrotic gastralia and a deviation to the right of the third and fourth neural spines of the neck vertebrae.

An immature dromaeosaurid specimen (which had not been described in the scientific literature as of 2001) from Tugrugeen Shireh was observed to have a "bifurcated" gastralium.

In the Gorgosaurus libratus holotype (NMC 2120) the 13th and 14th gastralia have healed fractures. Another G. libratus specimen catalogued as TMP94.12.602 bears multiple pathologies, including a pseudoarthortic gastralium.

The unidentified tyrannosaurid specimen TMP97.12.229 had a fractured and healed gastralium.
