= Taxonomy of Allosaurus =

Taxonomy of a dinosaur genus

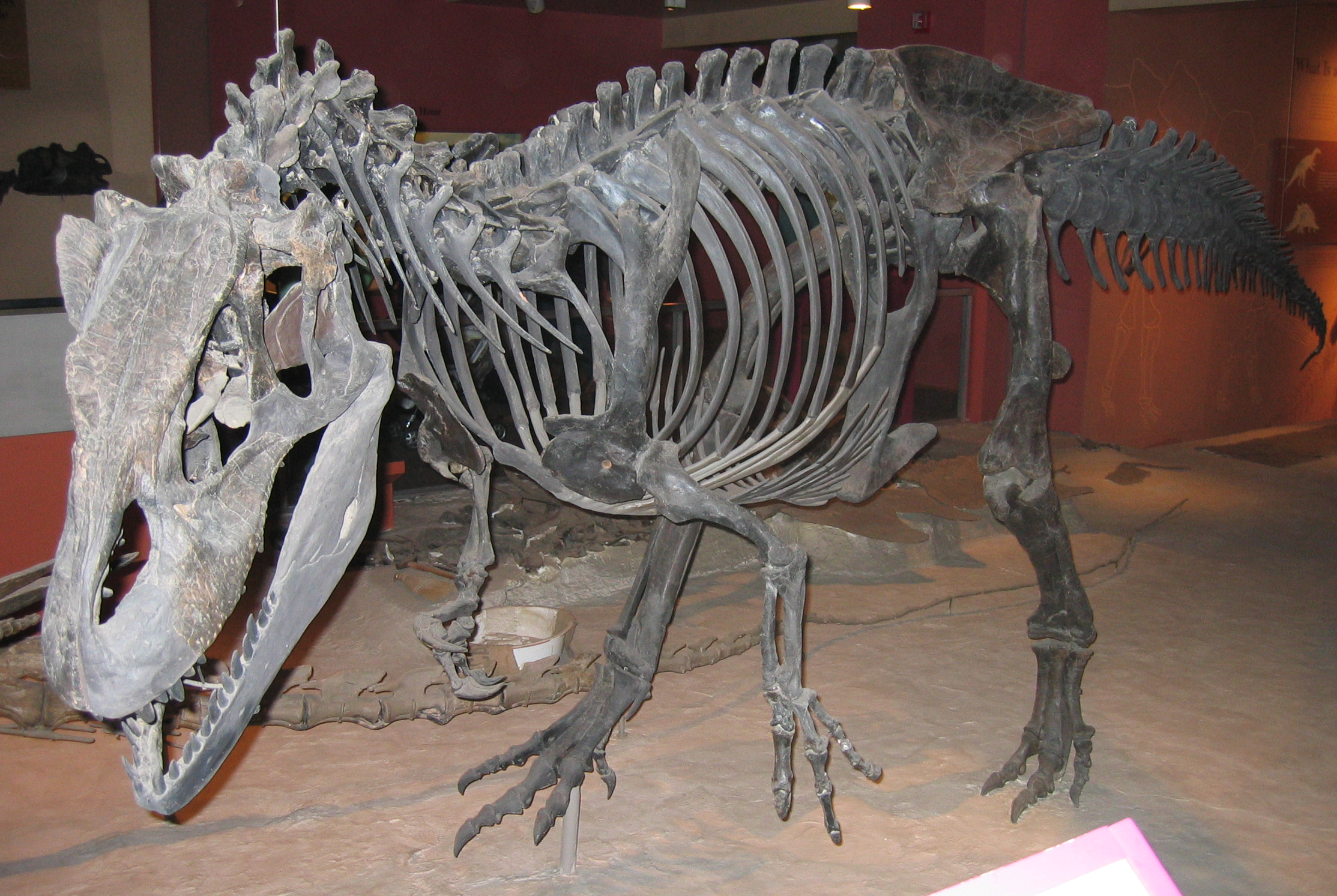
The neotype specimen of Allosaurus fragilis, USNM 4734

The dinosaur genus Allosaurus has a complex taxonomic history, including multiple proposed species of which only a few are considered valid today. The genus was first described in 1877 by Othniel Charles Marsh from a very fragmentary specimen found in Colorado. For several decades, Allosaurus was known under the name Antrodemus, until a 1976 publication re-established the name Allosaurus. In 2023, another, much more complete specimen found in the same quarry was selected as the neotype (the specimen on which the taxon is based, replacing the inadequate original specimen).

Four species are considered potentially valid. Besides the well-known type species A. fragilis, these are A. europaeus, A. jimmadseni, and A. anax. A. europaeus, based on a specimen from Portugal, is the only species found outside of North America. Its validity is contested, and some researchers found it to be a synonym of A. fragilis. A. jimmadseni was described in 2020 and is known from multiple complete specimens. A. anax was described in 2024 based on a few bones that were previously assigned to the genus Saurophaganax. Several other species are no longer accepted, and several other genera, such as Epanterias, Creosaurus, and Labrosaurus, have been considered as synonyms of Allosaurus. Fossils from Tanzania, Siberia, and Australia have been previously assigned but are no longer thought to belong to this genus.

== The genus Allosaurus ==
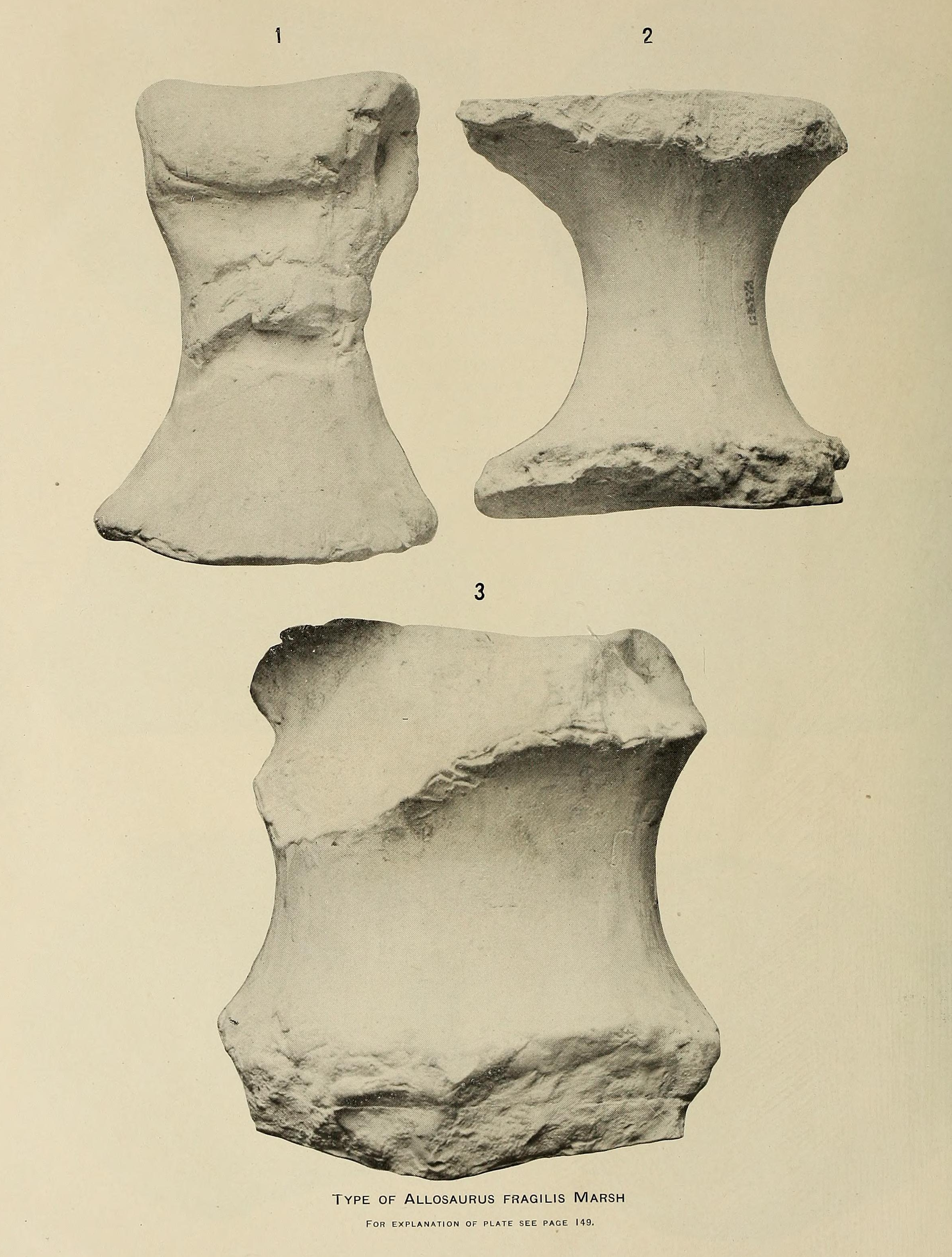
Casts of the holotype of Allosaurus fragilis, YPM 1930, including a foot bone (1) and parts of two vertebrae (2 and 3)

Allosaurus is among the best-known dinosaurs, both scientifically and in public perception. It is the most common theropod in the Morrison Formation, an important fossil deposit in the Western US, accounting for 70 to 75% of theropod specimens. Additional specimens have been discovered in Portugal. Besides the type species, A. fragilis, several additional species have been proposed, three of which are currently in use. Most specimens are not yet assigned to any particular species.

Allosaurus was discovered during the Bone Wars, a feud between the two paleontologists Othniel Charles Marsh and Edward Drinker Cope that led to a surge of fossil discoveries in the Western US. Marsh coined the name Allosaurus fragilis in 1877 for a fragmentary specimen (the holotype specimen; the specimen on which the species was based). According to Marsh, this specimen includes a lumbar vertebra, later identified as a middle dorsal vertebra (back vertebra); a tail vertebra; and "feet bones", later identified as the proximal phalanx (finger bone) of digit III of the right foot. James Henry Madsen, in his 1976 monograph "Allosaurus Fragilis: A Revised Osteology", noted that a tooth and a humerus (upper arm bone) fragment are part of the same specimen. These fossils are part of the collection of the Peabody Museum of Natural History and have the specimen number YPM 1930. The genus name Allosaurus comes from the Greek words allos/αλλος, meaning 'strange' or 'different', and sauros/σαυρος, meaning 'lizard' or 'reptile'. Marsh chose the name 'different lizard' because he believed that the vertebrae were different from those of other dinosaurs due to the deep concavities in their sides, giving them a lightweight construction. More complete specimens have later shown that these concavities were in fact internal chambers that were exposed due to damage of the bone. The bones were collected in 1877 from the Morrison Formation by Marshall Felch in what is now known as Felch Quarry, in the Garden Park area, Colorado.

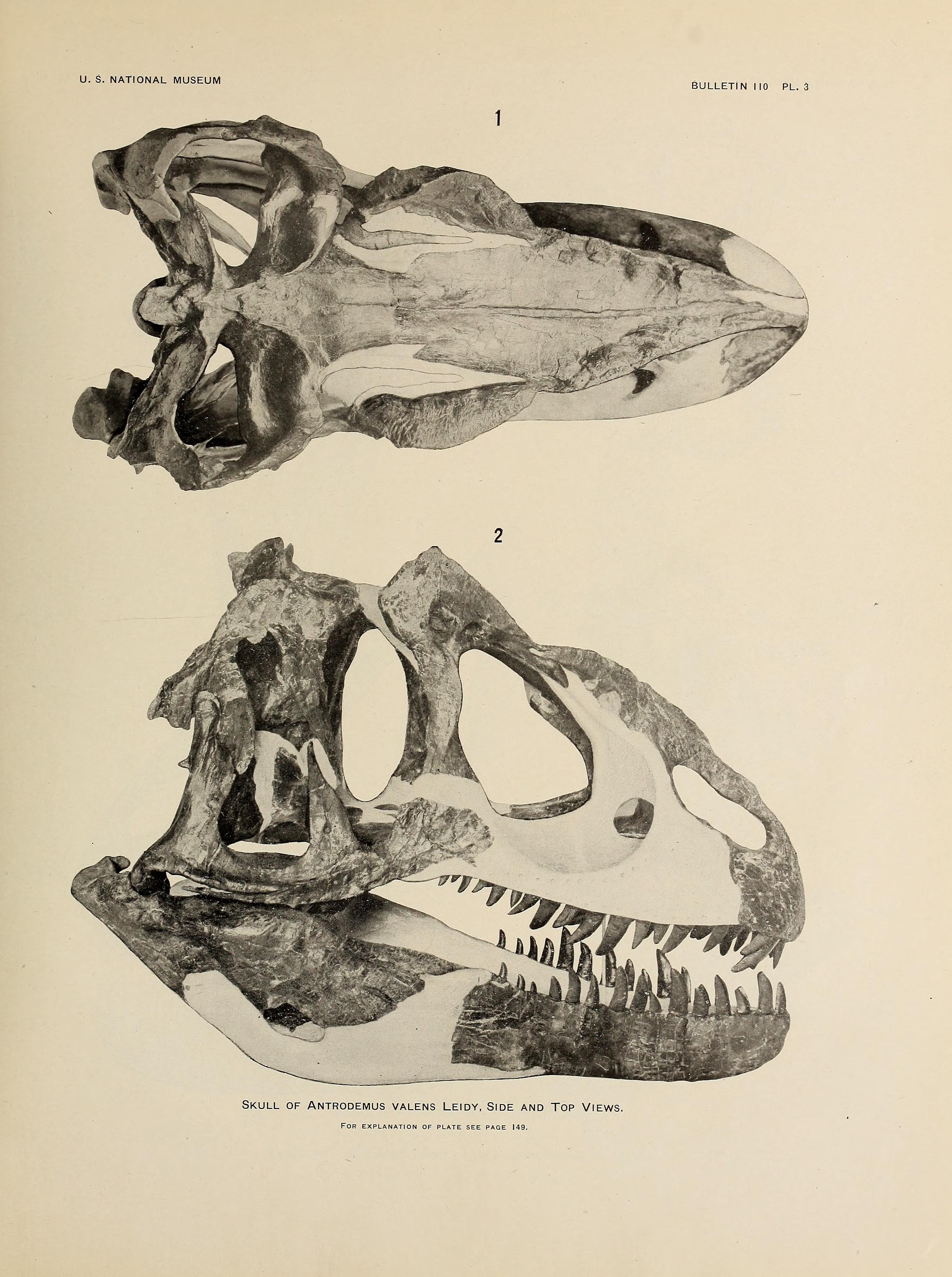
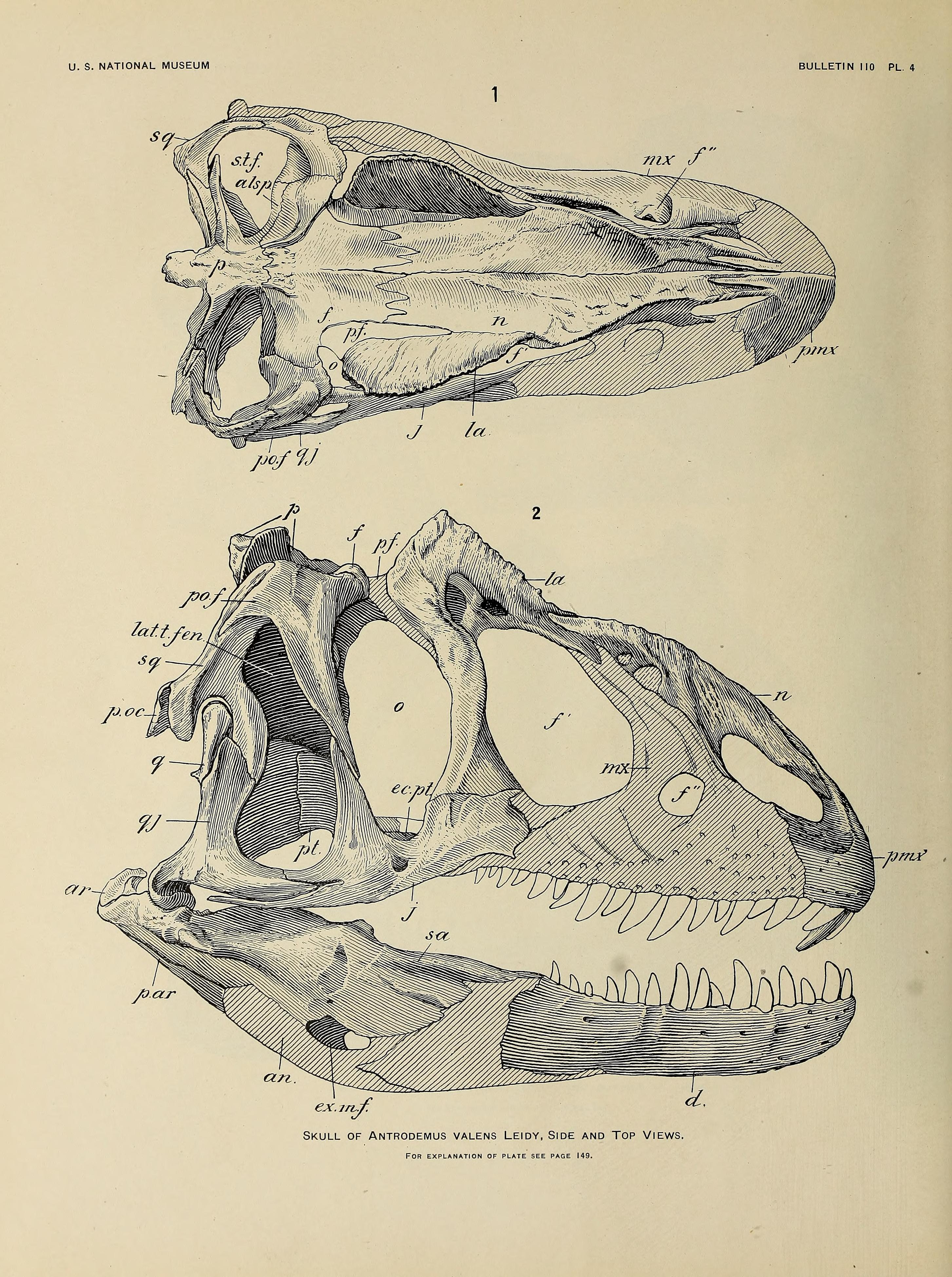
Skull of USNM 4734 as figured in Gilmore's 1920 monograph, where it was labelled Antrodemus valens. The skull was reconstructed too short.

In a 1920 monograph, Charles W. Gilmore published the first comprehensive description of Allosaurus, mostly based on the much more complete specimen USNM 4734. This specimen includes a skeleton with skull that Felch had discovered in the same quarry in which he already found the holotype. However, Gilmore used the name Antrodemus valens instead of Allosaurus fragilis, an older name that was based on a single vertebra of uncertain origin, and which he thought had priority. Antrodemus then became the accepted name for the animal for more than 50 years, until Madsen published his 1976 monograph in which he returned to Marsh's name. Madsen's account was based on immense amounts of material from Cleveland-Lloyd Dinosaur Quarry as well as DINO 2560, a well-preserved skeleton from Dinosaur National Monument.

=== Neotype designation and diagnosis ===
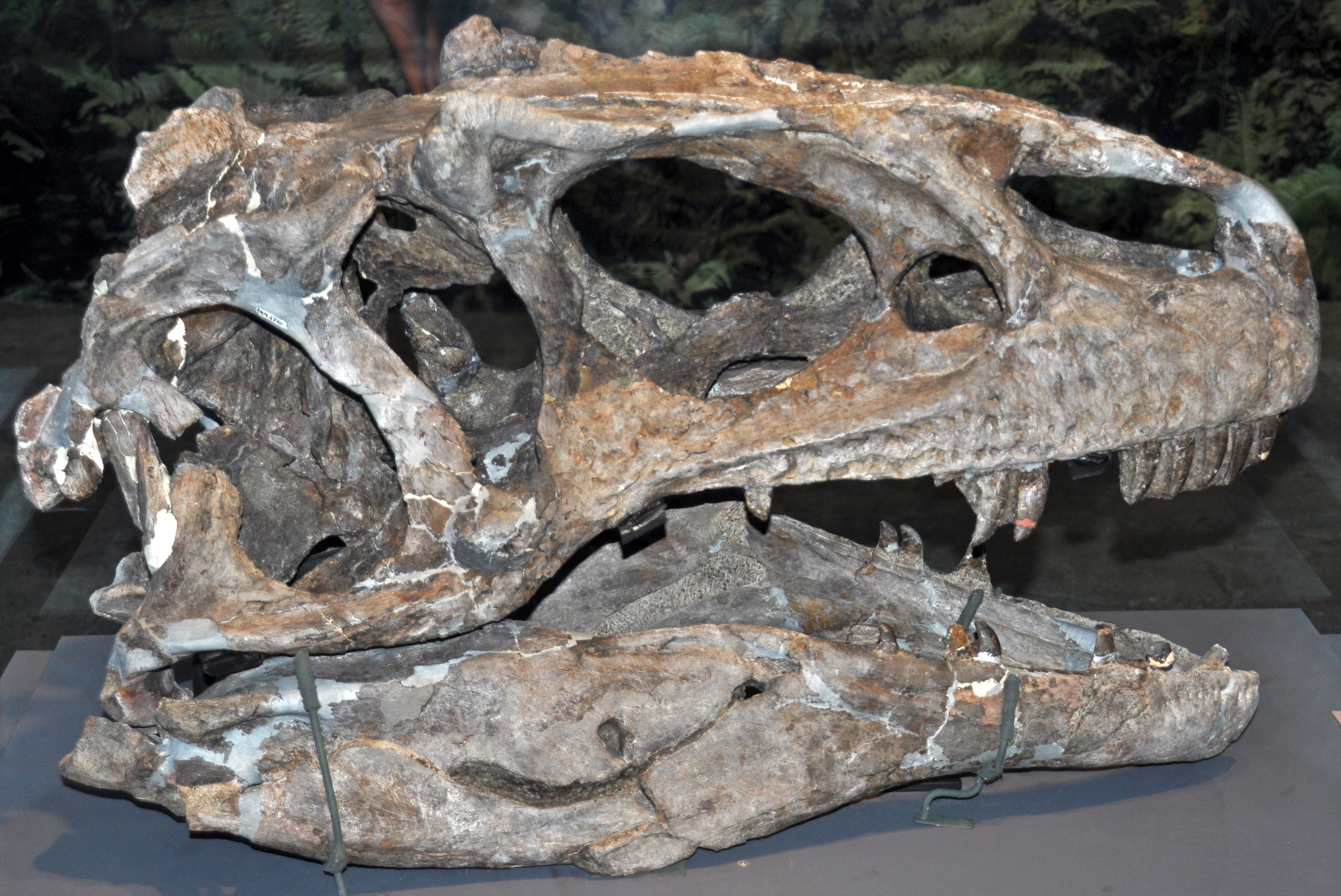
Skull of DINO 2560 at Dinosaur National Monument, which James Madsen suggested as the neotype (specimen that defines the species) of Allosaurus fragilis in 1976. This was not accepted, and the specimen USNM 4734 was instead designated as the neotype.

The holotype specimen of Allosaurus fragilis is too fragmentary to distinguish it from related genera and therefore not diagnostic, and the same is true of the holotype of Antrodemus valens, which consists of a part of a tail vertebra. Therefore, Madsen designated DINO 2560 as the neotype (replacement) specimen in his 1976 monograph, but this was not recognized because such a designation requires a formal ruling by the International Commission on Zoological Nomenclature (ICZN). In 2010, Gregory S. Paul and Kenneth Carpenter argued that the younger age and the proportionally longer skull of this specimen suggest that it might belong to a taxon other than A. fragilis. Paul and Carpenter instead argued that USNM 4734 should become the neotype, and submitted a formal case to the ICZN to have the name A. fragilis officially transferred to this specimen in order to warrant stability of the genus. They argued that USNM 4734 is the ideal replacement specimen because it is from the same quarry as the holotype and therefore probably of the same species. The proposal has subsequently been supported by other comments and was ratified by the ICZN on December 29, 2023.

The exact set of anatomical features used to distinguish Allosaurus from other genera varies between studies. Among the commonly cited features is the large horn that is formed by the lacrimal bone and is situated above and in front of the eye. The lower jaw contains a bone known as the antarticular, which newly evolved in Allosaurus and is not found in other genera. The paroccipital processes (a pair of bony struts that extend backwards and sidewards from the braincase at the back of the skull) are extending ventrally (downwards) beyond the level of the basal tubera (tubercle-like extensions on the underside of the braincase). Another distinguishing feature is found in the pelvis, where the lower end of the ischium is suboval in side view.

=== Inner systematics ===
The relationships between individual Allosaurus specimens can be assessed using specimen-level phylogenetic analysis, in which a software calculates which of all possible cladograms (evolutionary trees) requires the least number of evolutionary steps to explain the differences between specimens. In 2024, Burigo and colleagues analyzed five skulls to conclude that A. europaeus is a separate species most closely related to A. jimmadseni. In 2025, Malafaia and colleagues used 17 skulls and instead concluded that the two A. europaeus skulls are more closely related to some specimens of A. fragilis than to each other, suggesting that A. europaeus is a synonym of A. fragilis.

- Allosaurus
  - A. fragilis
    - ML 415 (holotype of A. europaeus)
    - USNM 8423
    - AMNH 5753
    - AMNH 666
    - YPM VP 14554
    - CM 11844
    - - USNM 4734 (neotype of A. fragilis)
      - - BYU 8901
        - - MNHN/UL.AND.# (assigned to A. europaeus)
          - DINO 2560
  - A. jimmadseni
    - - - - DINO 11541 (holotype of A. jimmadseni)
          - YPM VP 4944
        - - USNM 544100
          - - AMNH 600
            - YPM VP 1890
      - - NMZ 1000005 ("Big Al II")
        - MOR 693 ("Big Al")

=== Outer systematics ===
Allosaurus is the eponymous member several higher-level groups: Allosaurinae, Allosauridae, Allosauria, and Allosauroidea. The subfamily Allosaurinae was first used by Gregory S. Paul in a 1988 popular book and included Allosaurus and Chilantaisaurus, but has not been widely used. Allosauridae is a family that Marsh had named in 1878, one year after his description of A. fragilis. Originally, Allosauridae contained only Allosaurus itself. Although additional genera were later added, recent reviews have restricted the family to Allosaurus and Saurophaganax, with the latter no longer being recognized as a distinct genus. Allosauria is a higher-level group that typically includes Allosauridae and Carcharodontosauria. Allosauroidea is an even more inclusive group that also encompasses Metriacanthosauridae.

== Currently recognized species ==
Allosaurus was a variable genus, one such area of variability being size.

=== Allosaurus fragilis ===
The type species of Allosaurus, A. fragilis, was named by Marsh in 1877, together with the genus Allosaurus. The name fragilis is Latin for 'fragile' and refers to the lightening features in the vertebrae. Because the specimen on which Marsh based the species on (the holotype, YPM 1930) is not diagnostic, the substantially more complete specimen USNM 4734 was designated as the neotype in 2023. USNM 4734 was discovered by Felch in the same quarry in which the holotype was discovered; it is therefore likely that both represent the same species.

Malafaia and colleagues, in their 2025 study, proposed that A. fragilis can be diagnosed by four features found in the skull. There are two rows of nutrient foramina (small openings for blood vessels, nerves, and similar tissues) on the outer surface of the maxilla (upper jaw bone). The jugal (bone of the cheek area) has a bulging on its lower edge, and in the braincase, the fossa (depression) on the basioccipital below the occipital condyle (the bony projection that connects with the vertebral column) has parallel margins and is less than 60% of the width of the occipital condyle. The lacrimal horn is triangular in shape.

=== Allosaurus europaeus ===
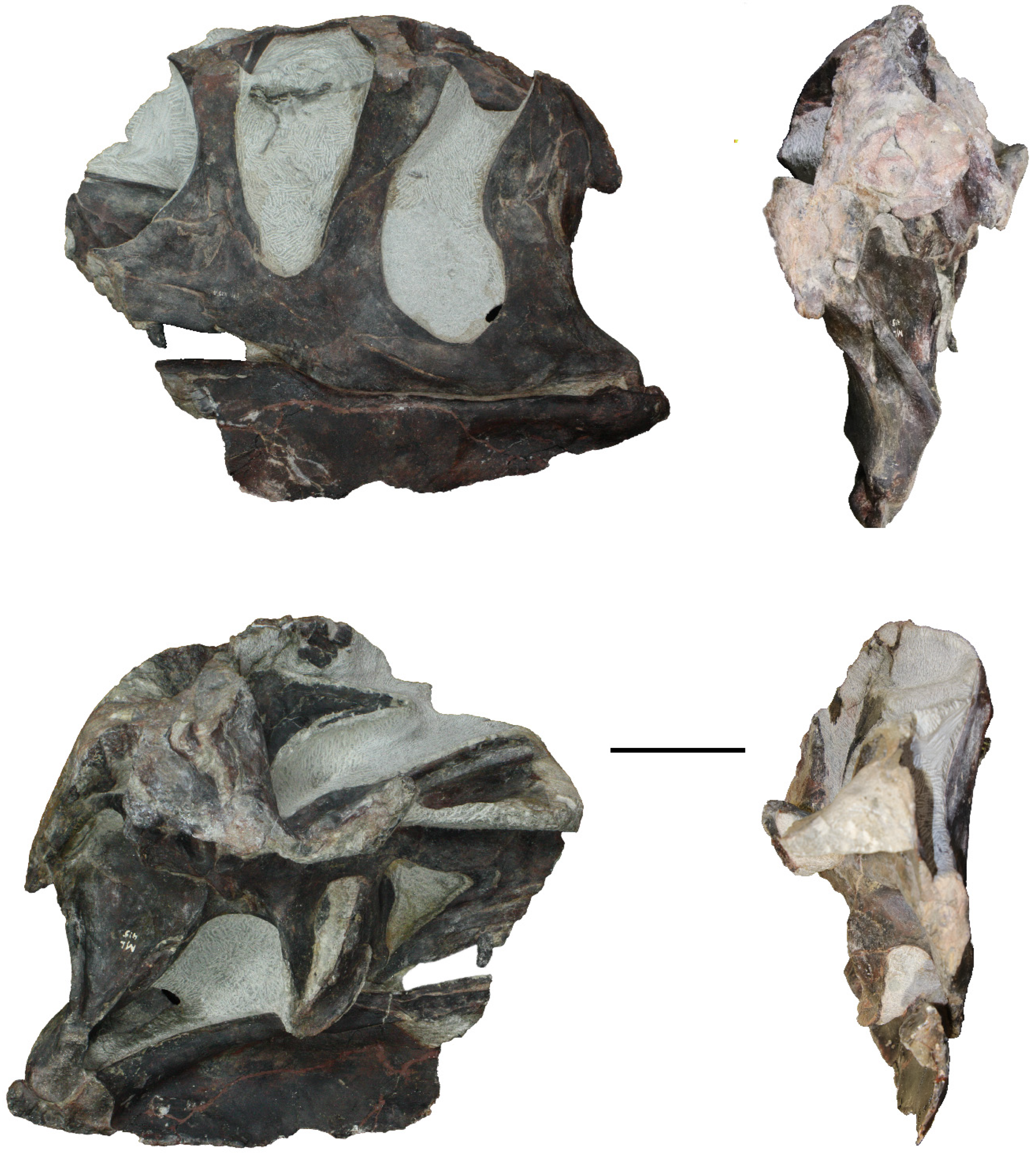
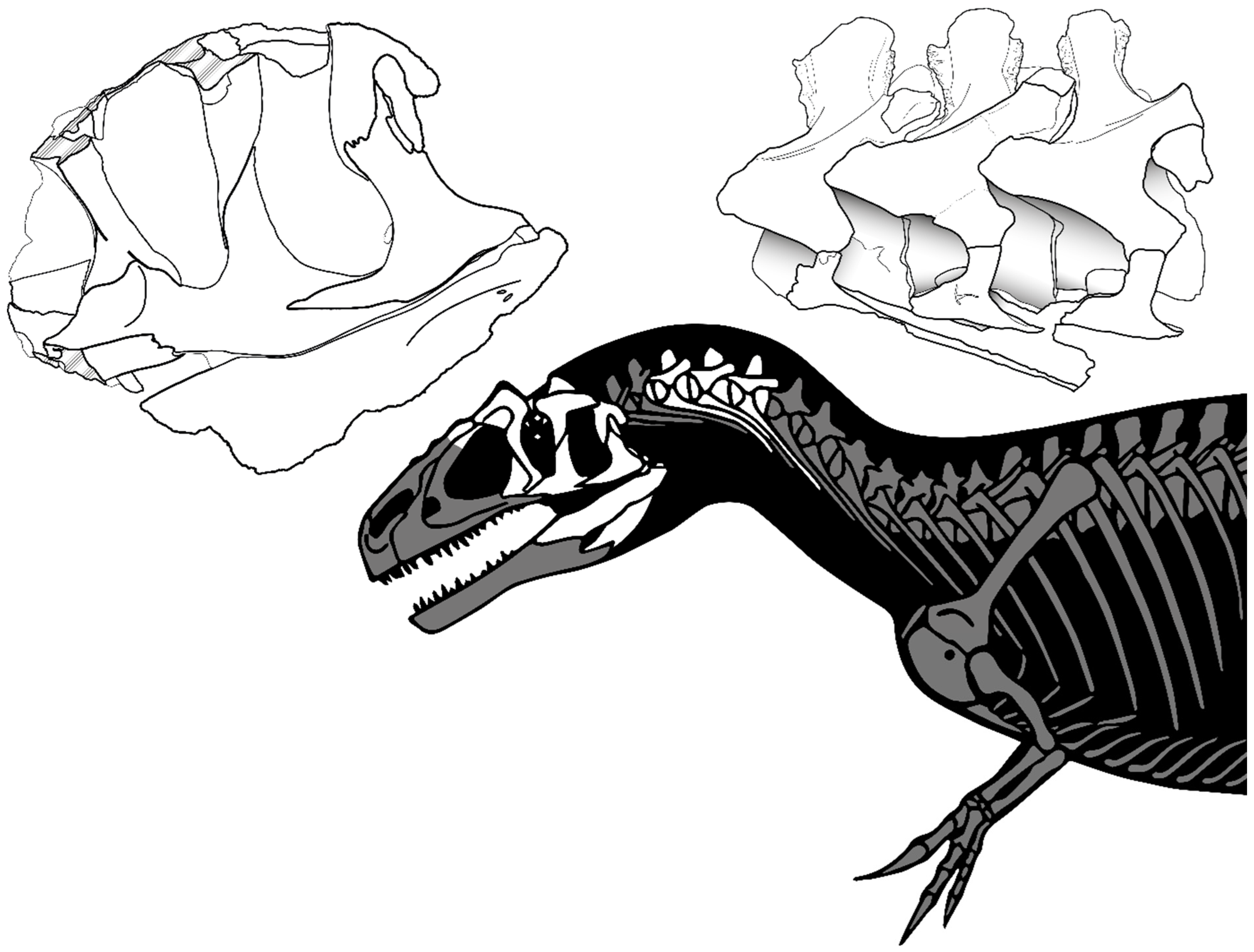
A. europaeus holotype skull with diagram showing preserved elements

A. europaeus was named in 2006 by Octávio Mateus and colleagues based on a partial skull and three neck vertebrae (ML 415) from the Vale Frades beach in Lourinhã, Portugal. These authors also assigned a second specimen to this species, a partial skeleton that includes an articulated hind limb and pelvis (MNHNUL/AND.001), which was found in 1988 near the village of Andrés in the District of Leiria. The specific name europaeus alludes to Europe. Mateus and colleagues defined their new species based on 17 features in the skull, such as a narrow lacrimal horn and a bifurcated rear end of the maxilla. The status of A. europaeus is controversial, and some studies have argued that the species is a synonym of A. fragilis, a nomen dubium (dubious name), or in need of re-evaluation. In a 2025 analysis, Malafaia and colleagues argued that all but one of the diagnostic features of A. europaeus fall within the variation range of A. fragilis.

In 2025, André Burigo and Mateus re-described the Vale Frades specimen and identified nine unique features in the skull and neck vertebrae that support the validity A. europaeus. These authors further proposed that the species differs from A. fragilis in its longer lacrimal horns, a narrow crest on the nasal bone, the sizes of small pneumatic foramina (small openings) in the nasal bone, and the presence of additional laminae (sheets of bone) in the neck vertebrae. These results were questioned by Malafaia and colleagues in 2025, although these authors cautioned that most of the diagnostic features listed by Burigo and Mateus were new and still have to be evaluated in a wider range of Allosaurus specimens.

=== Allosaurus jimmadseni ===
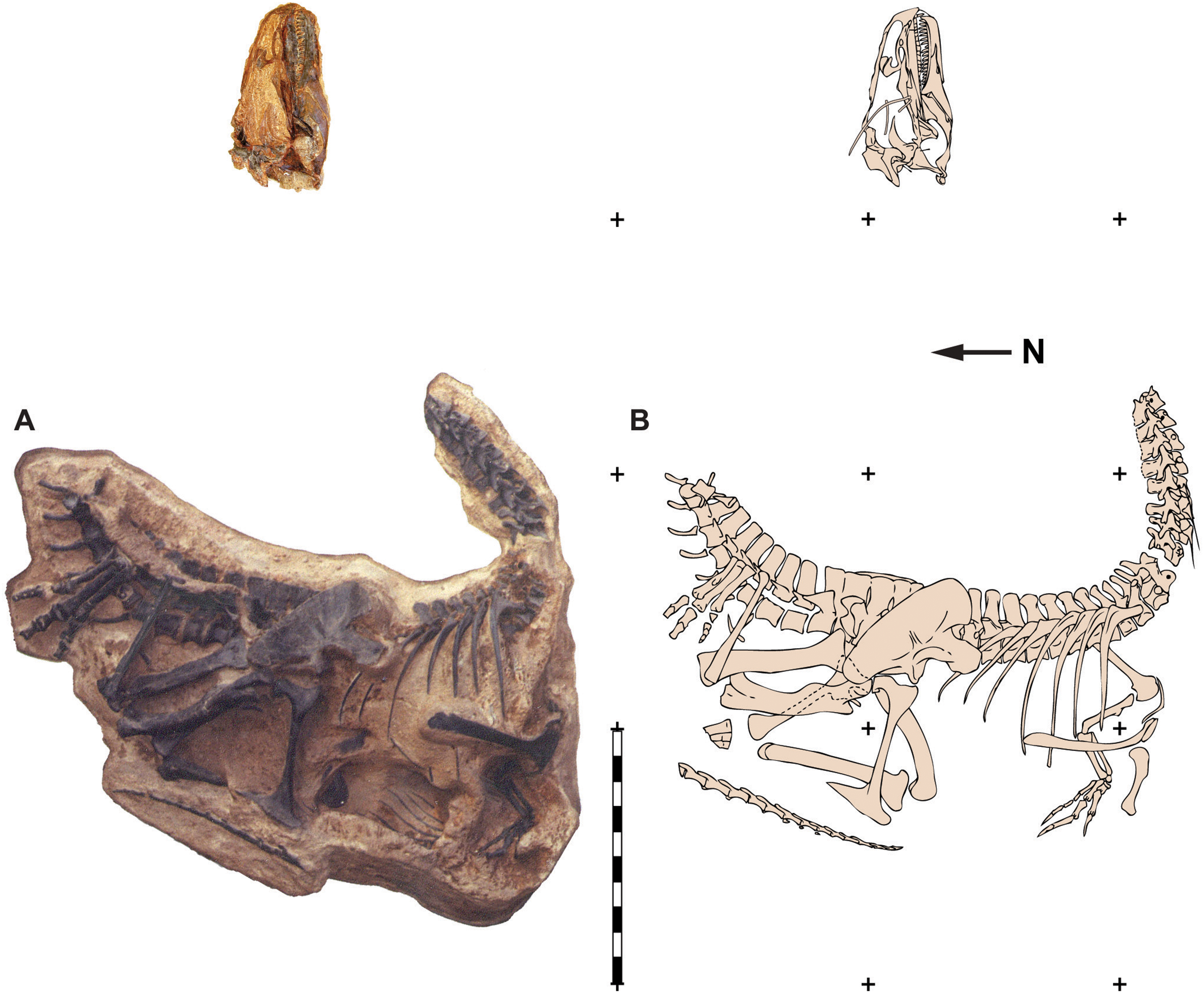
Quarry map of DINO 11541, the holotype specimen of A. jimmadseni

The name A. jimmadseni was first used in 2000, in the unpublished PhD thesis of Daniel Chure, and has since been used informally as a nomen nudum ('naked name', a name that was invalidly published). A. jimmadseni was formally described by Chure and Mark Loewen in 2020. The name honors James Madsen for his work on the Cleveland-Lloyd Dinosaur Quarry and his influential 1976 monograph on the genus. A nearly complete specimen from Dinosaur National Monument, DINO 11541, was chosen as the holotype specimen, while several other specimens were assigned to the species, including MOR 693 ("Big Al") and SMA 0005 ("Big Al II"). Chure and Mark diagnosed the species by a unique combination of seven anatomical details, including a low and narrow crest that runs on either side of the skull on along the nasal bones, lacrimal horns that are higher than those of A. fragilis, and the straight lower margin of the jugal. In 2024, Susannah Maidment found that A. fragilis and A. jimmadseni appear to have been contemporaneous but separated geographically, with A. fragilis concentrated in the south and east of the Morrison basin and A. jimmadseni in the north and west. Borth species occur together only at Dry Mesa quarry.

=== Allosaurus anax ===
A. anax was described by Andy Danison and colleagues in 2024, based on a few bones that were previously included in the taxon Saurophaganax maximus, which had been regarded as an allosaurid separate from Allosaurus. Danison and colleagues found that Saurophaganax is a chimera, comprising the fossils of a diplodocid sauropod as well as Allosaurus fossils. One of these Allosaurus fossils, a postorbital bone (OMNH 1771), became the holotype of A. anax, while six additional specimens consisting of parts of cervical and dorsal vertebrae as well as fibulae (calf bones) were assigned to the species. The name anax is Greek for 'king', and also alludes to the name Saurophaganax. According to Danison and colleagues, the A. anax fossils are significantly larger than those of other Allosaurus species. Unique features of the species include the lack of a pronounced ornamentation of the postorbital and the hourglass-shaped dorsal centra (the vertebral bodies of the back vertebrae) that are penetrated by pneumatic foramina (small openings), among other features.

== Previously assigned species and synonyms ==
=== Poikilopleuron valens (Antrodemus) ===
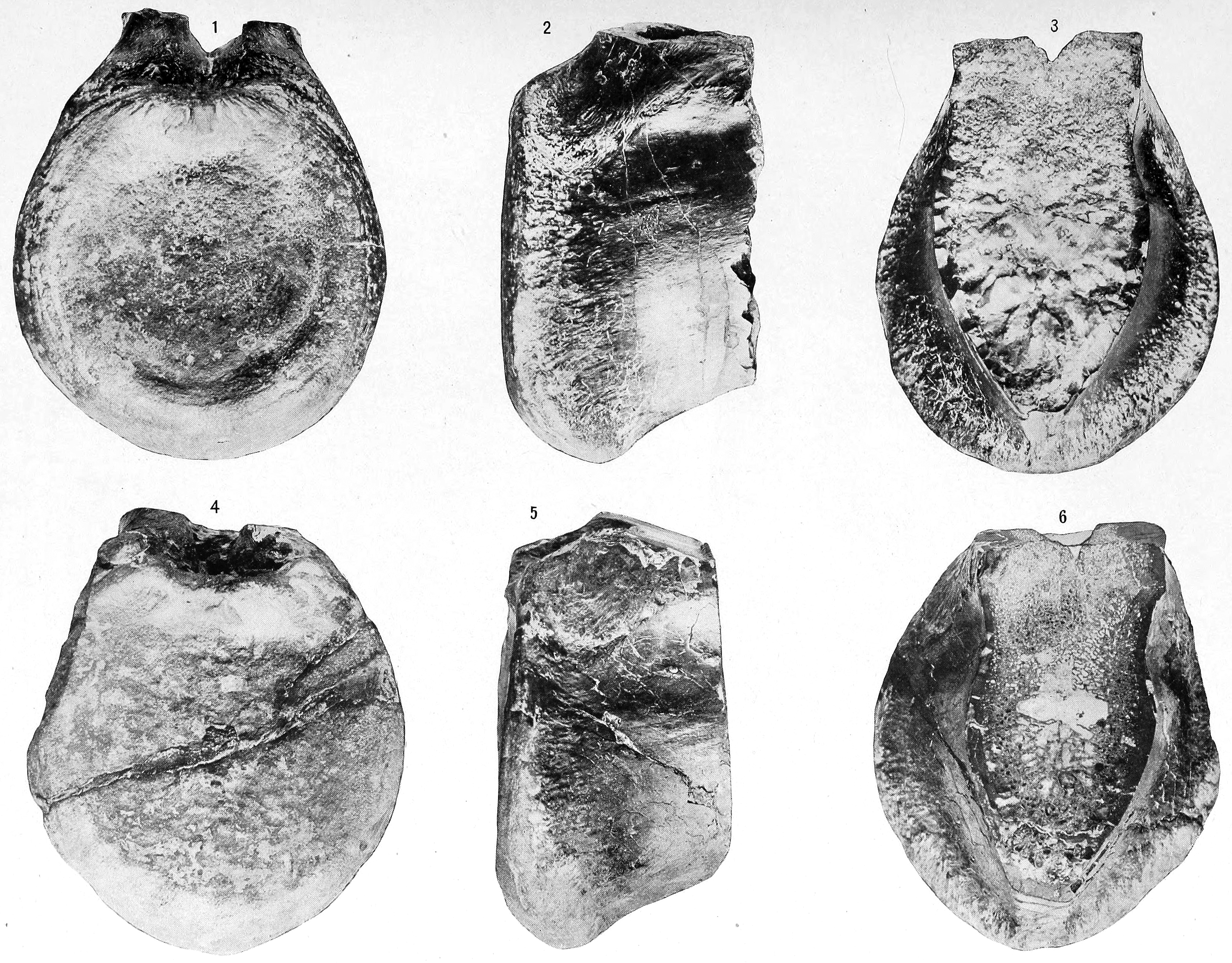
Antrodemus valens holotype tail vertebra (above) compared to those of Allosaurus (below)

In 1869, Ferdinand Vandeveer Hayden obtained a fossil secondhand from Middle Park, near Granby, Colorado, from Morrison Formation rocks. Hayden sent his specimen to Joseph Leidy, who identified it as half of a tail vertebra, and tentatively assigned it to the European theropod genus Poekilopleuron, as the new species Poicilopleuron [sic] valens, based on the shared presence of a large medullary cavity. He noted that if more differences from P. bucklandii were to be found, the new species might be assigned to its own genus, Antrodemus. In 1873, he amended his description and identified the species as Antrodemus valens. In his 1920 monograph, Gilmore concluded that Antrodemus valens was indistinguishable from Allosaurus, and that Antrodemus valens should be the preferred name because, as the older name, it had priority. However, Gilmore was not fully confident about his choice as the Antrodemus specimen is not diagnostic. Antrodemus became the accepted name over Allosaurus for over 50 years, until Madsen, in his 1976 monograph, concluded that Allosaurus should be used because Antrodemus was based on material with poor, if any, diagnostic features and locality information. Madsen pointed out that Gilmore studied the Allosaurus holotype based on plaster casts sent to him by Richard Swann Lull, and might not have been aware of the existence of the humerus fragment, which is the most diagnostic of the Allosaurus holotype bones. Antrodemus has since been treated as a nomen dubium. The specimen is catalogued as USNM 218. Allosaurus valens is a new combination for Antrodemus valens used by Friedrich von Huene in 1932.

=== Laelaps trihedrodon ===
Laelaps trihedrodon was named by Cope in 1877 based on a right jaw with teeth that was discovered by a local, the school teacher Oramel W. Lucas, in Garden Park. Cope assigned the species to Laelaps (now Dryptosaurus), a genus that he had established in 1866. Subsequently, Cope assigned some additional bones from the same locality to the species, which he also received from Lucas. As with many of Cope's species, the original description of L. trihedrodon is terse, and Cope never provided figures of any of the L. trihedrodon fossils. When Cope's collection was transferred to the American Museum of Natural History in 1903, the jaw, which is the holotype of the species, could not be located and is considered lost. Of the other specimens that Cope assigned to the species, only five incomplete tooth crowns (AMNH 5780) appear to survive. In a 1939 catalog, Oskar Kuhn listed the species as Antrodemus (?) trihedrodon, while listing Allosaurus as a synonym of Antrodemus. In 2001, Chure argued that AMNH 5780 probably belongs to Allosaurus.

=== Labrosaurus ===
The genus Labrosaurus was named by Marsh in 1879, for a species he had described the year before as Allosaurus lucaris. The name Labrosaurus ('greedy lizard') is derived from the Greek labros 'greedy' or 'furious' and sauros 'lizard'. The taxonomic history of the genus is complex and includes several named species. In 1882, Marsh classified the genus as the only member of a new family, Labrosauridae; today, this family is considered to be a synonym of Allosauridae. Labrosaurus is now generally thought to be a synonym of Allosaurus. Several additional species have been assigned to Labrosaurus. L. ferox may be a synonym of Allosaurus fragilis or an indeterminate nomen dubium. Other assigned species included L. sulcatus, L. stechowi, and L. meriani, which may belong to Ceratosaurus or a related form.

==== Allosaurus lucaris ====
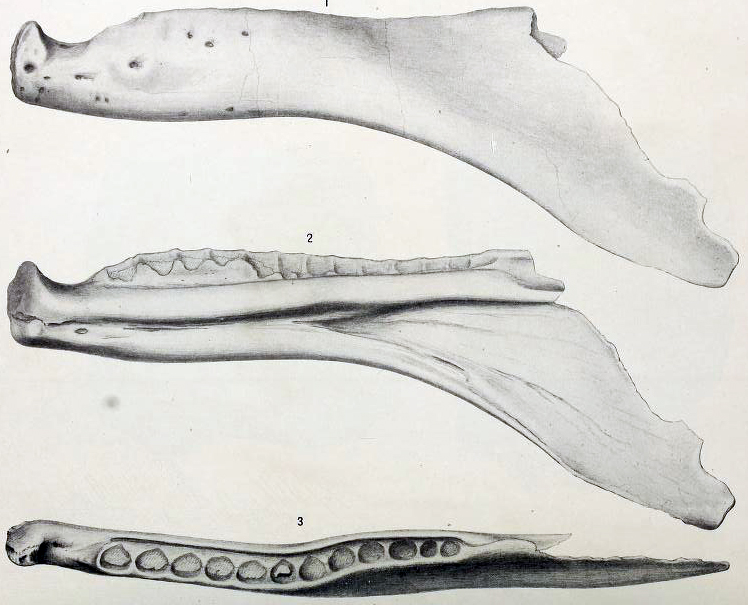
The holotype dentary of Labrosaurus ferox, which may have been injured by the bite of another theropod

The name Allosaurus lucaris was given by Marsh to a fragmentary skeleton in 1878. This specimen (YPM 1931) stems from the Morrison Formation of Colorado or southern Wyoming. Originally, Marsh only mentioned one anterior dorsal vertebra. In 1879, he described additional material of the specimen including vertebrae and bones of the forelimb, and decided it warranted its own genus, Labrosaurus, as L. lucaris. Marsh never published figures of these fossils. More recently, A. lucaris has often been regarded as a synonym of A. fragilis. Paul and Carpenter argued in 2010 that the species is from a younger age than Allosaurus and might therefore represent a different genus. However, they found that the specimen was not diagnostic, and that A. lucaris is a nomen dubium.

==== Labrosaurus ferox ====
Labrosaurus ferox was named in 1884 by Marsh as a second species of Labrosaurus. It is based on a lower jaw (USNM 2315) discovered in Felch Quarry, the same quarry in which the Allosaurus holotype specimen was found. This jaw is oddly formed with a prominent gap in the tooth row at the tip of the jaw, and a rear section that is greatly expanded and down-turned. Gilmore suggested in his 1920 monograph that the bone was pathological, showing an injury to the living animal. In 2000, Madsen also suggested that the bone was pathological, and that the unusually expanded shape was partly due to inaccurate plaster reconstruction. It may be a specimen of A. fragilis, or an indeterminate specimen that may or may not belong to Allosaurus.

=== Epanterias amplexus ===
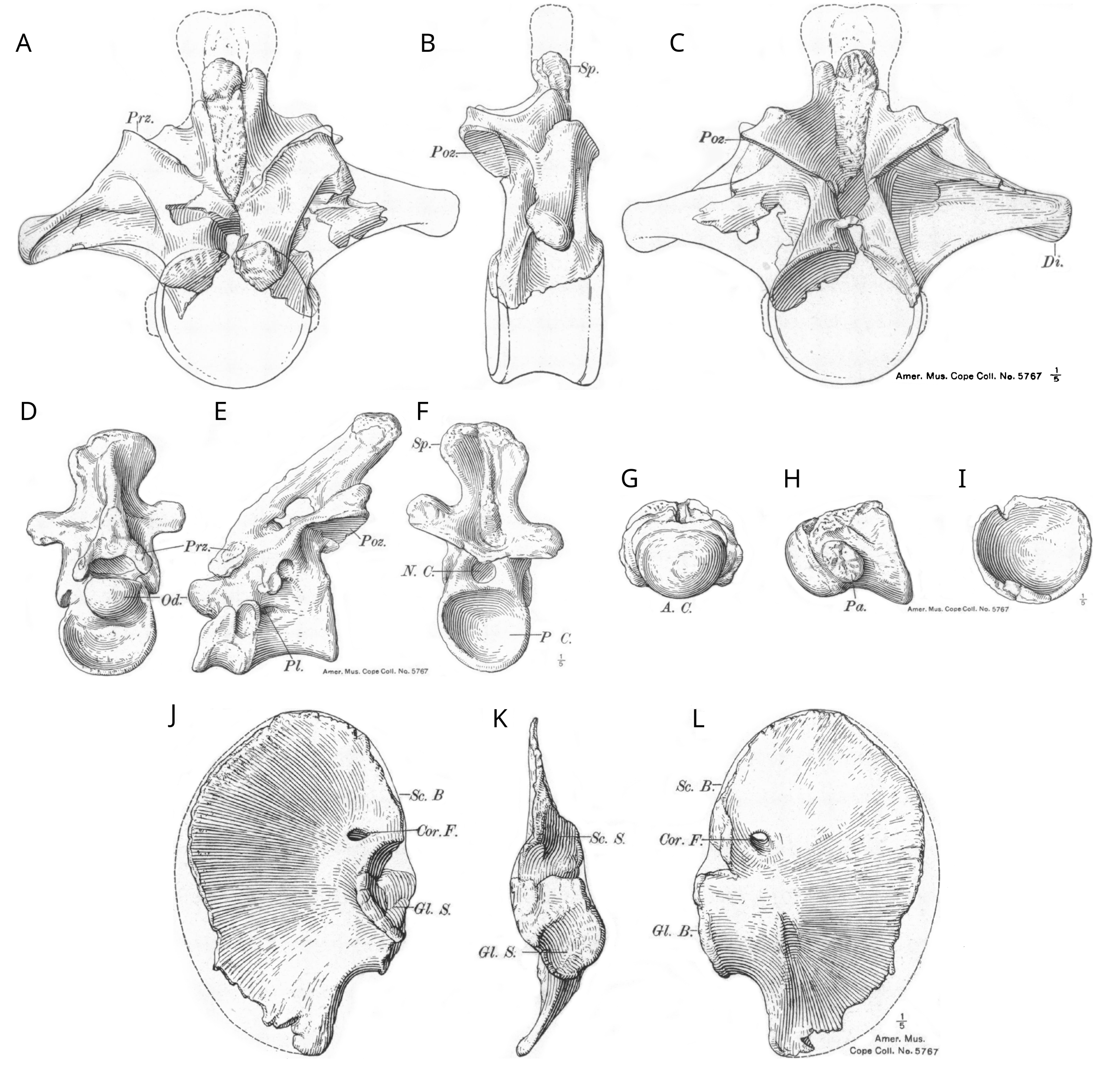
The type dorsal vertebra of Epanterias amplexus (A–C) and associated cervical vertebrae (D–I) and coracoid (J–L)

Epanterias amplexus was named by Cope in 1878 based on a specimen from Quarry 2 in Garden Park, the same region in which Felch Quarry, the type locality of Allosaurus, is located. The name Epanterias translates to 'buttressed (vertebrae)' and is derived from the Greek epi 'upon, on' and anteris 'buttress', while the suffix ias means 'characterized by'. The name amplexus is Latin for 'embracing'. The genus is based on AMNH 5767, which includes two anterior dorsal vertebrae, one of which preserves a mostly complete neural arch; the fourth or fifth neck vertebra; an axis (the second neck vertebra); a coracoid (a bone of the shoulder girdle); and a possible metatarsal (foot bone).

Cope thought that Epanterias was related to Camarasaurus and Streptospondylus, and assigned it to the Camarasauridae, a group that was later assigned to Sauropoda. Subsequently, Epanterias appeared in lists of North American sauropods. In 1921, Henry Fairfield Osborn and Charles Craig Mook instead found Epanterias to be a large theropod, the largest known from the Morrison Formation at that time. These authors were the first to publish figures the fossils. Robert T. Bakker considered Epanterias as a distinct genus of large allosaurid, which inspired Paul, who classified it as a species of Allosaurus, Allosaurus amplexus. Paul, in 1988, and Bakker, in 1990, suggested that large fossils from Oklahoma that would later become known as Saurophaganax maximus may be assigned to the same species. In 1990, Bakker mentioned a third Epanterias amplexus locality, near Masonville, Colorado. Other authors have considered E. amplexus as a synonym of Allosaurus fragilis or equated it with Allosaurus. In 2010, Paul and Carpenter noted that the E. amplexus specimen comes from higher in the Morrison Formation than the type specimen of Allosaurus fragilis, and is therefore "probably a different taxon". They also stated that its holotype specimen is not diagnostic, and listed the taxon as a nomen dubium.

=== Creosaurus atrox ===
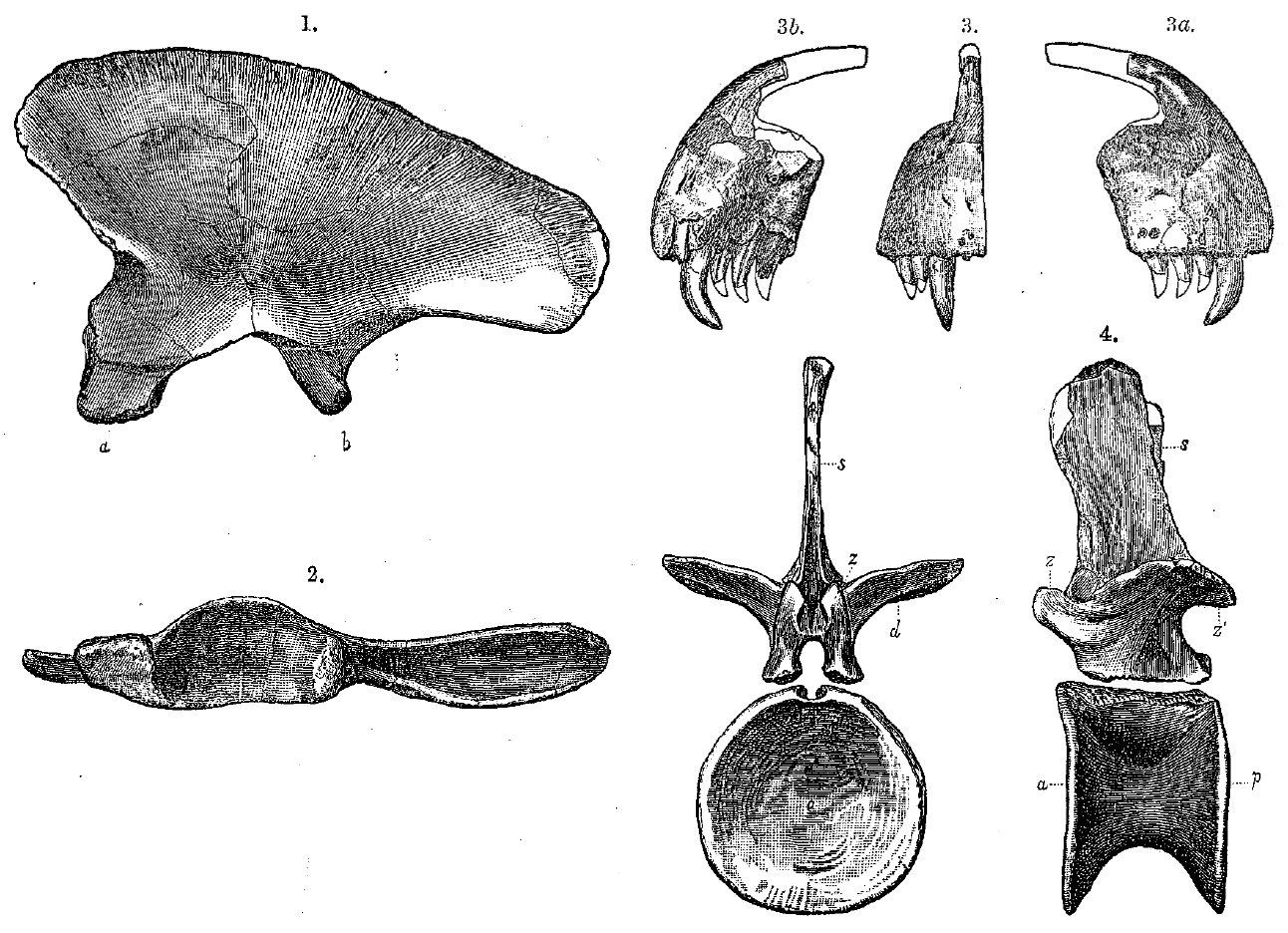
Holotype material of Creosaurus atrox, more recently known as Allosaurus atrox

Creosaurus atrox was described by Marsh in 1878, in the same paper that introduced A. lucaris. The name Creosaurus ('flesh lizard') derives from the Greek κρέας (kréas, 'flesh') and σαῦρος (saûros, 'lizard') and hints at the carnivorous diet of the animal. It is based on YPM 1890, which was collected by Samuel Wendell Williston at Como, Wyoming, and includes two skull bones (a jugal and a premaxilla with teeth), two sacrals (hip vertebrae), and parts of the pelvis and hind limb, including an illium. Marsh found these fossils to be "in excellent preservation". He speculated that the animal preyed upon the Atlantosauridae (sauropods), and estimated its body length at about 20 ft (6.1 m). Marsh found Creosaurus to be closely related to Dryptosaurus, and in 1884 classified these and several other genera including Allosaurus within the Megalosauridae.

In 1901, Williston argued that Marsh has never been able to adequately distinguish Creosaurus from Allosaurus, and that Marsh labelled the drawing of a dorsal vertebra as C. atrox in a 1884 paper even though he had labelled the same drawing as A. fragilis in a 1879 paper. Osborn, in 1903, assigned two fragmentary skulls to Creosaurus, but re-assigend them to Allosaurus in 1912. Oliver Perry Hay, in 1908, also questioned the validity of Creosaurus, as the ilium, which he assumed to be the only bone belonging to the holotype, is indistinguishable from that of Allosaurus. In his 1920 monograph, Gilmore considered C. atrox as a synonym of Antrodemus (=Allosaurus).

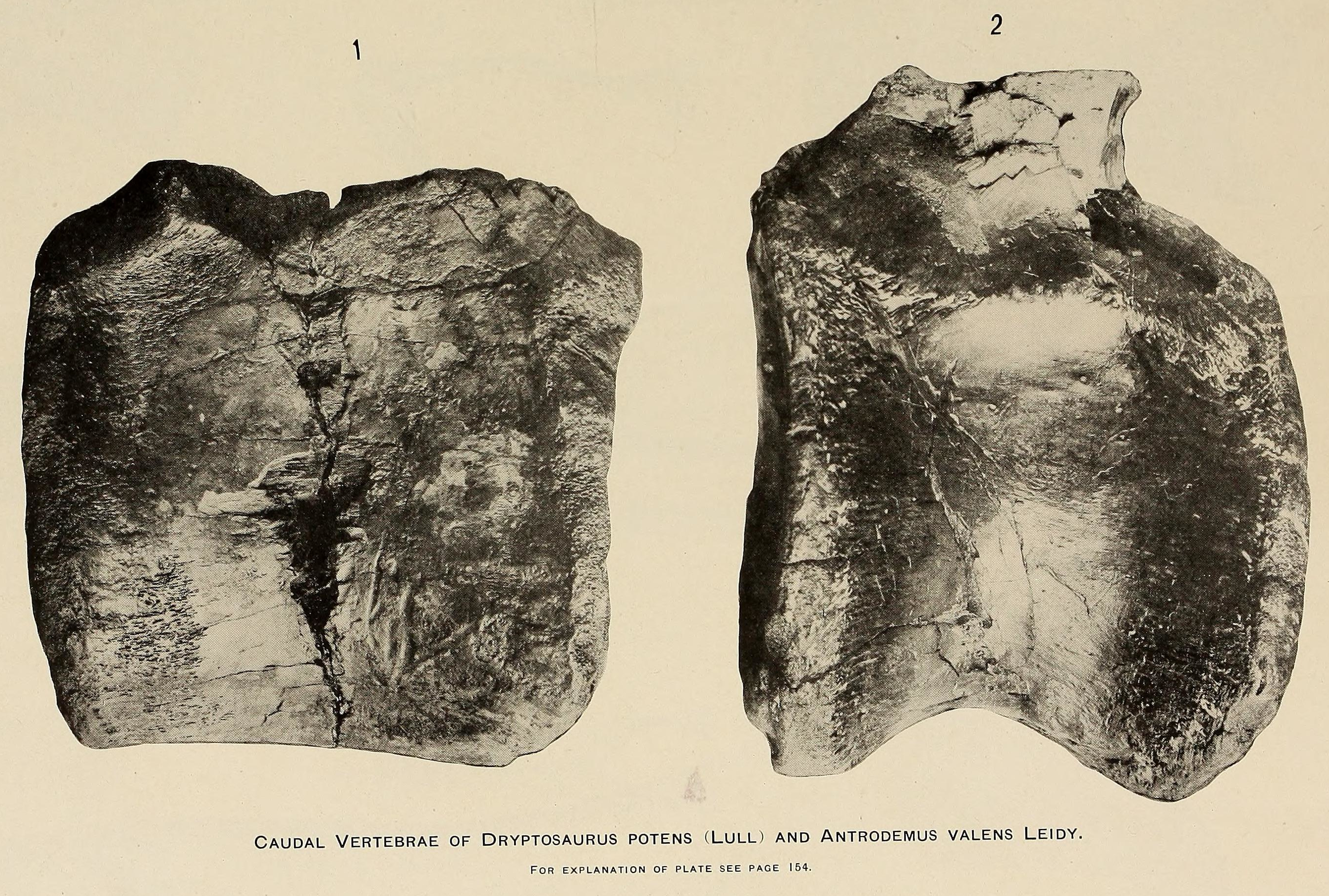
Holotype vertebra of Creosaurus potens (left) compared to an equivalent vertebra of the Allosaurus specimen USNM 8367 (labelled as Antrodemus valens)

In 1911, Richard Swann Lull named a second species, Creosaurus potens, based on a single vertebra (USNM 3049) that J. K. Murphy discovered in the Arundel Formation of Maryland. The word potens is Latin for 'powerful'. Lull identified the vertebrae as a dorsal vertebra, although Gilmore, in his 1920 monograph, showed that it was from the front portion of the tail. Lull stated that C. potens was much larger than Allosaurus medius, which he recognized as a second species of large theropod from the Arundel Formation. In 1921, Gilmore provisionally assigned C. potens to the genus Dryptosaurus, as Dryptosaurus? potens on the basis of the similarities of the vertebral centrum to the caudal vertebrae of Dryptosaurus.

In his 1988 popular book, Paul assigned C. atrox to Allosaurus, as Allosaurus atrox. He suggested that A. fragilis had tall pointed horns and a slender build compared to A. atrox, and that these differences were probably not due to sexual dimorphism because A. atrox is much rarer. The idea of two common Morrison allosaur species was followed in some semi-technical and popular works. However, Chure noted that Gilmore mistakenly reconstructed USNM 4734 as having a shorter skull than the specimens referred by Paul to atrox, refuting supposed differences between USNM 4734 and putative A. atrox specimens like DINO 2560. Bakker, in a 1998 paper, referred to a "creosaur-type allosaurid" that is distinct from A. fragilis, although this informal taxon did not include the Creosaurus holotype. Matthew Carrano and colleagues, in a 2012 review, suggested that Bakker's taxon is mostly equivalent to the subsequently named species A. jimmadseni. In 2010, Paul and Carpenter considered C. atrox to be a nomen dubium.

=== Camptonotus amplus ===
In 1879, Marsh named a new genus of ornithischian dinosaur, Camptonotus (now Camptosaurus), from the Morrison Formation of Como Bluff. Marsh's Camptonotus originally included two species: the type species C. dispar, based on fragmentary skeletons from Quarry 13, as well as C. amplus, based on a right foot (YPM VP.1879) from Quarry 1A ("Big Canyon Quarry"). Marsh initially stated that the C. amplus individual was three times as large as C. dispar, but later declared that it was merely 50% larger, 30 ft (9.1 m) compared to 20 ft (6.1 m). The C. amplus specimen included a foot claw that was deep and flattened side-to-side, rather than rounded as in C. dispar.

The species, under the name Camptosaurus amplus, was accepted as valid in several studies in the late 1990s and early 2000s. In the late 1990s, Bakker first suggested that the foot instead belonged to an allosaurid. In 2015, Galton comprehensively reviewed the species, confirming that the foot is probably that of an allosaurid. He also found that a fragmentary skull (YPM VP.1892) from the same quarry probably belonged to the same individual, while the flattened claw instead belonged to a juvenile sauropod dinosaur. He tentatively assigned the species to Allosaurus, as ?Allosaurus amplus. Subsequent authors noted that Galton did not suggest any difference between A. amplus and A. fragilis, and that the former therefore cannot be assigned to any particular species of Allosaurus. Burigo and colleagues, in their 2025 study, considered the species a nomen dubium.

=== Allosaurus medius ===
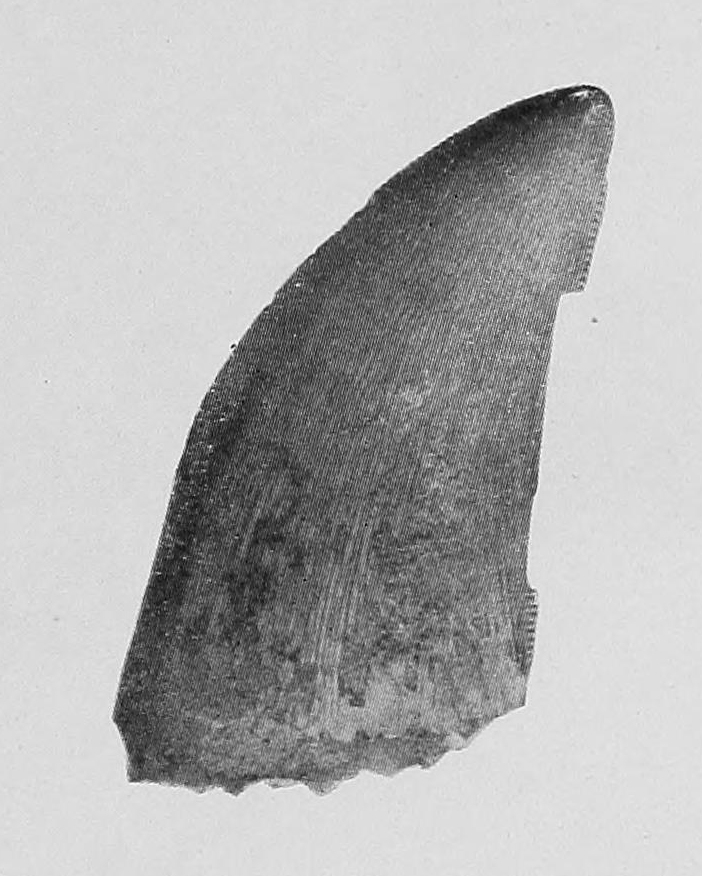
Holotype tooth of A. medius

A. medius was named by Marsh in 1888 for various fossils from the Early Cretaceous Arundel Formation of Maryland. These include teeth, limb, and foot bones, and, according to Marsh, indicate an animal 10 to 12 ft (3.0 to 3.7 m) in length. In 1911, Lull moved most of the remains to the new ornithopod species Dryosaurus grandis, except for a tooth which he considered to be the holotype of A. medius. He assigned several other fossils from the Arundel to A. medius, including teeth, vertebrae, and phalanges. Lull therefore recognized two species of large theropod from the Arundel, A. medius and Creosaurus potens, the latter of which he named in the same publication. Gilmore, in his 1920 monograph, considered the holotype tooth to be not diagnostic but provisionally transferred it to Dryptosaurus based on its geographical context, noting that this assignment "is seriously in doubt". He also expressed doubt that two large theropods were present in the formation, albeit retaining both names. Gilmore in 1921 also moved the other parts of the original A. medius material, which Lull had assigned to Dryosaurus, to a new species of Ornithomimus, which he named Ornithomimus affinis. A. medius has been listed under several genera by different authors, creating the combinations Antrodemus medius, Dryptosaurus medius, and Labrosaurus medius. The 2004 edition of the encyclopedia The Dinosauria listed A. medius as a dubious species of theropod.

=== Allosaurus sibiricus ===
Allosaurus sibiricus was described in 1914 by Anatoly Riabinin on the basis of a bone, later identified as a partial fourth metatarsal, from the Early Cretaceous of Buryatia, Russia. In 1990, Ralph Molnar and colleagues transferred it to Chilantaisaurus, as Chilantaisaurus? sibiricus, based on its age and locality. It is now considered a nomen dubium, indeterminate beyond Theropoda.

=== Allosaurus tendagurensis ===
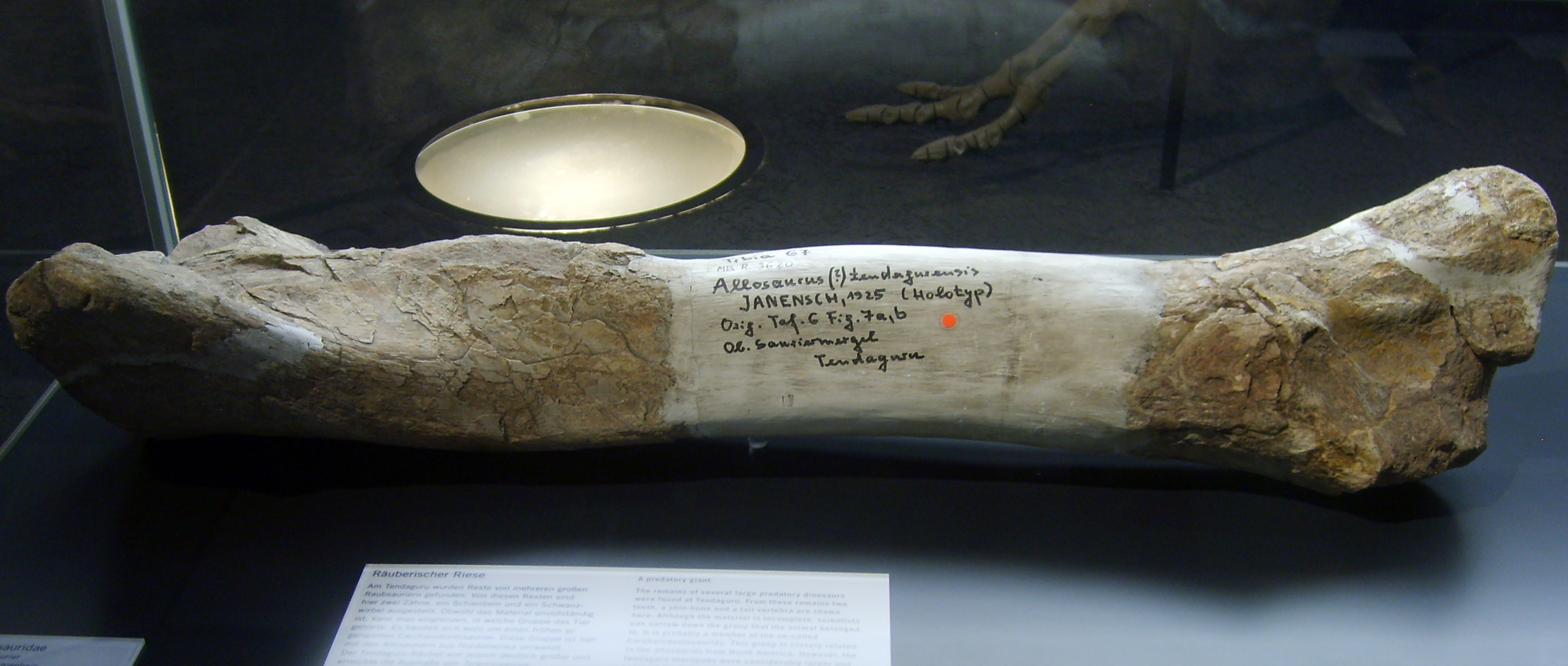
A. tendagurensis tibia, Naturkunde Museum Berlin

A. tendagurensis was named in 1925 by Werner Janensch for a tibia (MB.R.3620) found in the Kimmeridgian-Tithonian Tendaguru Formation in Mtwara, Tanzania. Missing portions of the bone had been restored, which possibly made the bone more elongate than it originally was. Janensch also assigned tail vertebrae to this species, which was not accepted by later studies. Although tabulated as a tentatively valid species of Allosaurus in the second edition of The Dinosauria, subsequent studies placed it as indeterminate beyond Tetanurae, either a carcharodontosaurian or megalosaurid. Carrano and colleagues, in 2012, noted that the tibia is not very similar to that of Allosaurus.

=== Saurophaganax maximus ===
The fossils that would later become known as Saurophaganax were discovered by John Willis Stovall in 1931–1931 in the Morrison Formation of Oklahoma. In a popular magazine, Stovall named these fossils Saurophagus maximus. In 1953, Charles Lewis Camp and colleagues pointed out that the name Saurophagus had already been given to a modern bird, the great kiskadee, and that Stovall's description was too terse to comply with the nomenclatural rules of the ICZN. Consequently, Saurophagus maximus was considered a nomen nudum. In 1995, Chure properly described the taxon and renamed it Saurophaganax.

David K. Smith, in a 1998 analysis of variation within Allosaurus, concluded that S. maximus was not different enough from Allosaurus to be a separate genus, but did warrant its own species, A. maximus. This reassignment was rejected in the 2004 edition of The Dinosauria. A 2024 reassessment by Andy Danison and colleagues suggested that the holotype neural arch of Saurophaganax, along with some other material might have been from a sauropod. Other Saurophaganax bones were assigned to diplodocid sauropods. The remaining bones were confirmed as those of a theropod, and assigned to a new species of Allosaurus, A. anax.

=== Allosaurus lucasi ===
Allosaurus lucasi was named in 2014 by Sebastian Dalman for two specimens from the top of the Morrison Formation (Tithonian) in Colorado. The name lucasi honors Spencer G. Lucas for his contributions to vertebrate paleontology. The specimens were excavated in 1953 by a field crew of the Yale Peabody Museum led by Joseph T. Gregory at McElmo Canyon in what is now Canyons of the Ancients National Monument, Colorado. The holotype specimen (YPM VP 57589) is a fragmentary skeleton of an adult individual that includes disarticulated bones of the skull and postcranium, including an almost complete left foot. The second specimen (YPM VP 57726) consists of two skull bones (dentary and splenial) of a juvenile individual. According to Dalman, A. lucasi differs from A. fragilis in several features, such as its shorter premaxilla and the shorter branches of the quadratojugal that contacted the jugal and the quadrate. Dalman suggested that A. lucasi was comparatively large, and possibly the geologically youngest known species of Allosaurus. Later authors did not accept this proposed species. Chure and Loewen declared the species as "invalid" in 2020, while Burigo and colleagues considered it a nomen dubium in 2025.

== Typographical errors and nomina nuda ==
"Allosaurus agilis", seen in Osborn, 1912, is a typographical error for A. fragilis. "Allosaurus ferox" is a typographical error by Marsh for A. fragilis made in a footnote in 1896. Likewise, "Labrosaurus fragilis" is a typographical error by Marsh (1896) for Labrosaurus ferox. "Labrosaurus huene" is a nomen nudum used by von Huene in 1956 and 1958 for a tooth from the Upper Jurassic of Sichuan, China. "Allosaurus whitei" was coined by Pickering in 1995, and has been listed as a synonym of A. fragilis.

== Other misassigned specimens ==
Several fragmentary specimens from Europe and Asia have been assigned to Allosaurus, but Burigo and colleagues, in a 2025 review, found that only the Portuguese material as well as some teeth from Germany described in 2016 are indeed assignable to the genus. Other teeth from Germany and France, as well as tracks from England, cannot be assigned to any particular genus. A specimen from the Late Cretaceous Jobu Formation of Kumamoto, Japan, consisting of vertebrae, limb bones, and teeth, was assigned to Allosaurus by Minoru Tamura and colleagues in 1991. Burigo and colleagues instead assigned this specimen to Segnosaurus. In 2003, Kurzanov and colleagues assigned six teeth (PIN 4874/2) from Siberia to Allosaurus sp. Carrano and colleagues, in 2012, noted that these teeth are indeterminate beyond Theropoda.

An astragalus (ankle bone) thought to belong to a species of Allosaurus was found at Cape Paterson, Victoria in Early Cretaceous beds in southeastern Australia. In their 1981 description of the specimen, Ralph Molnar and colleagues suggested that it might indicate that Australia was a refugium for animals that had gone extinct elsewhere. This identification was challenged by Samuel Welles in 1983, who thought it more resembled that of an ornithomimid, but the original authors defended their identification in 1985. In 1998, with fifteen years of new specimens and research to look at, Daniel Chure reexamined the bone and found that it was not Allosaurus, but could represent an allosauroid. Similarly, Yoichi Azuma and Phil Currie, in their 2000 description of Fukuiraptor, noted that the bone closely resembled that of their new genus. It may have belonged to Australovenator or a similar taxon, or it may represent an abelisaur.
