= Big Al (dinosaur) =

Allosaurus specimen

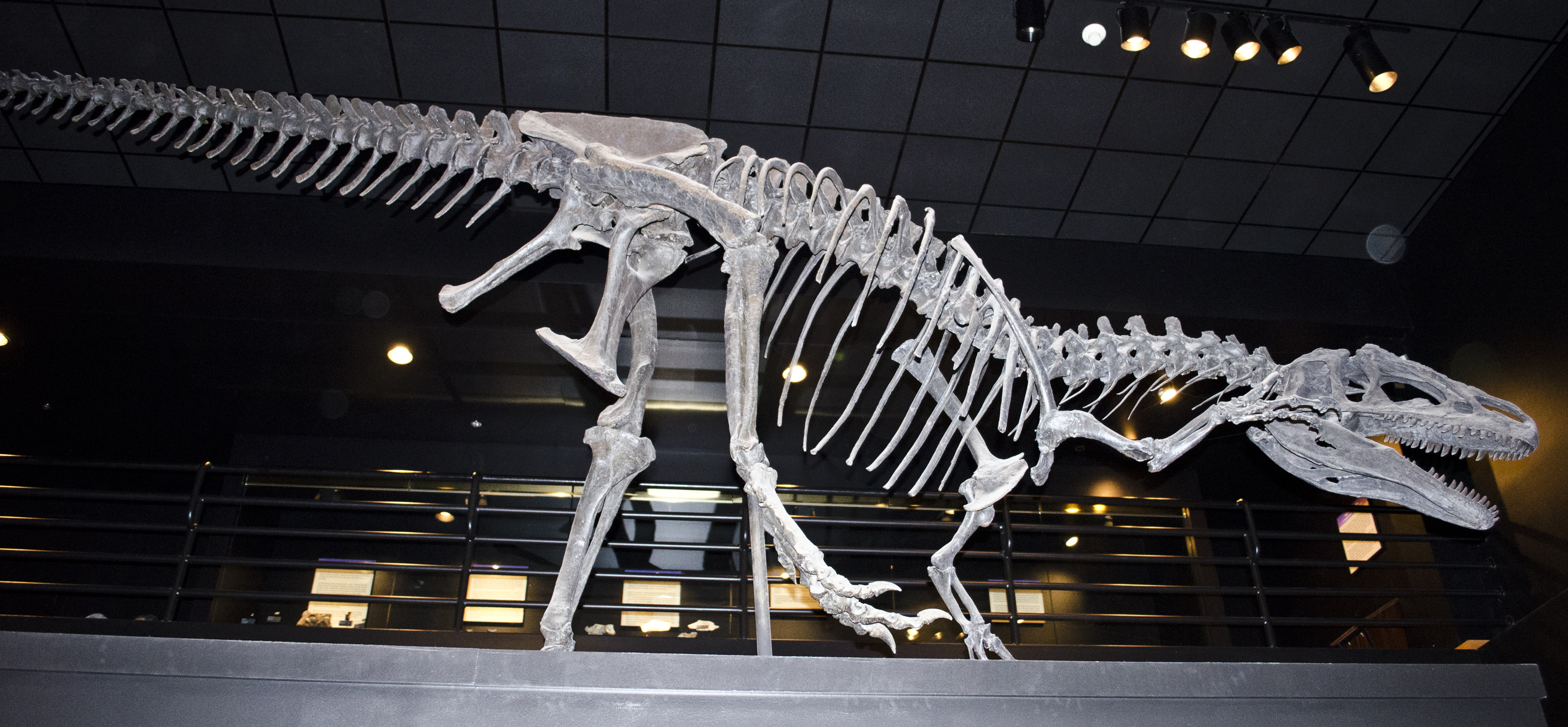
Mounted cast at the Museum of the Rockies

Big Al, officially designated as MOR 693, is a nearly complete fossil Allosaurus skeleton found near Shell, Wyoming, United States, in rocks of the Morrison Formation. The skeleton is about 95% complete and is one of the most complete Allosaurus specimens known; it was the most complete dinosaur specimen found in Wyoming at the time of discovery. Big Al shows 19 pathologies (signs of injury or disease) across the skeleton, most of them traumatic, with some showing evidence of healing. One of the most serious injuries is a large swelling in the first toe bone of the central, weight-bearing digit of the right foot; this bone shows signs of infection and might have caused a limp.

Big Al was discovered in 1991 by a Swiss commercial fossil collecting team led by Kirby Siber. The team began field work in the area in 1990, when they re-opened the historical Howe Quarry. After the latter was depleted, the team encountered an additional locality 300 m (980 ft) to the north, where they excavated Big Al the following summer. While Howe Quarry was on private land, for which the team had permission, the Big Al quarry was on public land, as was subsequently determined by officials from the Bureau of Land Management. The excavation was therefore taken over by the Museum of the Rockies (MOR), where it is stored today. Big Al sparked broad public interest, culminating in the 2000 BBC documentary The Ballad of Big Al.

== History ==
=== Discovery ===
Sitemap of the Big Al Quarry

Big Al was excavated near Howe Quarry in Shell, Wyoming, one of the major fossil localities of the Morrison Formation. Howe Quarry was discovered in the 1920s on private land of the Howe Ranch. In 1934, a team of the American Museum of Natural History (AMNH) led by Barnum Brown recovered about 4,000 fossil bones of various dinosaurs weighing about 30 tons in total, in an area of just 14 by 20 m (46 by 66 ft). The fossils that arrived at the AMNH were subsequently forgotten due to the ongoing Great Depression and Brown's retirement. However, Roland T. Bird, one of Brown's collectors, reported about the excavations in popular articles and books. In his 1985 book Bones for Barnum Brown: Adventures of a Dinosaur Hunter, Bird stated that the quarry had not yet been exhausted, which sparked the interest of other fossil collectors. In 1989, a Swiss team led by Hans-Jakob (Kirby) Siber, who ran the commercial fossil collecting business Siber + Siber, Ltd., resumed excavations at the quarry. The team discovered additional fossils, but the quarry was soon depleted.

Comparison of two nearly-complete specimens of Allosaurus jimmadseni: DINO 11541 from Dinosaur National Monument (top) and MOR 693 "Big Al" (bottom). Missing elements are shown in gray.

For their 1991 field season, Siber's team used a backhoe for test digging in the area directly north of Howe Quarry. About 300 m (980 ft) from the quarry, the backhoe hit sauropod bones that the team subsequently excavated in August. While excavating these bones, several vertebrae of a theropod dinosaur also came to light. More and more bones of this theropod appeared subsequently, and it became clear that a nearly complete and partially articulated skeleton had been found. As the excavators followed the vertebral column, they saw the black enamel of a tooth sticking out of the rock. More teeth, and eventually the jaws and skull, were found. Initially, the skeleton was assumed to be from the theropod Ceratosaurus.

In September, while Siber was attending a mineral and fossil show in Denver, employees of the Bureau of Land Management (BLM) were flying over the area searching for possible wildfires, and observed that a dirt road located on public land had been expanded, apparently without authorization. As the BLM crew investigated the case on ground, they found the dinosaur quarry at the end of the newly expanded road, covered by a tarp. Much of the skeleton had been uncovered at this point, but the bones had not yet been taken out of the quarry. A subsequent investigation by the BLM concluded that the quarry was on public land. The Swiss team did obtain permission to excavate on the private land of Howe Ranch, which includes Howe Quarry but not the area directly north of it; neither the Swiss team nor the local landowners appear to have been aware of the exact land allocation. The Swiss team had to abandon the skeleton, as fossils found on public lands are public goods, but was not penalized.

=== Museum of the Rockies takes over the excavation ===
The BLM, together with the University of Wyoming Geological Museum and the Museum of the Rockies (MOR), took over the excavation of the skeleton. As the Geological Museum lacked staff and resources to excavate and prepare the skeleton, it was to become part of the Museum of the Rockies collection. The excavation party consisted of staff and students of the Museum of the Rockies as well as Brent Breithaupt, curator of the Geological Museum, who created a sitemap recording the original positions of the individual bones. Before the bones were taken out, they were wrapped in plaster to avoid breakage (plaster jacketing). Quick action was required as the excavation began only in September and the specimen had to be taken out before the onset of winter; Breithaupt called it a "salvage operation".

Mounted cast of 'Big Al' (MOR 693) at the University of Wyoming Geological Museum

The quarry was initially called the 'Siber Quarry', but was soon renamed the 'Big Al Quarry', after the new nickname of the specimen, now identified as Allosaurus. The name 'Big Al' does not allude to the body size of the individual (which was, in fact, a subadult and comparatively small), but to the scientific importance of this nearly complete specimen. The excavation was widely publicized, including in newspapers and on CNN, resulting in several thousands of spectators who came to witness the progressing excavation. After eight days of excavation, the skeleton had been packed and was brought to the Museum of the Rockies for preparation. Several additional bones were recovered by the Museum of the Rockies in the following two years.

Despite having to give up "Big Al", the Swiss team continued to collect at Howe Ranch, excavating a nearly complete skeleton of Camarasaurus (nicknamed "E.T.") the following year, and another nearly complete Allosaurus skeleton (SMA 0005, nicknamed "Big Al II") in 1996, just a few hundred meters from the Big Al quarry. The successful excavations at Howe Ranch led to the founding of the Aathal Dinosaur Museum in Switzerland in 1992.

=== Exhibits and media coverage ===
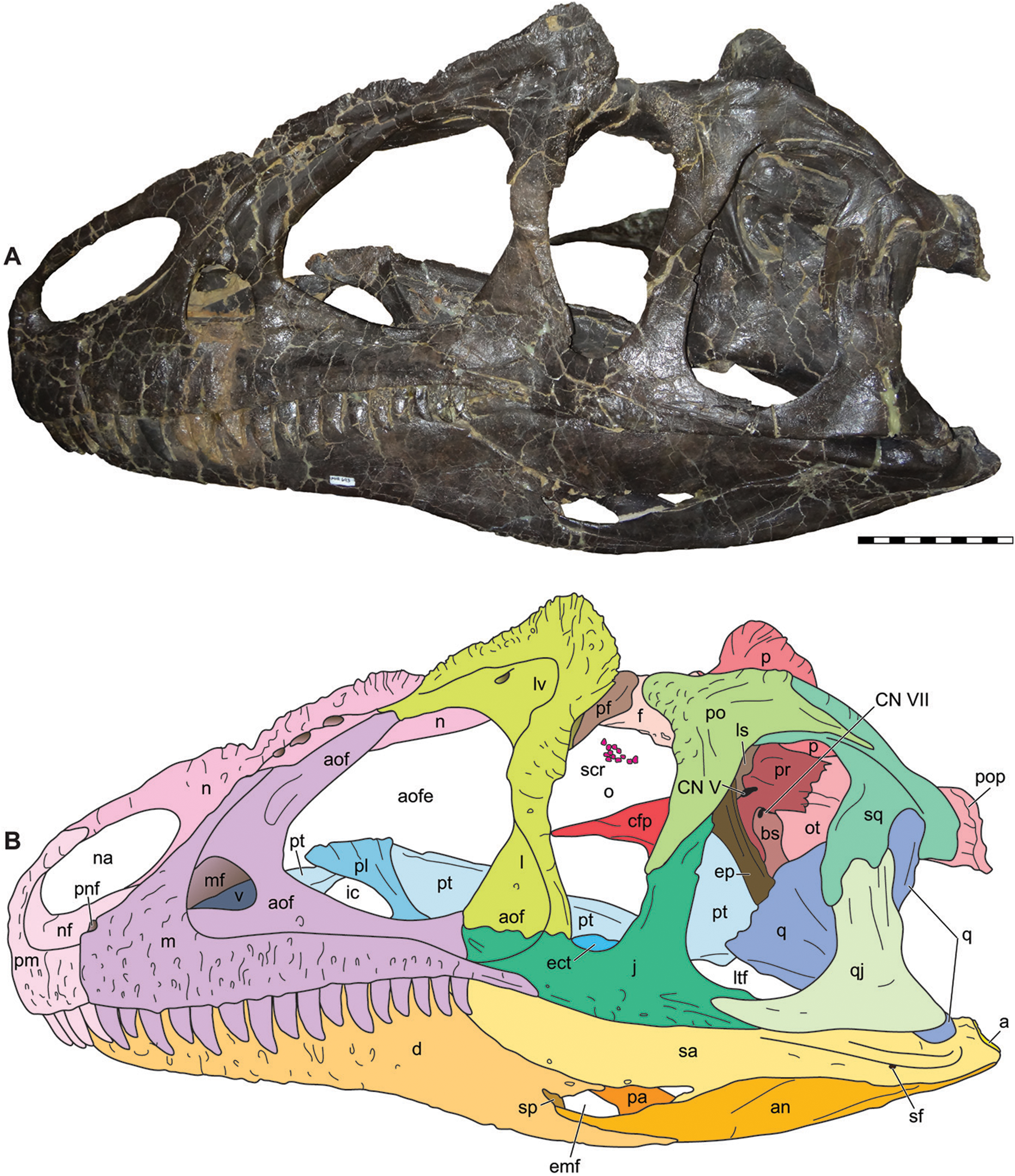
Skull of Big Al

Fossil preparation at the Museum of the Rockies lasted from 1991 to 1995. After preparation, polyurethane casts of the bones were made. Such copies are much lighter than the original bone and therefore allow for more lifelike body postures when mounted. The first cast was finished in 1995 and then sent to Laramie, where it was mounted in the exhibit hall of the Geological Museum in December. A second cast was used for the Museum of the Rockies traveling exhibit 'T. rex on Trial'. After receiving funds from private sponsors, the Geological Museum prepared a new exhibit centered around Big Al's life that was set to open in 2001. As the museum was preparing the exhibit, the British Broadcasting Corporation (BBC) proposed a collaboration on a special episode about Big Al, as part of the nature documentary television series Walking with Dinosaurs. This episode, dubbed The Ballad of Big Al, was aired in December 2000.

== Classification and dating ==
Big Al has initially been assigned to the species Allosaurus fragilis, the type species of Allosaurus. In 2020, Daniel Chure and Mark Loewen described the skull anatomy of 'Big Al' and another nearly complete specimen (DINO 11541) that was discovered at Dinosaur National Monument in 1990. These authors found that both specimens belonged to a new species of Allosaurus, which they described as Allosaurus jimmadseni. The specimen "Big Al II" was also assigned to this species.

'Big Al' was found just above the bone-bearing layer of the nearby Howe Quarry, and belongs to the lower part of the Brushy Basin Member of the lower Morrison Formation. In the 1990s, the fossil has been estimated at 145 or 152 million years old, but more recent datings constrain it to an older date of 153 to 157 million years ago. According to Chure and Loewen in 2020, these dates would correspond to the Kimmeridgian age of the Late Jurassic.

== Description and size ==
Digital model of Big Al used by Bates and colleagues to estimate body weight

Approximately 95% of the skeleton has been recovered, making Big Al one of the most complete Allosaurus specimens known. At the time of discovery, it was also the most complete dinosaur fossil discovered in Wyoming. The skull was found in articulation (with individual bones still connected together) and lying on its left side; it was still attached to the first six neck vertebrae. The teeth of the upper jaw are overlapping the lower jaw, and the lower jaw is slightly shorter than the upper jaw, creating an overbite; both features are typical for theropods. During fossilization, the skull was flattened sideways, and would originally have been about 20% wider. The skull also preserves parts of the scleral ring of the eye as well as hyoids, bones that supported the tongue. Most of the tail is missing.

Big Al was a subadult of unknown sex, and not yet fully grown. In 2001, Breithaupt estimated that it reached 60 to 70% of adult size. According to Scott Hartman, the individual would have been 6.9 m (23 ft) in body length. In 2009, Karl Bates and colleagues estimated the body weight of Big Al based on a 3D model of the mounted cast in the Geological Museum that they obtained using laser scanning. Around the digital skeleton, the researchers modeled the respective soft tissues. Because the volumes of body parts and air sacs can only be roughly estimated, the researchers used different plausible values (sensitivity analysis). The mass was estimated to be between 1,350 and 1,850 kg (2,980 and 4,080 lb).

== Pathologies ==
Big Al preserves 19 pathologies (signs of injury or disease) across the skeleton, many of which show signs of healing, though some would have seriously impeded the individual during life and possibly contributed to its death. The pathologies were studied by Rebecca Hanna in 2002, who also made thin-sections of six bones to study the inner bone structure.

Pathological toe bone in the right foot of "Big Al", indicating osteomyelitis

One of the most serious pathologies is found in the right foot, where the first bone of the middle toe is greatly swollen due to a chronic infection (osteomyelitis), causing it to push against the outer toes. Another infection in the fifth metatarsal of the right foot would have caused a large swelling. Both infections were probably painful and could have resulted in a limp. The left foot shows injuries of the third metatarsal and a claw, though these were probably less severe than those of the right foot. The right hand shows a fracture along the first bone of the second finger, which also became infected and likely caused swelling and shortening of the second finger. This infection, as well as one in the fourth rib and those in right foot, would have been suppurative (producing pus). Other pathologies in Big Al were probably less serious for the individual. Calluses (thickenings) with healed fractures in several ribs of the right side were likely caused by external force. Bone growths of unknown cause in several of the vertebrae would not have impeded movement. An impact on the base of the tail fractured a chevron bone which subsequently healed; this injury is estimated to have occurred between 6 and 24 months before the death of the individual.

== Taphonomy ==
Big Al seen from the upper left

In a 1999 study, Stephen Hasiotis and colleagues analysed borings of beetle larvae in the bones to reconstruct the taphonomy of Big Al (the events between death and fossilization). Such borings are present on 12–15% of the bones, especially on the hip bones, the right hind limb, and the left coracoid; they are usually less than 4 mm (0.16 in) in depth and less than 5 mm (0.20 in) in diameter and have circular to elliptical openings. Hasiotis and colleagues attribute these borings to the larvae of dermestid beetles (also known as skin or carpet beetles). Today, these beetles typically feed on skin and bone and are drawn to dry and leathery carcasses; they may bore into bone to feed on the bone marrow or to create chambers for pupation. According to Hasiotis and colleagues, the borings indicate that the carcass must have dried out before final burial. The skeleton was found in a opisthotonic death pose, with the head and tail thrown back above the body; Hasiotis and colleagues attributed this to ligament desiccation. The bones lack signs of scavenging by other dinosaurs, suggesting that Big Al died while the environment was highly stressed; the individual might have failed to find sufficient water or food during the dry season. The authors suggest that the time between death and complete burial was probably between 2.5 and 5 months.

In 2001, Breithaupt noted that the left side of the specimen, in particular of the limb, hip, and skull, is better preserved and articulated than the right side, suggesting that the carcass lay on its left side while the right side was exposed. He also suggested that the carcass became gradually buried during several subsequent floods at the beginning of the rainy season, during which the skeleton partly disarticulated. These floods would not have moved the carcass for a longer distance, as indicated by the completeness of the specimen. The right ilium (upper pelvis bone) was displaced by several meters. The ischia and pubes (lower pelvis bones) were displaced towards the front of the skeleton, possibly as a result of gases filling the body cavity that resulted in a tilting of the carcass. During subsequent flooding events, the spine of the carcass might have created an eddy that would have led to the observed scattering of smaller bones downstream.
