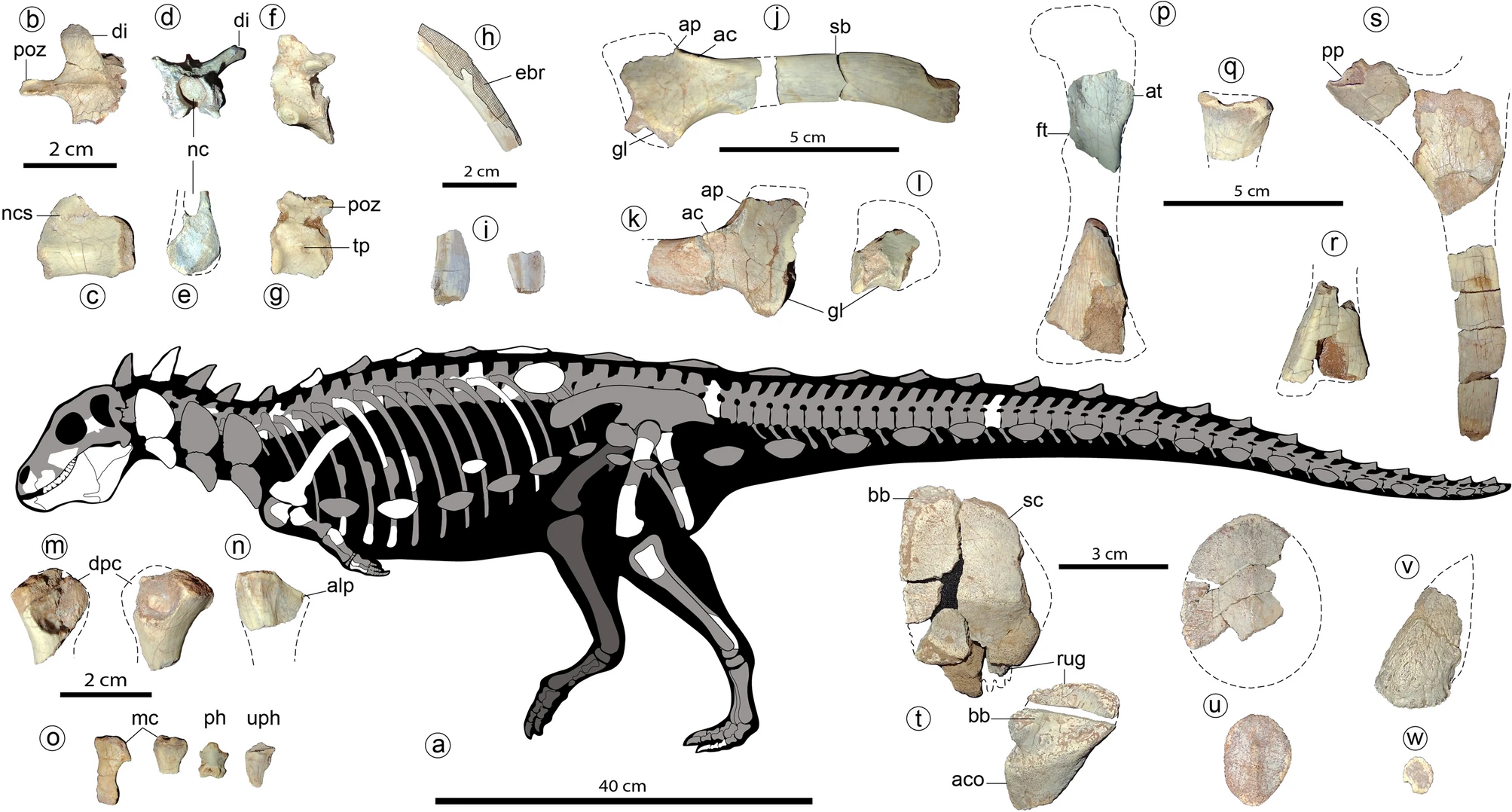
- Skeletal diagram showing known fossil material

Scientific classification
- Kingdom: Animalia
- Phylum: Chordata
- Class: Reptilia
- Clade: Dinosauria
- Clade: †Ornithischia
- Clade: †Thyreophora
- Genus: †Jakapil; Riguetti et al., 2022
- Species: †J. kaniukura

Binomial name
- †Jakapil kaniukura Riguetti et al., 2022

= Jakapil =

Jakapil Temporal range: Early Cretaceous (Albian), ~111–106 Ma

Extinct genus of dinosaurs

Jakapil (meaning "shield bearer" in Puelchean) is a genus of basal thyreophoran dinosaur from the Early Cretaceous (Albian age) Candeleros Formation of Argentina. The type species is Jakapil kaniukura.

== Discovery and naming ==
The holotype, MPCA-PV-630, is a partial skeleton including several osteoderms and a complete lower jaw, which were found on land owned by the Mariluan family in 2012 and excavated between 2014 and 2019/2020. The finds were prepared by L. Pazo and J. Kaluza. The generic name, "Jakapil", is derived from "Ja-Kapïl", a Puelchean word meaning "shield bearer". This is also the literal meaning of the clade name Thyreophora. The specific name, "kaniukura", means "crest stone" in Mapudungun, in reference to its uniquely deep jaw.

== Description ==
Size compared to a human

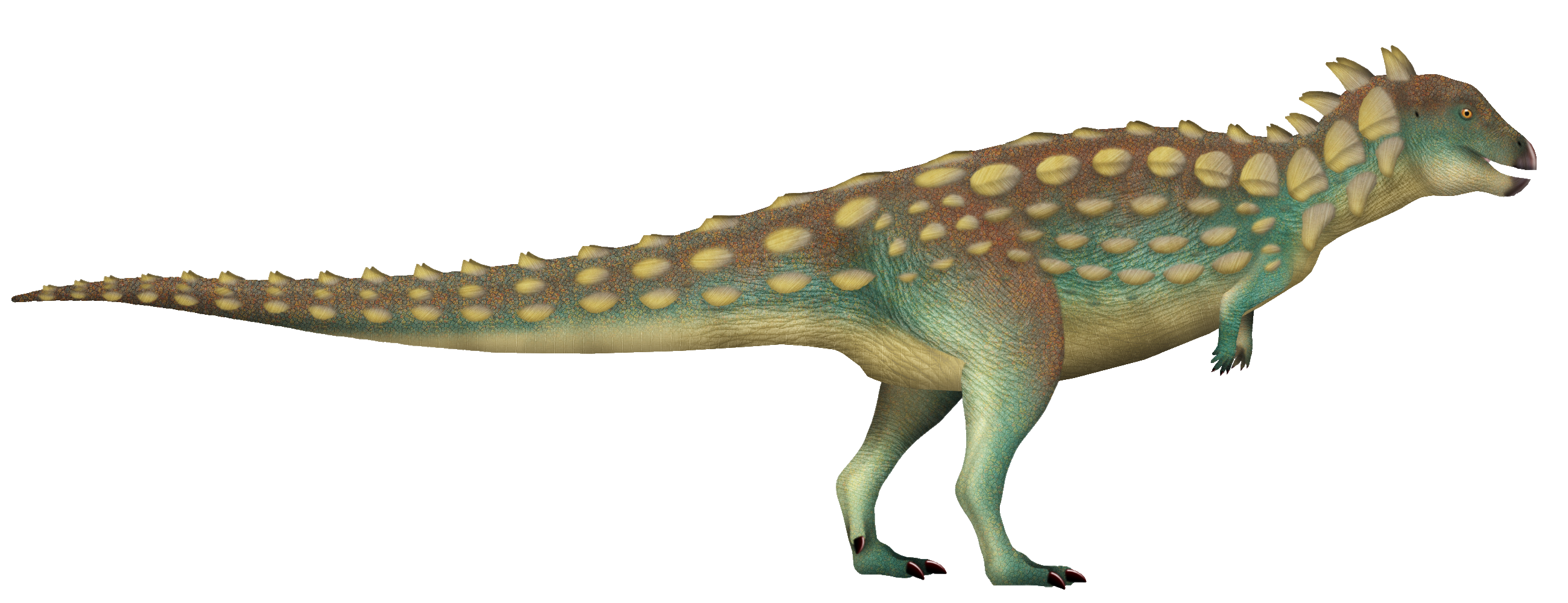
Speculative life restoration

Jakapil represents a novel morphotype among thyreophorans, including, among other things, the presence of a predentary bone (absent or cartilaginous in other basal thyreophorans), large, low osteoderms, and a bipedal stance, similar to Scutellosaurus. Its describers estimate it to be less than 1.5 metres (4.9 ft) long and 4.5–7 kilograms (9.9–15.4 lb) in weight, based on femoral circumference. While the holotype remains do not represent a juvenile individual, it was likely not fully grown and may not have been sexually mature.

== Classification ==
Due to a combination of features seen in basal ornithischians, basal thyreophorans, and ankylosaurs, a phylogenetic analysis placed it, according to most data matrices, as a basal thyreophoran, outside the clade Eurypoda. Riguetti and colleagues (2022) suggested that Jakapil represents a member of a previously unknown thyreophoran clade. This clade may have diverged from the rest of the thyreophorans during the Sinemurian. Its discovery in the Late Cretaceous implies the existence of a long basal thyreophoran ghost lineage.

- Thyreophora
  - Scutellosaurus
  - - Emausaurus
    - Scelidosaurus
    - - Jakapil
      - Eurypoda
        - Stegosauria
        - Ankylosauria

The status of Jakapil as a thyreophoran has been disputed by some researchers; a study focused on the phylogenetic relationships of the Thyreophora noted that the only thyreophoran characteristic it possessed was dermal armor, while presenting features not present in any other thyreophoran. The premaxilla of Jakapil had no teeth, a feature not known in any thyreophoran, while the shape and depth of the dentary are more similar to those of basal neoceratopsians. Additionally, the teeth of Jakapil have a morphology distinct from any other ornithischian. Therefore, the study concluded that Jakapil most likely represents an armored marginocephalian or a member of a yet to be known lineage of non-thyreophoran ornithischians.

In their 2024 analyses, Fonseca and colleagues recovered Jakapil as either the sister taxon to Eurypoda or as the basalmost member of Ankylosauria. They argued that Jakapil is likely not a ceratopsian or marginocephalian, since this would require 16 additional steps. However, a position within Parankylosauria only required four additional steps. As such, the authors suggested that this possibility should not be disregarded, even though it is not the most parsimonious position for the taxon.

== Paleobiology ==
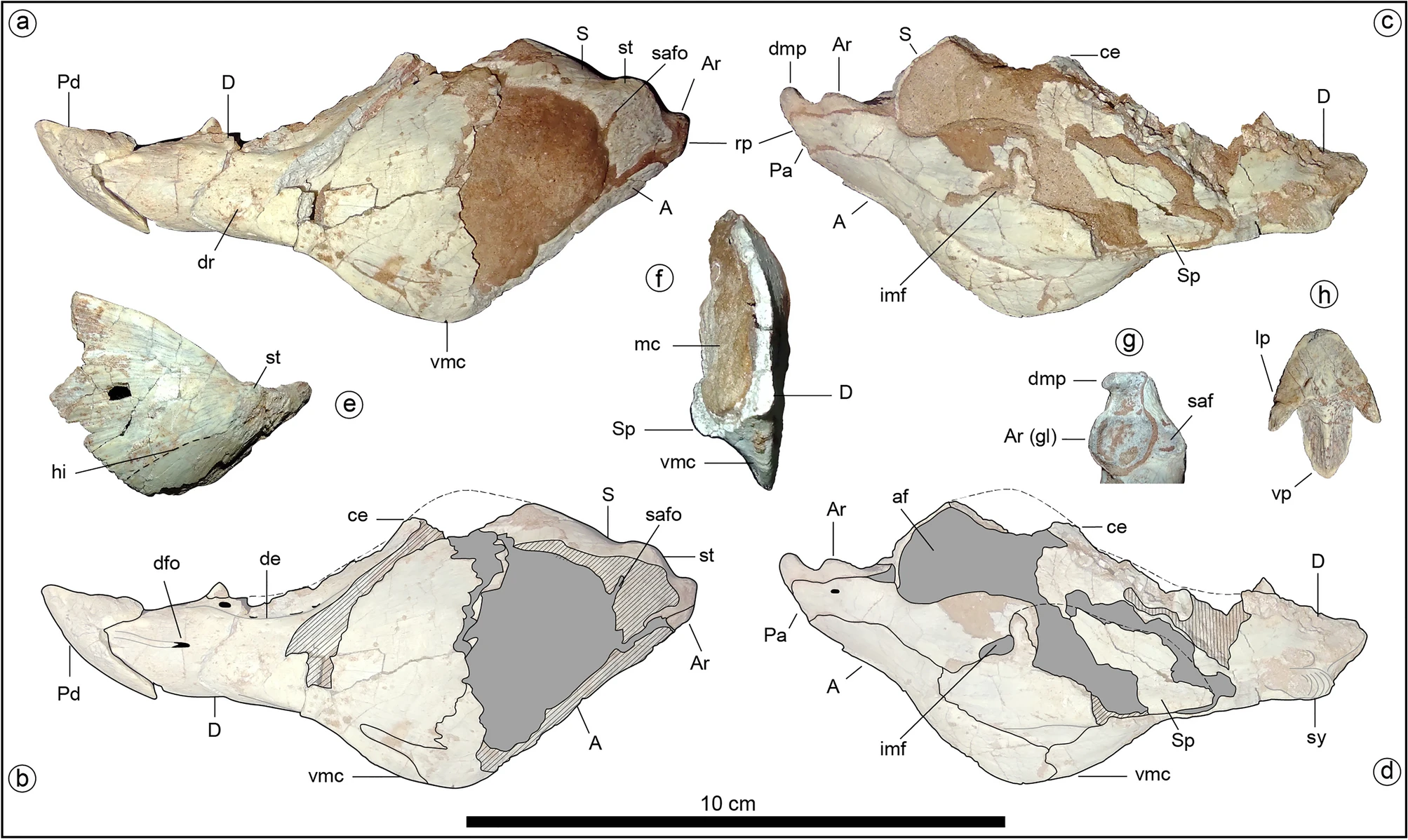
Holotype lower jaw

In light of its straight, narrow snout, Riguetti and colleagues (2022) suggested that Jakapil did not use its teeth and jaws to shear leaves, but instead likely processed tough plant material via mastication, as evidenced by the high amount of wear on the teeth.

== Paleoenvironment ==
The Candeleros Formation is interpreted as an ancient desert known as the Kokorkom desert, with some oases in it, and its fossils represent a faunal assemblage typical of Mid-Cretaceous ecosystems in the western remnants of Gondwana. Originally suggested to be the Cenomanian age of the Late Cretaceous, the maximum depositional age of both the Candeleros Formation and the overlying Huincul Formation is re-dated to the early Albian by Maniel et al. (2026), approximately 111.4 ± 1.1 Ma and 106.2 ± 1.0 Ma respectively. Other animals from this formation include the rhynchocephalians Tika and Priosphenodon, the snake Najash, the mammal Cronopio dentiacutus, the theropods Alnashetri, Buitreraptor, Ekrixinatosaurus, and Giganotosaurus, as well as the sauropods Andesaurus and Limaysaurus.
