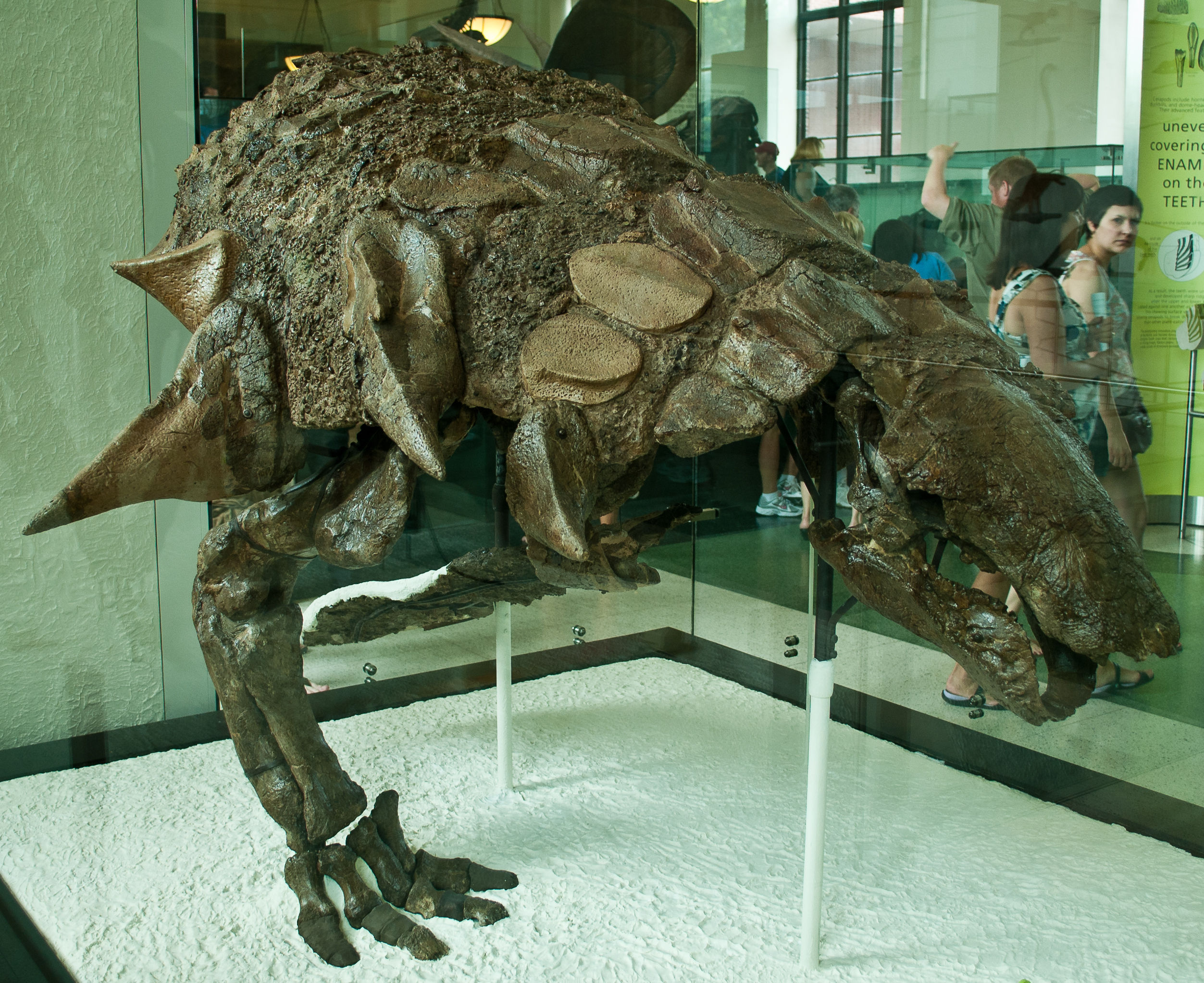
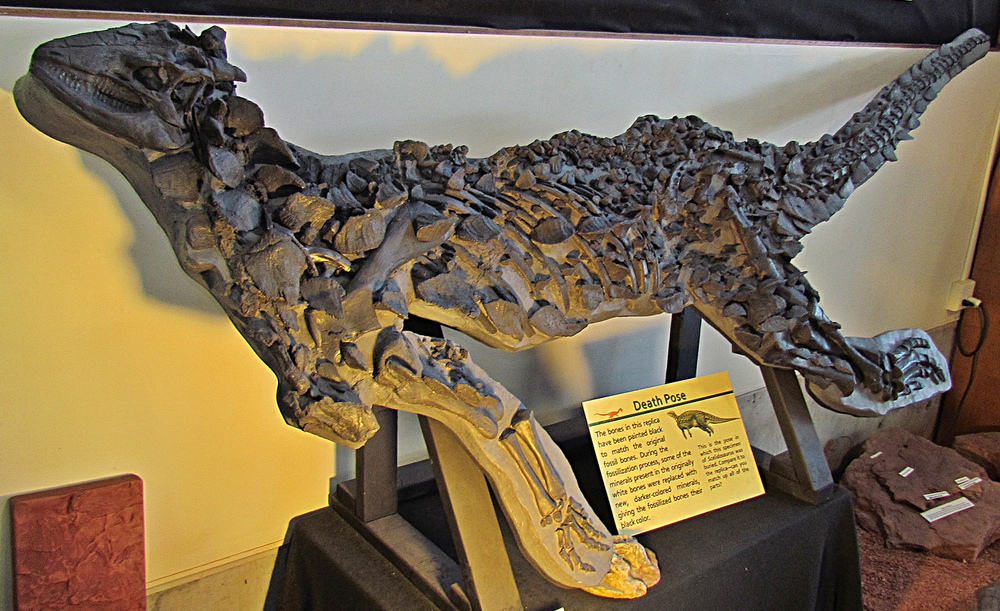
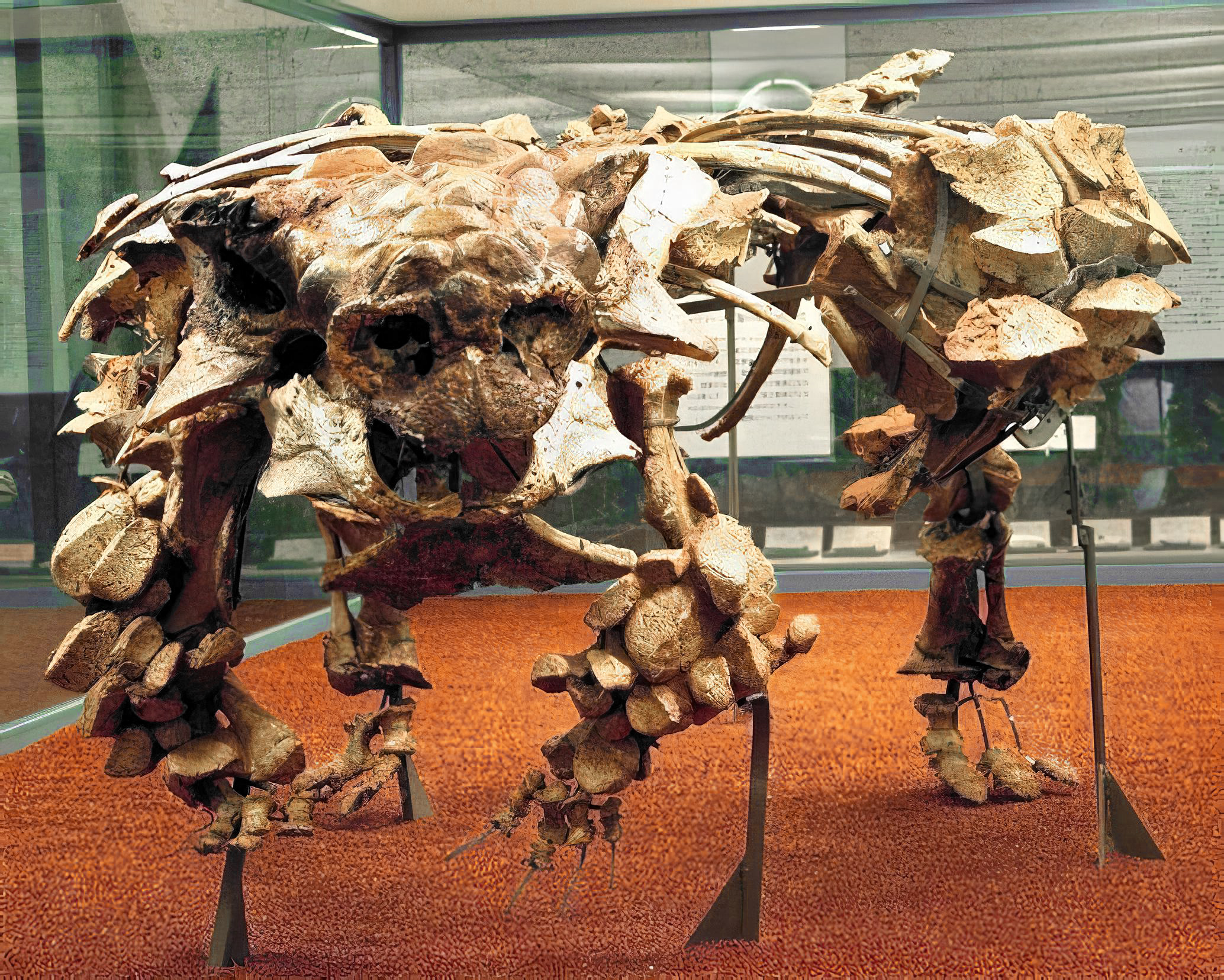
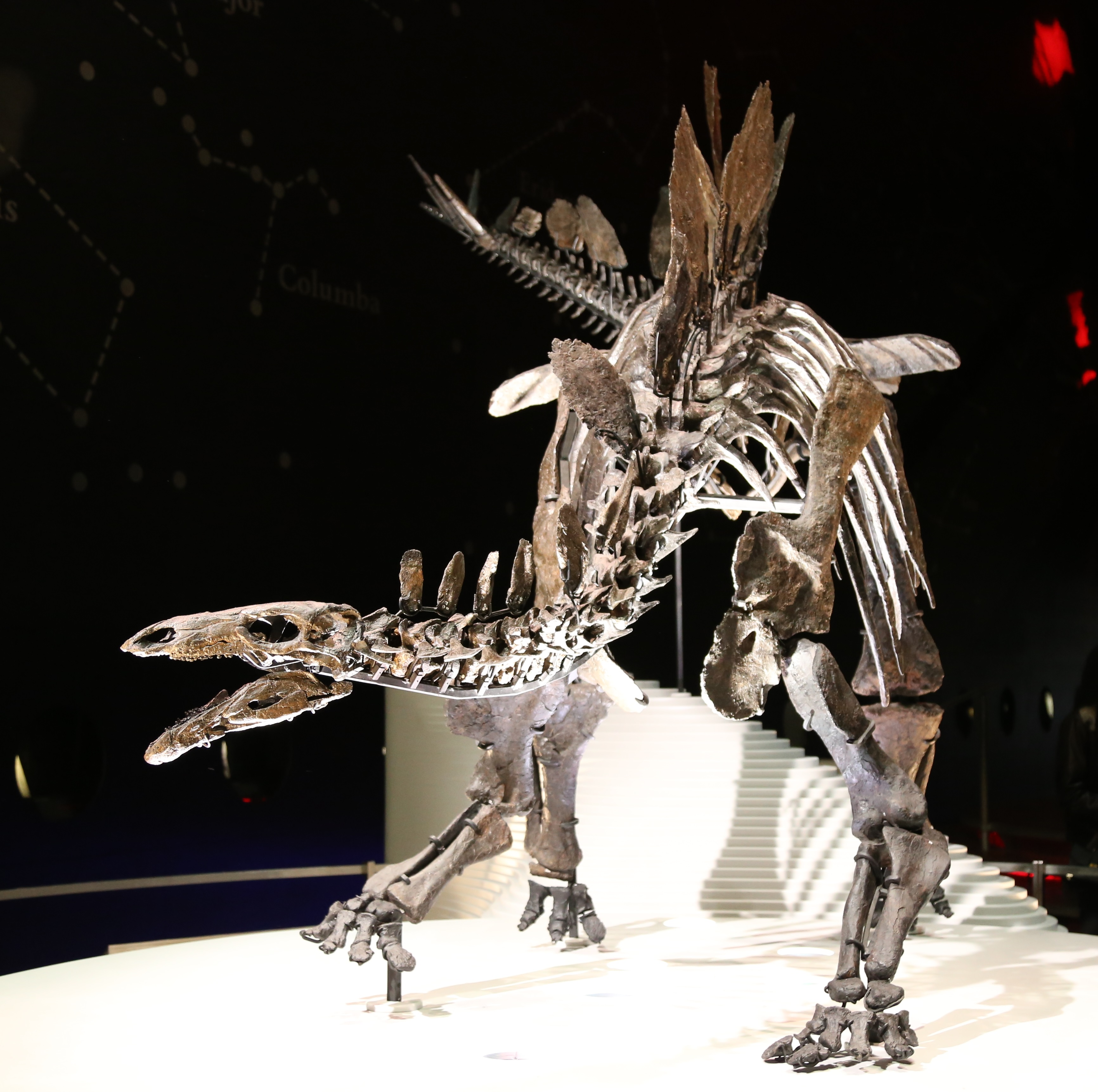
- Four armored dinosaurs. Clockwise from top left: Edmontonia (a nodosaur), Scelidosaurus (an early thyreophoran), Stegosaurus (a stegosaur), and Saichania (an ankylosaur)

Scientific classification
- Kingdom: Animalia
- Phylum: Chordata
- Class: Reptilia
- Clade: Dinosauria
- Clade: †Ornithischia
- Clade: †Genasauria
- Clade: †Thyreophora; Nopcsa, 1915

Subgroups
- †Bienosaurus; †Emausaurus; †Laquintasaura?; †Lesothosaurus?; †Scutellosaurus; †Tatisaurus; †Thyreophoroidea Nopcsa, 1928; †Jakapil?; †Scelidosaurus; †Yuxisaurus?; †Eurypoda Sereno, 1986; †Ankylosauria; †Stegosauria
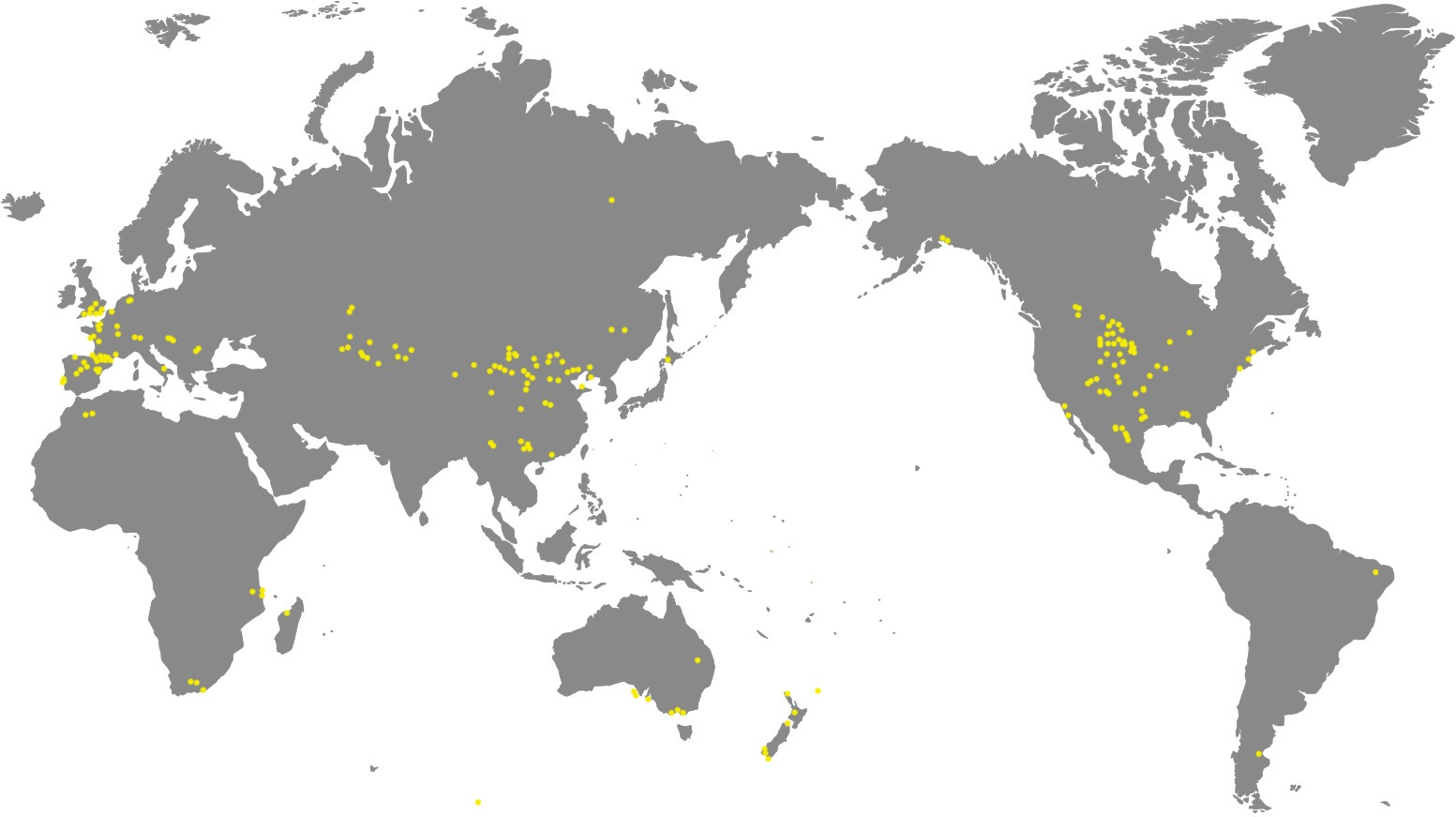
- Thyreophorans distribution map

= Thyreophora =

Thyreophora Temporal range: Early Jurassic-Late Cretaceous, 200.91–66 Ma

Extinct clade of dinosaurs

Thyreophora ("shield bearers"), often known simply as armored dinosaurs is a group of armored ornithischian dinosaurs that lived from the Early Jurassic until the end of the Cretaceous.

Thyreophorans are characterized by the presence of body armor lined up in longitudinal rows along the body. Primitive forms had simple, low, keeled scutes or osteoderms, whereas more derived forms developed more elaborate structures including spikes and plates. Most thyreophorans were herbivorous and had relatively small brains for their body size.

Thyreophora includes two major subgroups, Ankylosauria and Stegosauria. In both clades, the forelimbs were much shorter than the hindlimbs, particularly in stegosaurs. Thyreophora has been defined as the group consisting of all species more closely related to Ankylosaurus and Stegosaurus than to Iguanodon and Triceratops. It is the sister group of Cerapoda within Genasauria.

== Characteristics ==
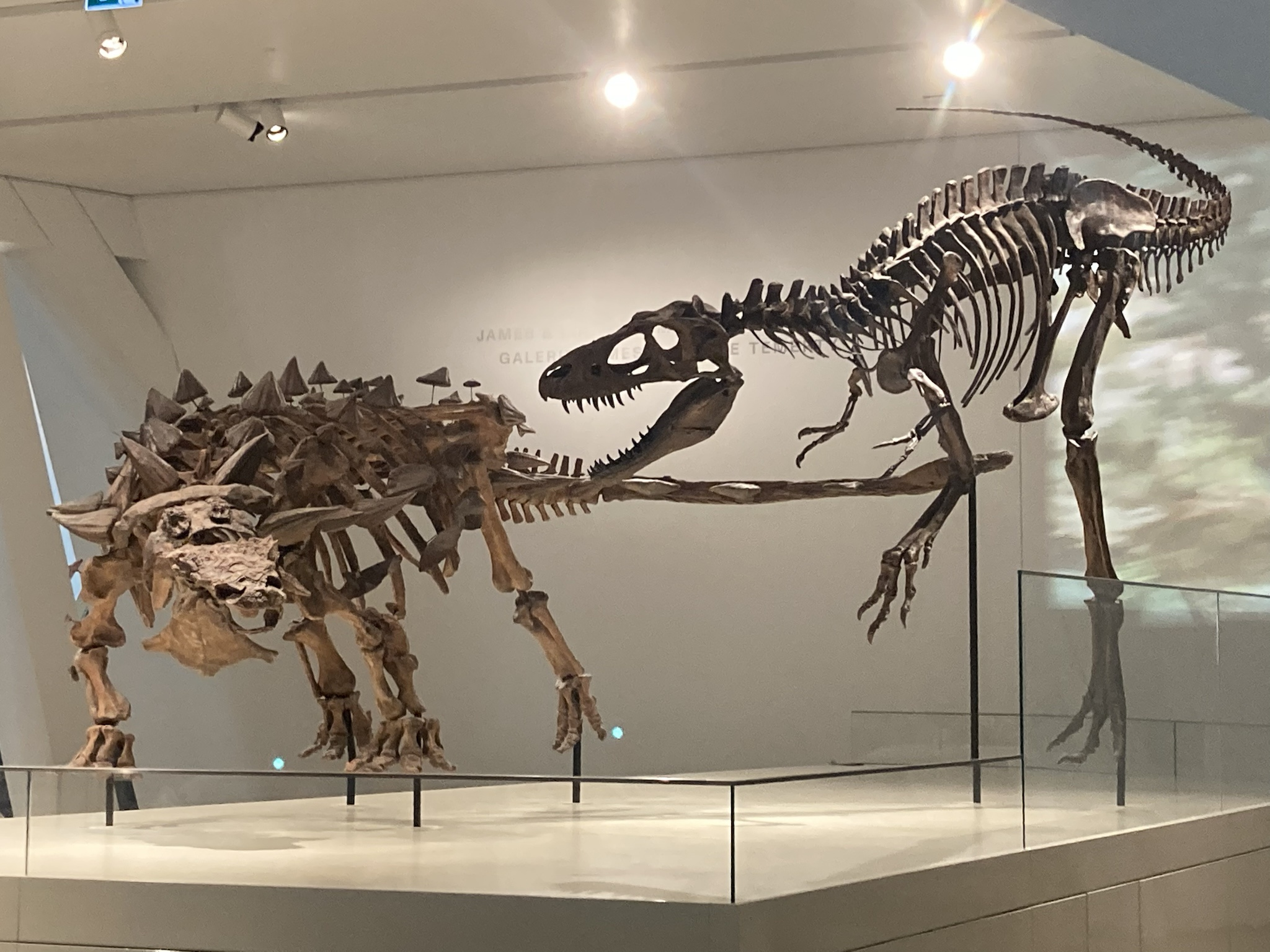
Mount of ankylosaurid Zuul using its tail club to fight off Gorgosaurus

Members of Thyreophora are characterised by the presence of osteoderms (bony growths within the skin), with these osteoderms having lateral keels. Characters of the skull and jaws distinctive (synapomorphic) of thyreophorans include "absence of a deep elliptic fossa along the sutural line of the nasals, presence of a wide jugal, remodeling of skull dermal bone, down-turned dentary tooth row". Among primitive thyreophorans, Scutellosaurus was likely primarily bipedal, while the more quadrupedally adapted Scelidosaurus may have been bipedal for some of the time, particularly as a juvenile. Stegosaurs and ankylosaurs are thought to have been obligately quadrupedal.

== Classification ==
=== Taxonomy ===
While ranked taxonomy has largely fallen out of favor among dinosaur paleontologists, a few 21st century publications have retained the use of ranks, though sources have differed on what its rank should be. Most have listed Thyreophora as an unranked taxon containing the traditional suborders Stegosauria and Ankylosauria, though Thyreophora is also sometimes classified as a suborder, with Ankylosauria and Stegosauria as infraorders.

=== Phylogeny ===
Thyreophora was first named by Nopcsa in 1915. Thyreophora was defined as a clade by Paul Sereno in 1998, as "all genasaurs more closely related to Ankylosaurus than to Triceratops". Thyreophoroidea was first named by Nopcsa in 1928 and defined by Sereno in 1986, as "Scelidosaurus, Ankylosaurus, their most recent common ancestor and all of its descendants". Eurypoda was first named by Sereno in 1986 and defined by him in 1998, as "Stegosaurus, Ankylosaurus, their most recent common ancestor and all of their descendants".

In 2021, an international group of researchers led by Daniel Madzia registered almost all of the most commonly used ornithischian clades under the International Code of Phylogenetic Nomenclature, with the intent of standardizing their definitions. According to Madzia et al., Thyreophora is defined as the largest clade containing Ankylosaurus magniventris and Stegosaurus stenops but not Iguanodon bernissartensis and Triceratops horridus. They also defined the less inclusive Eurypoda as "the smallest clade containing Ankylosaurus magniventris and Stegosaurus stenops" to include the ankylosaurs and stegosaurs to the exclusion of basal thyreophorans. A later study conducted by André Fonseca and colleagues in 2024 gave a formal definition for Thyreophoroidea in the PhyloCode as "the smallest clade containing Ankylosaurus magniventris, Scelidosaurus harrisonii, and Stegosaurus stenops".

The following cladogram shows the results of the phylogenetic analysis Soto-Acuña et al. (2021). In their description of Jakapil the following year, Riguetti et al modified the same matrix and found it to occupy a position as the sister taxon to the Eurypoda. A similar result was found by Fonseca et al. in 2024.

- Thyreophora
  - - Laquintasaura
    - Lesothosaurus
  - - - Emausaurus
      - Scutellosaurus
    - - Thyreophoroidea
        - - Scelidosauridae
            Scelidosaurus
        - - Yuxisaurus
          - - Jakapil
            - - Eurypoda
                - Stegosauria
                - - Ankylosauria
                    - Parankylosauria
                    - Euankylosauria

In 2020, as part of his monograph on Scelidosaurus, David Norman revised the relationships of early thyreophorans, finding that Stegosauria was the most basal branch, with Scutellosaurus, Emausaurus and Scelidosaurus being progressive stem groups to Ankylosauria, rather than to Stegosauria+Ankylosauria. A cladogram is given below:

- Thyreophora
  - Stegosauria
  - - Scutellosaurus
    - - Emausaurus
      - - Scelidosaurus
        - Ankylosauria

== See also ==
- thyreophoroi, Greek soldiers bearing a thyreos shield
- List of thyreophoran type specimens
