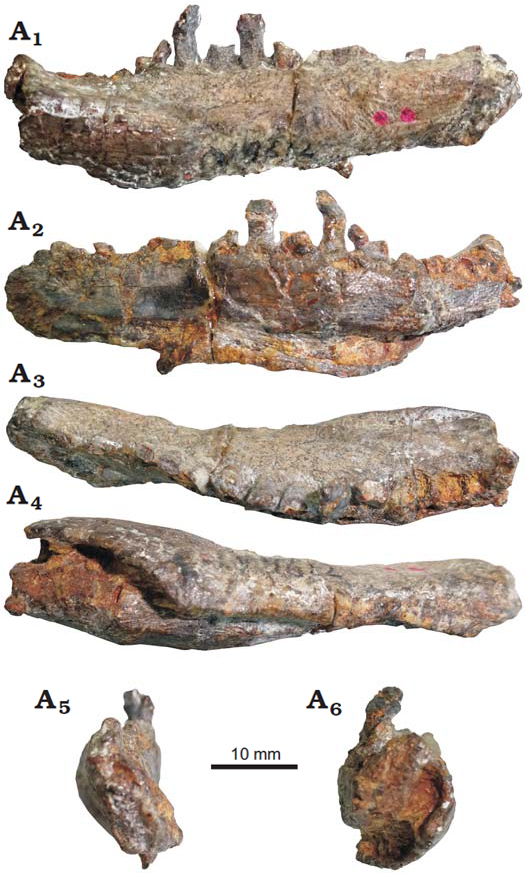
- Holotype right dentary

Scientific classification
- Kingdom: Animalia
- Phylum: Chordata
- Class: Reptilia
- Clade: Dinosauria
- Clade: †Ornithischia
- Clade: †Saphornithischia
- Clade: †Genasauria
- Clade: †Thyreophora
- Genus: †Bienosaurus; Dong, 2001
- Species: †B. lufengensis

Binomial name
- †Bienosaurus lufengensis Dong, 2001

= Bienosaurus =

Bienosaurus Temporal range: Early Jurassic, Hettangian–Sinemurian

Extinct genus of dinosaurs

Bienosaurus (meaning "Boien's lizard) is a dubious genus of thyreophoran dinosaur from the Early Jurassic (probably Hettangian to Sinemurian) Lower Lufeng Formation of Yunnan Province in China.

== Discovery and species ==
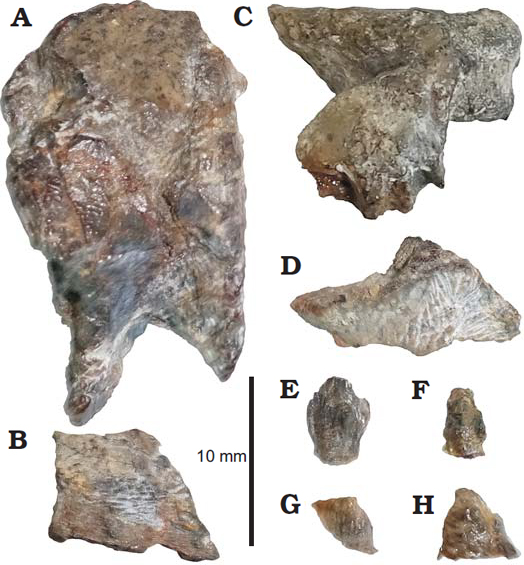
Skull bones of the holotype

The Lufeng Basin in China has been a location for the collection of Early Jurassic dinosaurs since 1938. In 1938 and 1939 Chinese paleontologist Mei Nien Bien collected material from the Dark Red Beds of the lower Lufeng Formation that included the nearly complete jaw and partial skull of a relative of the armored dinosaur Scelidosaurus, though it was not described as such until 2001. In 2001, Chinese paleontologist Dong Zhiming described this specimen, IVPP V 9612, as a new member of the family Scelidosauridae, Bienosaurus lufengensis. The genus name is in honor of the collector Bien and combines with it the Ancient Greek word σαυρος (sauros) for "lizard", while the specific name is for the Lufeng Basin where the holotype skull was found. The species name was originally going to honor Michael Crichton, author of Jurassic Park, as "Bienosaurus crichtoni". As it comes from the lower Lufeng Formation, Bienosaurus would be one of the earliest known ornithischians, living in the Hettangian to Sinemurian of the Early Jurassic.

Bienosaurus was revisited by British paleontologists Thomas Raven, Paul Barrett, Susannah Maidment and Chinese paleontologist Xu Xing in 2019. They noted that the holotype number given by Dong, IVPP V 9612, was already in use for the holotype of Sinornithoides, and that Bienosaurus had been reassigned the specimen number IVPP V15311 instead. As well, due to the incomplete and fragmentary nature of the material, it could not be distinguished from other thyreophorans and was thus dubious, with the possibility that it could represent the same taxon as Tatisaurus from the same formation. It does show anatomy typical of an early thyreophoran like Scelidosaurus, but no unique features to support Scelidosauridae.

== Phylogeny ==
Dong in 2001 placed Bienosaurus in the Scelidosauridae, considering these to be part of the Ankylosauria. Later publications suggested a general position basal in the Thyreophora. In 2019 a study confirmed this, concluding Bienosaurus was a nomen dubium, possibly identical to Tatisaurus from the same formation.
