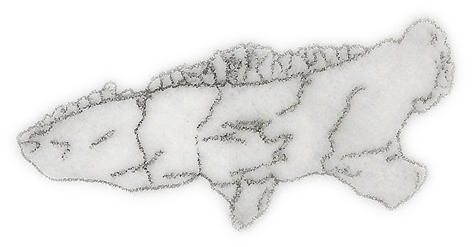
- Jaw

Scientific classification
- Kingdom: Animalia
- Phylum: Chordata
- Class: Reptilia
- Clade: Dinosauria
- Clade: †Ornithischia
- Clade: †Thyreophora
- Genus: †Tatisaurus; Simmons, 1965
- Species: †T. oehleri

Binomial name
- †Tatisaurus oehleri Simmons, 1965

Synonyms
- Bienosaurus lufengensis? Dong, 2001; Scelidosaurus oehleri (Simmons, 1965) Lucas, 1996

= Tatisaurus =

Tatisaurus Temporal range: Early Jurassic, Sinemurian

Extinct genus of dinosaurs

Tatisaurus is a genus of ornithischian dinosaur from the Early Jurassic from the Lower Lufeng Formation in Yunnan Province in China. Little is known as the remains are fragmentary. The type species is T. oehleri.

== Discovery and species ==
In 1948 and 1949 Father Edgar Oehler, a Catholic priest working for the Fu Jen Catholic University at Beijing, excavated fossils near the village of Da Di in Yunnan. Among them was the jaw bone of a herbivorous dinosaur. In 1965 David Jay Simmons named and described it as the type species Tatisaurus oehleri. The generic name is derived from Da Di, then more usually spelled as "Ta Ti". The specific name honours Oehler. The holotype, FMNH CUP 2088, was found in the Zhangjiawa Beds of the Lufeng Formation, dating from the Sinemurian. It consists of a partial left mandible with teeth. The lower jaw bone fragment is, lacking the tip, six centimetres long. The teeth are eroded. It is the only specimen known of the species.

Simmons assigned Tatisaurus to the Hypsilophodontidae, though this group was seen by him as an evolutionary grade of "primitive" Ornithopoda, ancestral to several ornithischian groups. He felt that Tatisaurus' affinities were with Scelidosaurus or the Ankylosauria. Later, in 1990, the specimen was reviewed by Dong Zhiming, who noted it had similarities with Huayangosaurus. He placed the two genera in the same subfamily, the Huayangosaurinae, within the Stegosauria.

Later still, in 1996, Spencer Lucas reclassified Tatisaurus oehleri as a species of Scelidosaurus, S. oehleri, in order to use Scelidosaurus for a biochron. In 2007, David B. Norman and colleagues regarded this as unfounded. They instead found Tatisaurus to be a dubious basal thyreophoran, showing a single thyreophorean synapomorphy; a ventrally deflected mesial end of the dentary. If considered a thyreophoran, it would be one of the oldest known members of the group.

In 2019 a study concluded that Bienosaurus was a nomen dubium, possibly identical to Tatisaurus from the same formation.
