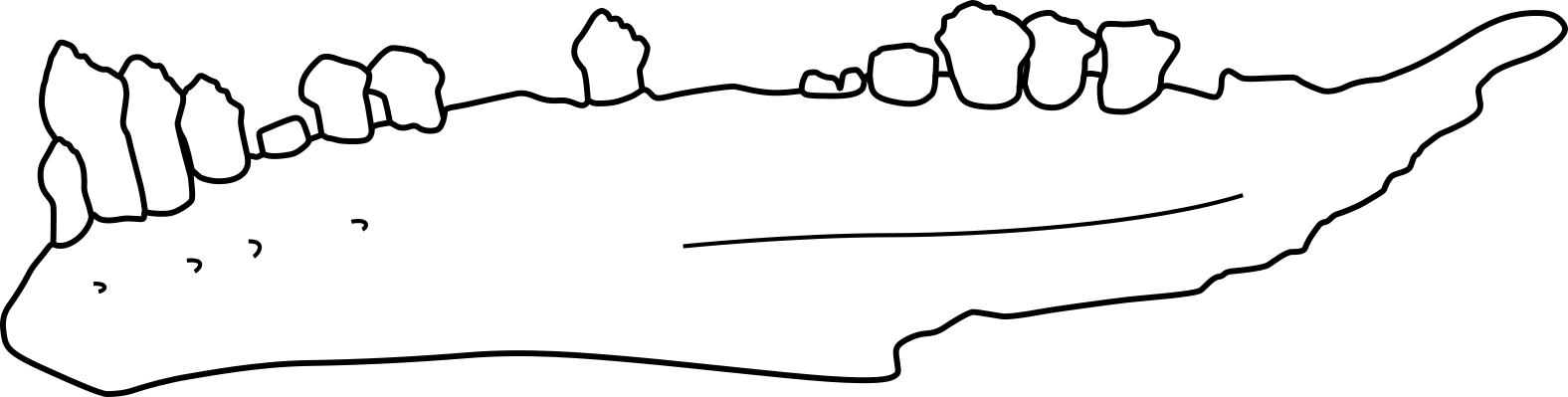
- Dentary bone of Emausaurus ernsti

Scientific classification
- Kingdom: Animalia
- Phylum: Chordata
- Class: Reptilia
- Clade: Dinosauria
- Clade: †Ornithischia
- Clade: †Genasauria
- Clade: †Thyreophora
- Genus: †Emausaurus; Haubold, 1990
- Species: †E. ernsti

Binomial name
- †Emausaurus ernsti Haubold, 1990

= Emausaurus =

Emausaurus Temporal range: Early Toarcian ~183–182 Ma Tenuicostatum

Extinct genus of thyreophoran dinosaurs

Emausaurus is a genus of thyreophoran or armored dinosaur from the Early Jurassic (Early Toarcian). Its fossils have been found in the Lehmhagen Member, in Mecklenburg-Vorpommern, northern Germany. Emausaurus is the only known Toarcian thyreophoran, as well as the only dinosaur from the zone of the same age with a formal name.

== Discovery and naming ==
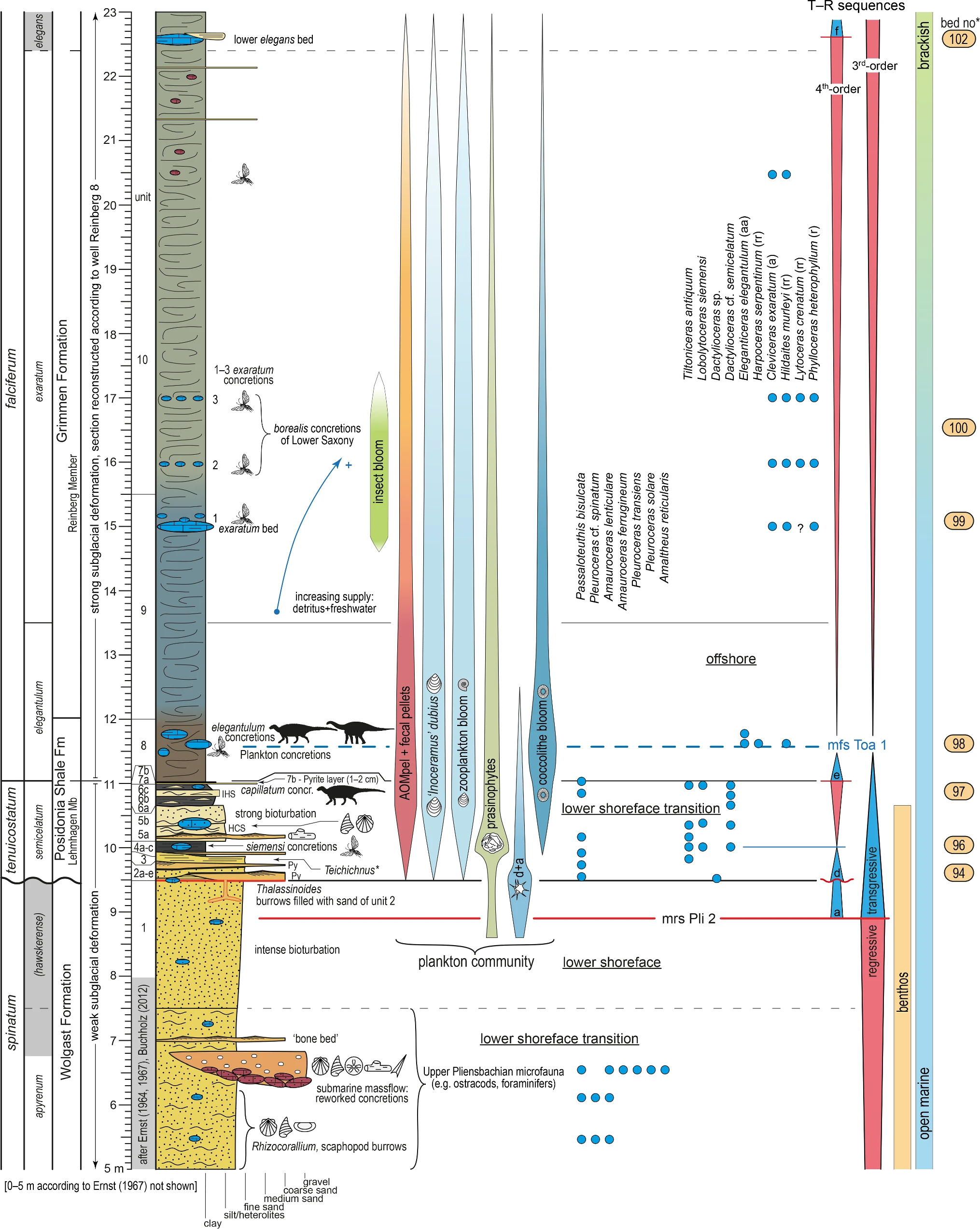
Profile at Grimmen with Emausaurus horizon marked

The type and only species, E. ernsti, was named and described by Hartmut Haubold in 1990. The generic name is composed of an acronym of Ernst Moritz Arndt University of Greifswald and the Greek sauros/σαυρος (lizard). The specific name is derived from the name of geologist Werner Ernst, who acquired the holotype specimen, SGWG 85, in the summer of 1963 from foreman Werner Wollin at a loam pit near Grimmen, in strata dating from the Toarcian. It is known by the right side of the skull, the right lower jaw, caudal vertebrae, neural arches, a radius, a metatarsal, a claw, fragments of ribs, scutes, and plates, known as EMAU SGWG 85.

== Description ==
Size compared to a human

Emausaurus was probably a semi-bipedal to quadrupedal animal, being covered in an armor of osteoderms across the body. Like other thyreophorans, it probably was an herbivore, specifically a low dwelling one, with a diet associated with ground flora, such as cycads and Bennettitales. The body length of the holotype juvenile individual of Emausaurus has been estimated at 2–2.5 m (6.6–8.2 ft), with a body mass of 50–90 kg (110–200 lb). The adult length has been estimated at 3–4 m (9.8–13.1 ft), with a body mass up to 240 kg (530 lb). Some recent data suggest the holotype may be from a subadult rather than a juvenile. Most of the reconstruction has been based on Scelidosaurus, although it is possible that Emausaurus was a more bipedal animal, as some of the young specimens of Scelidosaurus were thought to be. Adult forms probably were more quadrupedal. Unfortunately, the type specimen is too incomplete to infer a mode of locomotion. Armor includes three conical scutes and one tall, spiny element. In 2019, David Norman examined the morphology of Scelidosaurus, comparing it with Emausaurus. In Emausaurus, the maxilla has, overall, a similar morphology to that seen in Scelidosaurus. The disarticulated maxilla of Emausaurus exhibits an anteromedially directed robust process with which it met its counterpart in the midline, creating a wedge-like structure, with no obvious offset between the alveolar margins. In Emausaurus, the structure of the frontals is not well preserved. In outline, its proportions resemble those of Scelidosaurus, but the same is true of many Ornithischia. The lacrimal bone of Emausaurus is incomplete, but includes a long, curved jugal process that evidently wrapped itself around the anterior tip of the jugal. Very little is known of the postcranium Emausaurus, recovering parts like a multipartite odontoid (sutured to the axis centrum), similar to that of Scelidosaurus. Emausaurus has a series of assigned osteoderms, but lacks like Scutellosaurus 'scapular osteoderms'. The major series of osteoderms found appear to come from the tail or the dorsal section.

== Classification ==
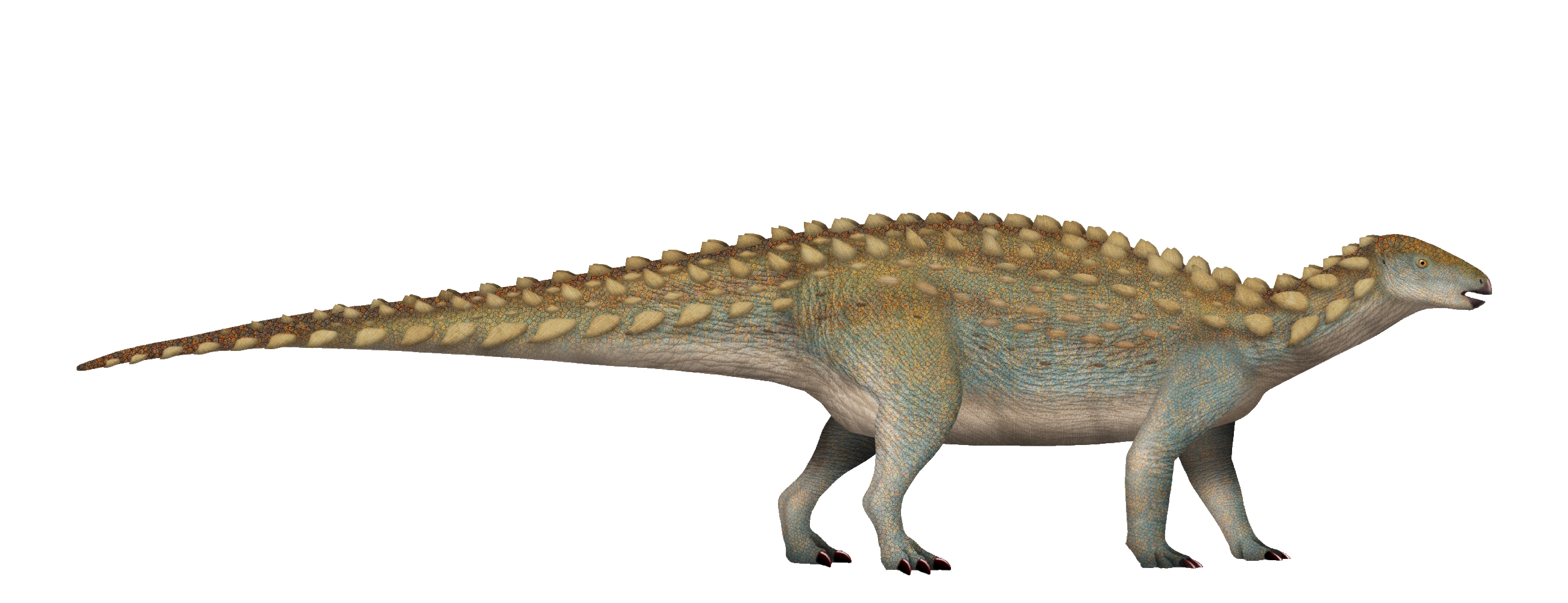
Life restoration

Cladistic analyses have shown that Emausaurus was a basal member of the Thyreophora, more derived than Scutellosaurus, but less than Scelidosaurus. Scelidosaurus, Emausaurus, and Scutellosaurus cluster at the base of most trees because they can be scored for only a restricted number of anatomical characters. The cladistic status of the specimen is relatively controversial due to its young nature. It is clearly a member of the Thyreophora, but its position may be modified if an adult specimen is found. Emausaurus may be more derived than Scelidosaurus, or even be a sister taxon to Stegosauria. The general consensus has established Emausaurus as a non-eurypodan stem thyreophoran, along with Scutellosaurus and Scelidosaurus reinforced by almost all subsequent systematic reviews of ornithischian–thyreophoran relationships. Being Emausaurus and Scutellosaurus more basal than Scelidosaurus. Emausaurus has been put on an outgroup to Ankylosauria, with Scelidosaurus and the basal stegosaur Huayangosaurus. Vickaryous et al. (2004), did the default phylogenetic analysis for ingroup ankylosaurs, due to including cranial and postcranial characters, a wide range of taxa and made no in-group relationships, although this analysis used the holotype Lesothosaurus and Huayangosaurus as outgroups, ignoring Scelidosaurus and Emausaurus. In 2020, Norman found that Scelidosaurus, along with Scutellosaurus and Emausaurus, are positioned on the stem of Ankylosauria, rather than on the stem of Thyreophora, with Emausaurus as the basal sister-taxon to Scelidosaurus. This is because Emausaurus possesses a dorsal margin of the dentary sinuous in lateral view and neither elongated nor squat proportions of metacarpal 1 'medium'. Alternatively, Emausaurus may be a basal sister-taxon to Scutellosaurus, but taking the similarities between Emausaurus and Scelidosaurus this is less likely. Yet this was contested the same year with the description of +70 specimens of Scutellosaurus, where Emausaurus was found as sister taxon of this last one and both with strong evidence for a phylogenetic placement within Thyreophora but outside of Thyreophoroidea. A cladogram following the results of Norman (2020) is shown below:

- Thyreophora
  - Stegosauria
  - Ankylosauromorpha
    - Scutellosaurus
    - - Emausaurus
      - - Scelidosaurus
        - Ankylosauria
          - Ankylosauridae
          - Nodosauridae

== Paleoecology ==
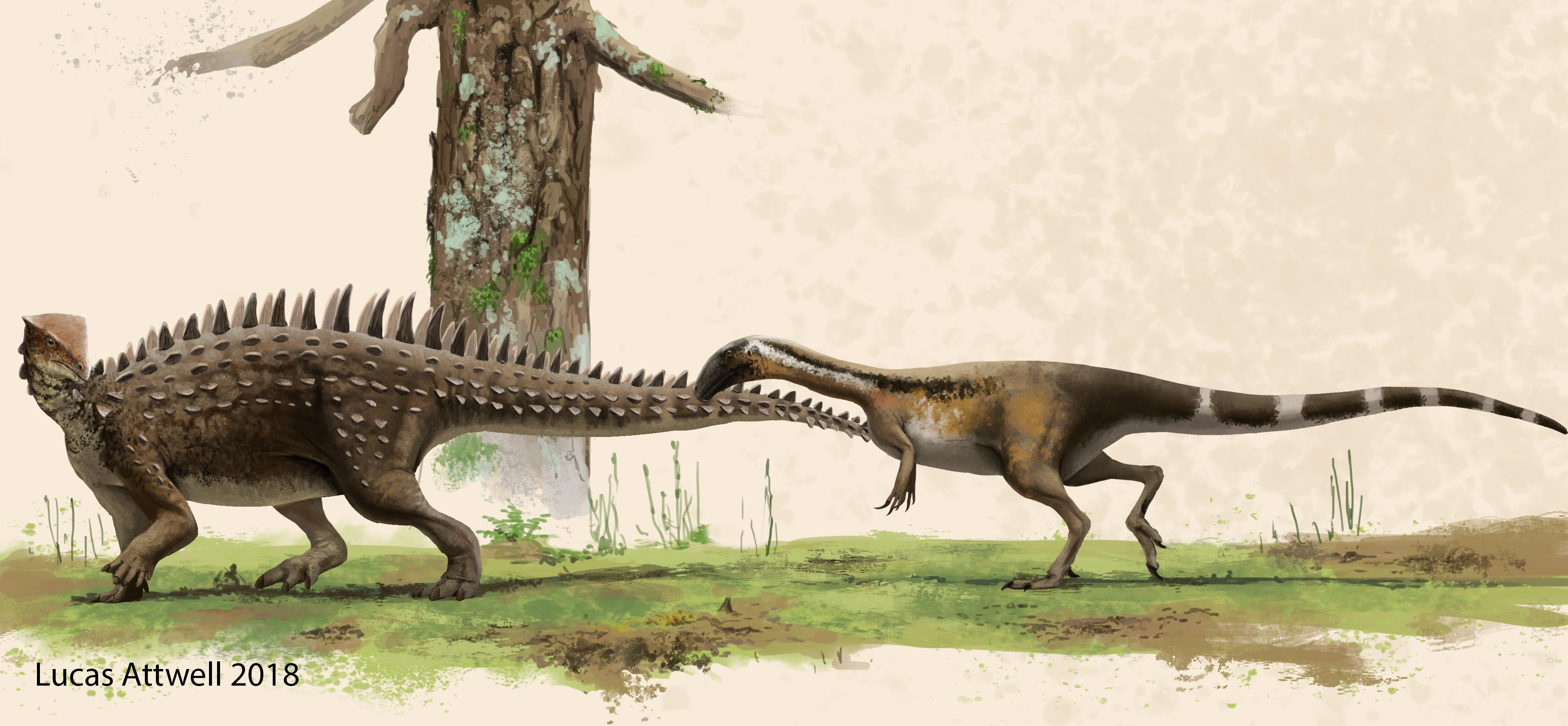
Restoration of Emausaurus being attacked by an unnamed theropod belonging to the Orionides

Emausaurus has a sinuous jaw profile, more advanced in ankylosauromorphs, unlike the rectilinear morphology seen in the more basal genus Scutellosaurus. The changes to the jaw are considered a series of modifications reflecting changes in the diet and evolution of the food processing of this dinosaur compared to its ancestors. It seems to be adapted to eat Coriaceous flora, such as bennettites and cycads, abundant on the coeval Sorthat Formation, where probably this taxon lived. The rest of the skeleton of this genus is poorly presented, with for example the vertebrae showing no evidence of the proportional changes in the height of the neural arches and spines seen on stegosaurs. The animal was covered in osteoderms, although the few found give no indication of how extensively they were distributed across the torso. Emausaurus, based on the proportions of the preserved metacarpals that the forelimb shows adaptations for weight support, rather than grasping, having ungual phalanges that are conical and only slightly decurved. The partially known proximal pedal phalanges are short and block-like, with near the same proportions seen in the pes of Scelidosaurus. A series of characters that together are suggestive of graviportality and quadrupedality, making Emausaurus a low roaming herbivore. Pseudo-bipedality is not discarded, with the animal able to reach slightly taller flora. Later works however have criticised this assumption given the relationships with Scutellosaurus are more likely and recommend to not infer bipedality or quadrupedality as the taxon is incomplete.

== Paleoenvironment ==
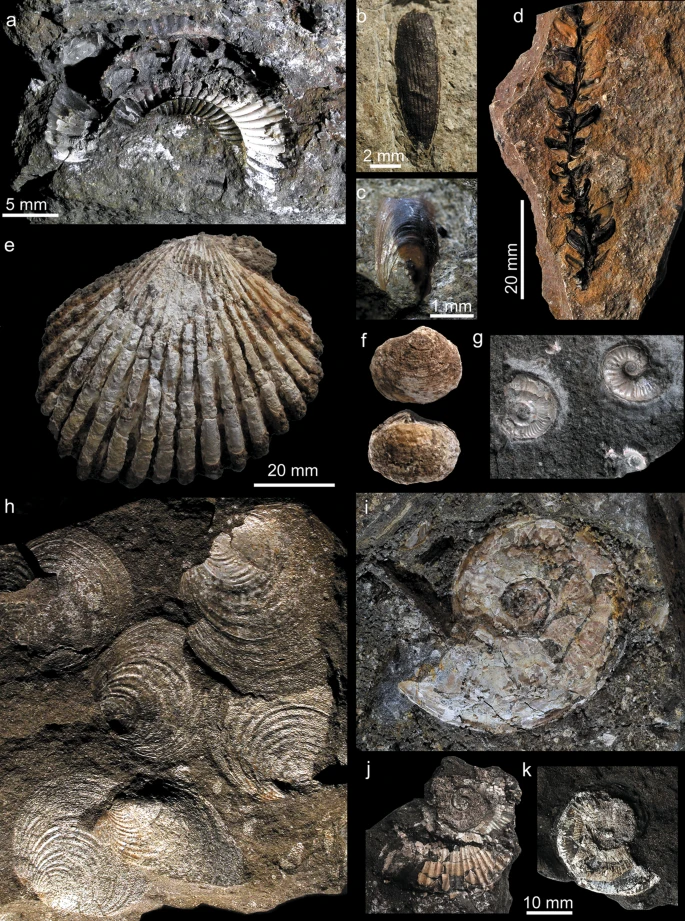
Lehmhagen Member biota

The holotype of Emausaurus was found in the so-called "Emausaurus type site", which represents a shale ingression from the Lehmhagen Member, dated from the Lower Toarcian. The site is a boundary composed of bituminous shale, representing an ancient seashore-influenced environment, probably lagoonal, and contemporaneous with the Sorthat Formation of the same region. Fossil wood has been found in the same location, including driftwood and others related to the Araucariaceae, present in other European environments of Toarcian age. The invertebrate fauna consists of insects, bivalves, sea snails and ammonites (Tiltoniceras, Eleganticeras and Lobolytoceras). The vertebrate fauna is also diverse, with fossils of the fish genera Saurorhynchus, Grimmenichthys, and Grimmenodon. Reptile fossils include indeterminate ichthyosaurs and plesiosaurs, rhomaleosaurid plesiosaurs, indeterminate mesoeucrocodylians (probably related to Sichuanosuchus), indeterminate thalattosuchians, a possible pterosaur, and theropod and gravisaurian sauropod material, the latter related to the north African Tazoudasaurus. A later discovery includes a thyreophoran osteoderm, interpreted as representing a lateral of the neck or shoulder region.
