= List of thyreophoran type specimens =

This list of specimens is a comprehensive catalogue of all the type specimens and their scientific designations for each of the genera and species that are included in the clade thyreophora.

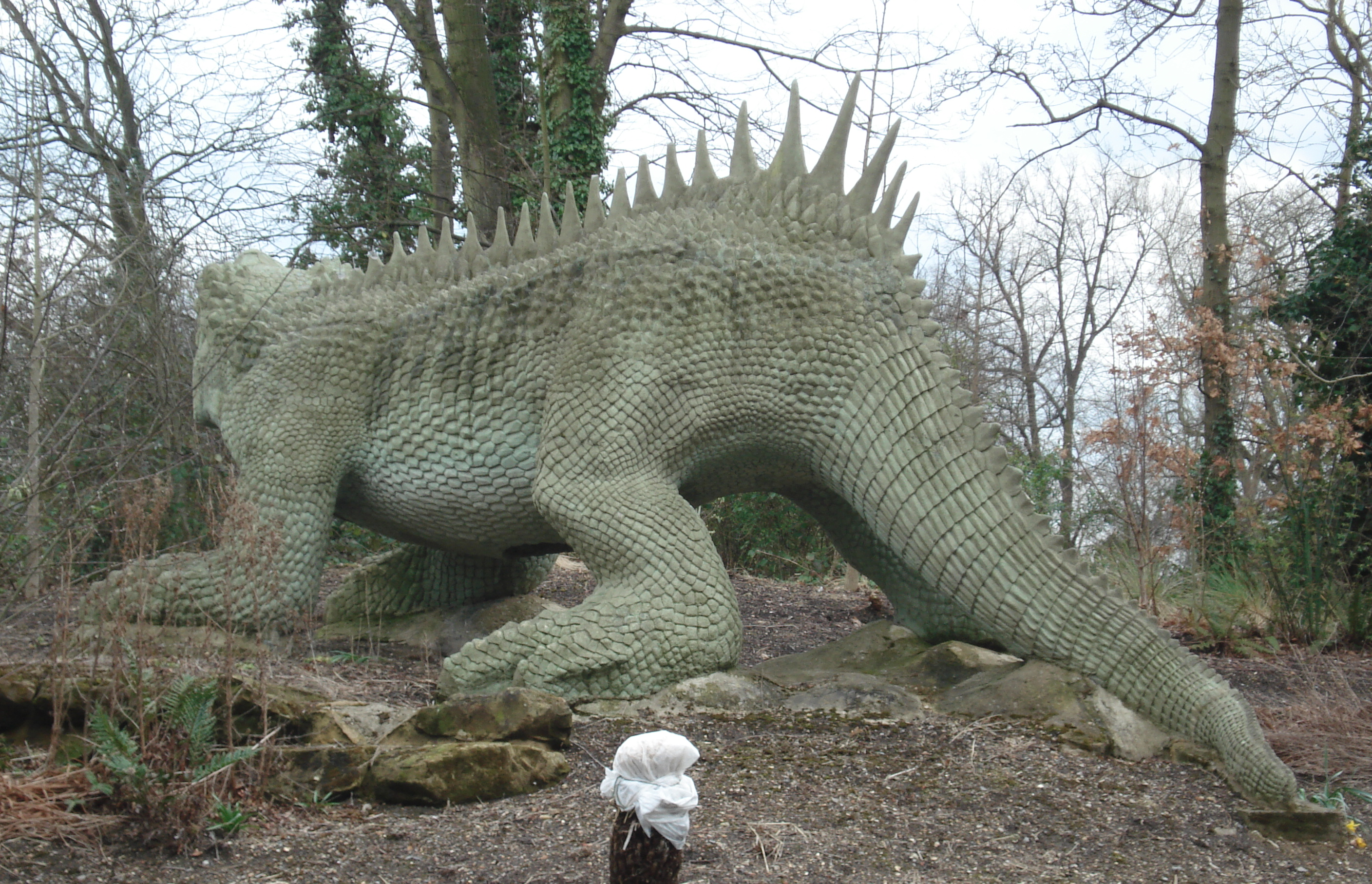
The statue of Hylaeosaurus, the first named thyreophoran, at Crystal Palace Park

Thyreophora is a clade of ornithischian dinosaurs united by, and named for, the presence ossified armor which forms parasagittal rows on the dorsal side of the animal. They were among the first dinosaurs known to science, with the genus Hylaeosaurus being one of the first genera referred to "Dinosauria" by Sir Richard Owen alongside Megalosaurus and Iguanodon in the early 19th century. However, the clade thyreophora itself was recognized in 1915 by Franz Nopcsa. It was created to include the stegosaurs, ankylosaurs, and a few other primitive armored animals like Scelidosaurus and was named after the Greek words for "shield-bearer".

This is the longest-lived individual clade of ornithischians. They first appear at the very start of the Jurassic as small, bipedal animals, similar to all other ancestral dinosaurs. However, they radiated very quickly and were the second group of herbivorous dinosaurian megafauna to evolve (after the sauropods). There was some apparent decline in their diversity with the extinction of the stegosaurids in the early Cretaceous, but this was followed by the emergence of two lineages of megafaunal ankylosaurs (nodosauridae and ankylosauridae), which both persisted to the very end of the Cretaceous. Thyreophorans were cosmopolitan in their distribution, and their remains can be found on every continent, including Antarctica.

== Scope and Terminology ==
This list will include the type fossils of each thyreophoran species. In paleontology, a type specimen is one which is definitionally a member of a biological taxon. Additional specimens can only be "referred" to these taxa if an expert deems them sufficiently similar to the type.

There is no complete, canonical list of all dinosaur taxa or holotype specimens. Attempts are regularly published in the form of books, such as the Princeton Field Guide to Dinosaurs by Gregory Paul and Dinosaurs: The Most Complete, Up-to-Date Encyclopedia for Dinosaur Lovers of All Ages by Thomas Holtz and Luis Rey. Where appropriate, The Paleobiology Database and Fossilworks, which are both online databases of named fossil taxa, are used to supplement the entries from published encyclopedias which are missing or data-deficient.

=== Type System ===
Types are also used to diagnose higher-level taxa than an individual. One individual might represent the "type specimen" of a particular species. This species would in turn represent the "type species" of a particular genus, unless it is referred to a previously described genus. Most dinosaur genera are monospecific, therefore most type specimens are also the type species of most genera. On this list, the type species of a genus is only noted when it belongs to a genus with multiple referred species, such as Stegosaurus or Tarchia. Furthermore, when an animal is different enough from its close relatives that it is given its own family, it is conventional in dinosaur systematics to name a family after the first described, most famous, or most abundant genus assigned to it. Therefore, on this list, the type species of any type genus for a family or sub-family level taxon is also noted when appropriate.

There are several different varieties of type specimen when referring to fossil animals:

- Holotype: This is the most common and simplest form of type specimen. A holotype is the first material of a fossil taxon that is described in the scientific literature. In order to qualify as a true holotype, all of the fossils of the type must belong to the same individual animal. All type specimens on this list are holotypes, unless otherwise indicated.
- Paratype(s): These are described in the same publication as the holotype. A paratype is designated when the fossil material is diagnostic enough to belong to the same species as the holotype, but it is not from the same individual animal. In these cases, the holotype and paratype(s) are collectively called the "type series" for that taxon. On this list, paratypes are noted in the same entry as their associated holotype.
- Neotype: When a holotype specimen is lost, destroyed, or otherwise unable to be studied further by scientists, a new type specimen for that taxon is required in order to identify future material. On this list, neotypes are only given their own entries when the holotype was never formally given a specimen number, otherwise they are noted in the entry for the holotype.
- Syntype(s): This is a type series in which no single specimen is selected to serve as a holotype, nor are any designated as paratypes. This is typically done if the fossil material is believed to be from multiple animals, but none of the individual animals were well-preserved enough to provide a complete list of diagnostic characters. These are also sometimes called "cotypes" in publications, although this is discouraged by the ICZN.
- Lectotype: When a single type specimen from a series of syntypes is designated as the new primary type specimen in a subsequent publication, this is considered to be a lectotype. On this list, lectotypes are given their own entries.
- Paralectotype(s): When a lectotype is designated from a series of syntypes, the remaining syntypes become paralectotypes as part of a reorganized type series. On this list, paralectotypes are noted alongside the list entry for the lectotype of their respective series.
- Plastotype: Sometimes, if a cast of a type specimen is made and the original type specimen is lost or destroyed, the cast can be used for the purposes of diagnostic referral to a taxon. Plastotypes are only given their own entries on this list if the holotype was not given a specimen number. Otherwise, they are noted alongside the entry for the holotype.
- Topotype: When a specimen is discovered from the same locality as a holotype specimen it may be given a new specimen number. If the second specimen is later determined to belong to the same animal as the holotype after the holotype has been described, it becomes a topotype.

All name-bearing type specimens (i.e. holotypes, lectotypes, neotypes, and syntypes) have unique entries on this list, and non-name-bearing types (i.e. paratypes, paralectotypes, topotypes, and holotypes that have been subsumed by a neotype) are noted alongside their name-bearing counterpart.

=== Validity ===
Some described species are later determined to be invalid by subsequent scientific publications. However, invalid species are sometimes resurrected, such as in the case of Brontosaurus, and sometimes the validity of a species can be controversial among researchers (e.g. the case of Triceratops and Torosaurus). For the purposes of neutrality and completeness, all described species and genera of thyreophorans are included, even those that have been considered invalid by subsequent scientific publications.

Naming conventions and terminology follow the International Code of Zoological Nomenclature (ICZN). Technical terms used include:

- Junior synonym: A name which describes the same taxon as a previously published name. If two or more taxa are formally designated and the type specimens are later assigned to the same taxon, the first to be published (in chronological order) is the senior synonym, and all other instances are junior synonyms. Senior synonyms are generally used, except by special decision of the ICZN, but junior synonyms cannot be used again, even if deprecated. Junior synonymy is often subjective, unless the genera described were both based on the same type specimen.
- Nomen dubium (Latin for "dubious name"): A name describing a fossil with no unique diagnostic features. This can be an extremely controversial designation, and as such, they are only notated when their supposedly dubious status has been formally published. Furthermore, if the scientific community has yet to reach a consensus on the validity of a name or taxon, the ongoing nature of the controversy will be stated.
- Nomen nudum (Latin for "naked name"): A name that has appeared in print but has not yet been formally published by the standards of the ICZN. Nomina nuda (the plural form) are invalid, and are not included on this list.
- Preoccupied name: A name that is formally published, but which has already been used for another taxon. This second use is invalid (as are all subsequent uses) and the name must be replaced.

=== Omissions ===
Some thyreophoran taxa are not included on this list. Nomina nuda are not included because a type does not become recognized by the ICZN until it is published in a scientific journal with a full description.

Some misidentified taxa are also not included so long as there is a scientific consensus with regard to the specimen in question. If a specimen is later referred to a taxon outside thyreophora, it is not included on this list. However, specimens that are identified as thyreophorans in publications subsequent to their initial description are included under the name they are given within thyreophora.

Referred taxa are only included on the list as separate entries when their initial description includes a unique type specimen (e.g. Stegosaurus duplex or Stormbergia dangershoeki).

== List of Specimens ==
- Binomial name: All animals species are given a unique binomial name, typically consisting of Latin or Greek words which are used to formally and scientifically identify each species.
- Catalogue number: In most museum collections, each fossil specimen will be given a unique catalogue number which is published with the description of the fossils after they are prepared. This serves as a formal name for every single described fossil so that authors are able to refer to individual fossil discoveries in the scientific literature by name.
- Institution: Most published fossils are stored in museum collections or at universities. This is also true of type specimens, many of which are on display in museums around the world. If a type specimen has been lost, the last known location of the type is listed.
- Age: The geological stage from which the specimen was recovered is listed, when it is known. The exact age of some geological formations is not known. If this is the case, a range of possible ages is given.
- Unit: Most fossils are recovered from named geologic formations (e.g. the Morrison Formation or the Hell Creek Formation). When this is not the case, a city or landmark near the locality from which the fossil was recovered is listed.
- Material: The vast majority of fossils do not preserve the complete skeleton of an animal. In these cases, the specific bones which are fossilized have been listed.
- Notes: Other general information, such as the validity status of the taxon in question, or any other material in the type series may be listed here.

Binomial Name	Catalogue number	Institution	Age	Unit	Material	Notes	Images
Acantholipan gonzalezi	CPC 272	Colección Paleontológica de Coahuila, Museo del Desierto	Campanian	Pen Formation, Coahuila	A few vertebrae, portions of the limb bones, a rib, and an osteoderm		
Acanthopholis horrida	GSM 109045-GSM 109058	British Geological Survey	Uncertain (Albian to Cenomanian?)	Chalk Group, England	Teeth, vertebrae, osteoderms, and the base of the skull	Two specimens were designated as cotypes	
Adratiklit boulahfa	NHMUK PV R37366	Natural History Museum, London	Bathonian	El Mers II Formation, Morocco	Single cervical vertebra	Other vertebrae from the same locality are referred to this genus, but it is uncertain if they belong to the same individual	
Ahshielepelta minor	SMP VP-1930	State Museum of Pennsylvania	Campanian	Hunter Wash Member, Kirtland Formation, New Mexico	Shoulder and fore limb bones, fragmentary vertebrae, osteoderms, and some unidentified material		Skeletal diagram
Akainacephalus johnsoni	UMNH VP 20202	Utah Museum of Natural History	Late Campanian	Kaiparowits Formation, Utah	Half-complete skeleton with most of the skull		The holotype bones (top) with a digital reconstruction of the skeleton
Alcovasaurus longispinus	UW 20503	University of Wyoming	Kimmeridgian	Morrison Formation, Wyoming	Mostly complete hips, numerous ribs and vertebrae, thagomizers, and a femur	Most of the holotype (except the femur) has been lost, the species has been previously referred to Stegosaurus, Miragaia, and Kentrosaurus	Digital reconstruction of the lost holotype material
Aletopelta coombsi	SDNHM 33909	San Diego Natural History Museum	Late Campanian	Point Loma Formation, California	Fragmentary shoulders, limbs, hips, ribs, vertebrae, and teeth		The holotype on display in situ
Animantarx ramaljonesi	CEUM 6228R	USU Eastern Prehistoric Museum	Mid-Albian to Early Cenomanian	Mussentuchit Member, Cedar Mountain Formation, Utah	Partial skull, ribs, shoulder and arm elements, hip, and a few vertebrae		
Ankylosaurus magniventris	AMNH 5895	American Museum of Natural History	Maastrichtian	Hell Creek Formation, Montana	Partial skeleton	Type species of the suborder "Ankylosauria", the family "Ankylosauridae", the subfamily "Ankylosaurinae", and the tribe "Ankylosaurini"	Cast of the holotype on display in Colorado
Anodontosaurus inceptus	TMP 1997.132.1	Royal Tyrrell Museum	Campanian	Dinosaur Park Formation, Alberta	Partial skeleton		Skull of the holotype with an accompanying diagram of the skull armor
Anodontosaurus lambei	CMN 8530	Canadian Museum of Nature	Early Maastrichtian	Horseshoe Canyon Formation, Alberta	Skull, numerous osteoderms, and other postcranial fragments	Type species of Anodontosaurus	Skull of the holotype with an accompanying diagram of the skull armor
Anoplosaurus curtonotus	SMC B55731	British Geological Survey	Late Albian	Cambridge Greensand, England	Fragments of the dentary, vertebrae, fore limbs, and feet	Has been variously considered some sort of ornithopod by different authors	Illustration of the fragments of the dentary, fore limbs, and feet elements.
Antarctopelta oliveroi	MLP 86-X-28-1	Museo de La Plata	Campanian	Santa Marta Formation, Antarctica	Lower jaw, skull fragments, partial forearm and foot, and a few vertebrae		Photos of the foot and vertebral elements of the holotype (left) compared with another ankylosaur
Baiyinosaurus baojiensis	IVPG-D021	Gansu Agricultural University	Late Bathonian	Straw-yellow Sandstone Member, Wangjiashan Formation, Gansu Province	A partial skull and nine disarticulated vertebrae		Reconstruction of the holotype specimen
Bashanosaurus primitivus	CLGPR V00006-1	Chongqing Laboratory of Geoheritage Protection and Research	Bathonian	Shaximiao Formation, Chongqing	Hindlimb and shoulder bones, ribs, back and tail vertebrae, plates, and a spine		Digital reconstruction of the three known specimens (holotype in white)
Bienosaurus lufengensis	IVPP V15311	Institute of Vertebrate Paleontology and Paleoanthropology	Sinemurian	Lower Lufeng Formation, Yunnan	Partial dentary with teeth and cranial fragments	Possibly a nomen dubium	Dentary elements of the holotype
Bissektipelta archibaldi	ZIN PH 1/6	Russian Academy of Sciences	Turonian	Bissekty Formation, Uzbekistan	Mostly complete skull with associated osteoderms		
Borealopelta markmitchelli	TMP 2011.033.0001	Royal Tyrrell Museum	Albian	Wabiskaw Member, Clearwater Formation, Alberta	Fully articulated frontal skeleton including skin impressions with the tail and hindquarters missing	Nicknamed the "Suncor Nodosaur", the specimen was so well preserved that scientists were able to identify what color the animal's skin likely was	
Brachypodosaurus gravis	IM V9	Banaras Hindu University	Maastrichtian	Lameta Formation, Madhya Pradesh	A humerus	Some authors do not consider it diagnostic enough to refer it to thyreophora or even ornithischia	
Cedarpelta bilbeyhallorum	CEUM 12360	USU Eastern Prehistoric Museum	Mid-Albian to Early Cenomanian	Mussentuchit Member, Cedar Mountain Formation, Utah	Fragmentary skull		Holotype on display with missing skull elements filled in
Chialingosaurus kuani	IVPP 2300	Institute of Vertebrate Paleontology and Paleoanthropology	Late Oxfordian or early Kimmeridgian	Upper Shaximiao Formation, Sichuan	Several vertebrae, arm bones, and spines		Humerus of the holotype
Chuanqilong chaoyangensis	CJPM V001	Institute of Vertebrate Paleontology and Paleoanthropology	Late Barremian	Jiufotang Formation, Liaoning	Nearly complete skull and skeleton with a few missing tail vertebrae	May be a junior synonym of the contemporaneous genus Liaoningosaurus	The holotype in situ accompanied by a labeled diagram
Chungkingosaurus jiangbiensis	CV 00206	Chongqing Museum of Natural History	Oxfordian	Upper Shaximiao Formation, Sichuan	Partially complete skeleton		
Craterosaurus pottonensis	SMC B.28814	Natural History Museum, London	Albian or Aptian	Woburn Sands Formation, England	Base of the cranium	May be a nomen dubium	The holotype element shown from multiple views
Crichtonpelta benxiensis	BXGMV0012	Benxi Geological Museum	Early Cenomanian	Sunjiawan Formation, Liaoning	A skull	Originally described as a species of the genus Crichtonsaurus, this species is known from much more substantial remains, so it was given a new genus	
Crichtonsaurus bohlini	IVPP V12745	Institute of Vertebrate Paleontology and Paleoanthropology	Early Cenomanian	Sunjiawan Formation, Liaoning	Partial dentary with teeth	Nomen dubium, remains are not substantial enough to diagnose it as its own genus	
Cryptosaurus eumerus	CAMSM J.46882	Sedgwick Museum of Earth Sciences	Oxfordian	Ampthill Clay, England	A femur	Nomen dubium, it is not known if the specimen belongs to a stegosaur or an ankylosaur	An illustration of the holotype
Dacentrurus armatus	NHMUK 46013	Natural History Museum, London	Kimmeridgian	Kimmeridge Clay Formation, England	Pelvis, numerous vertebrae, a femur, and a complete fore arm	Type species for the subfamily "Dacentrurinae", originally named Omosaurus before it was realized that this genus was already occupied	The holotype specimen in situ
Datai yingliangis	Holotype: YLSNHM 01002; Paratype: YLSNHM 01003	Yingliang Stone Natural History Museum	Turonian to Coniacian	Zhoutian Formation, Jiangxi	Two skulls, cervical, dorsal vertebrae, and caudal vertebrae, incomplete pectoral and pelvic girdles, left arm bones, partial right femur, ribs, and osteoderms		Type specimen block, including the holotype (bottom) and paratype (top)
Denversaurus schlessmani	DMNH 468	Denver Museum of Natural History	Maastrichtian	Lance Formation, South Dakota	Skull without lower jaw and numerous osteoderms	Sometimes considered a species of Edmontonia or possibly synonymus with E. rugosidens	The holotype on display with a reconstructed lower jaw
Diracodon laticeps	YPM 1885	Yale Peabody Museum	Tithonian	Morrison Formation, Wyoming	Partial skeleton	Nomen dubium, specimen is referred to Stegosaurus, but is not complete enough to diagnose or refer it to a particular species	
Dongyangopelta yangyanensis	DYM F0136	Dongyang Museum	Albian to Cenomanian	Chaochuan Formation, Zhejiang	Partial hip, femur, and several vertebrae		
Dracopelta zbyszewskii	MG 3	National Museum of Natural History and Science, Lisbon	Tithonian	Lourinhã Formation, Portugal	Numerous vertebrae, ribs, and osteoderms	More material from the holotype is awaiting description	
Dravidosaurus blanfordi	GSI SR Pal 1	Geological Society of India	Coniacian	Trichinopoly Group, Tamil Nadu	Partial skull	Some regard the specimen as a nomen dubium and have suggested that the specimen may represent a plesiosaur	Hypothetical skull reconstruction with known material in red
Dyoplosaurus acutosquameus	ROM 784	Royal Ontario Museum	Campanian	Dinosaur Park Formation, Alberta	Partial skull and mostly complete hindquarters with tail and most of the hind legs		Tail from the holotype
Edmontonia australis	NMMNH P-25063	New Mexico Museum of Natural History	Campanian	Kirtland Formation, New Mexico	Two osteoderms	Now considered either a nomen dubium or a junior synonym of Glyptodontopelta	
Edmontonia longiceps	NMC 8531	Canadian Museum of Nature	Early Maastrichtian	Horseshoe Canyon Formation, Alberta	Skull, partial lower jaw, and most of the postcranial skeleton including osteoderms	Type species of Edmontonia	
Edmontonia rugosidens	USNM 11868	Smithsonian Institution	Middle Campanian	Two Medicine Formation, Montana	Partial skeleton	Originally named Palaeoscincus before being referred to Edmontonia, some consider this to belong to its own genus under the name Chassternbergia or to the genus Panoplosaurus	
Emausaurus ernsti	SGWG 85	University of Greifswald	Toarcian	Ciechocinek Formation, Germany	Partial skull, multiple ribs and vertebrae, limb elements, and osteoderms		
Euoplocephalus tutus	CMN 0210	Canadian Museum of Nature	Campanian	Dinosaur Park Formation, Alberta	Partial skull and numerous osteoderms	Originally named Stereocephalus before it was discovered that that genus was already occupied, has also been referred to the nomen dubium Paleoscincus as well as to Ankylosaurus	Skull of the holotype with an accompanying diagram
Europelta carbonensis	AR-1/10	Museo Aragonés de Paleontología	Mid-Albian	Escucha Formation, Spain	Partial skull and fragmentary shoulder, limb, rib, and vertebral elements with 80 osteoderms		The skull of the holotype from multiple views
Fabrosaurus australis	MNHN LES9	Natural History Museum, Paris	Hettangian	Elliot Formation, Lesotho	Partial dentary with teeth	Generally considered a nomen dubium or a junior synonym of Lesothosaurus, has been historically considered a thyreophoran, an ornithopod, a heterodontosaur or some other ornithischian	Digital illustration of the holotype fragment
Gargoyleosaurus parkpinorum	DMNH 27726	Denver Museum of Nature and Science	Kimmeridgian	Morrison Formation, Wyoming	Skull and mostly complete postcranial skeleton		Cranial and cervical elements of the holotype
Gastonia burgei	CEUM 1307	USU Eastern Prehistoric Museum	Berriasian or Valanginian	Yellow Cat Member, Cedar Mountain Formation, Utah	Skull	Type species of Gastonia	A cast of the holotype on display in Indianapolis
Gastonia lorriemcwhinneyae	DMNH 49877	Denver Museum of Nature and Science	Late Aptian	Ruby Ranch Member, Cedar Mountain Formation, Utah	Partial skull roof		
Gigantspinosaurus sichuanensis	ZDM 0019	Zigong Dinosaur Museum	Oxfordian	Upper Shaximiao Formation, Sichuan	Dentary and mostly complete postcranial skeleton missing several ribs and the hind feet		Diagram of the holotype material with unknown elements in grey
Glyptodontopelta mimus	USNM 8610	Smithsonian Institution	Late Campanian	Ojo Alamo Formation, New Mexico	Fused osteoderms from the pelvic area		
Gobisaurus domoculus	IVPP V12563	Institute of Vertebrate Paleontology and Paleoanthropology	Turonian	Ulansuhai Formation, Inner Mongolia	Mostly complete skull		Digital reconstruction of the holotype
Heishansaurus pachycephalus	AMNH 2062	American Museum of Natural History	Campanian or Maastrichtian	Minhe Formation, Gansu	Skull fragments, several vertebrae, and osteoderms; all but a single vertebra has been lost	Nomen dubium, originally classified as a pachycephalosaur, it is now presumed to be an ankylosaur	
Hesperosaurus mjosi	HMNS 14	Hayashibara Museum of Natural Science	Early Kimmeridgian	Windy Hill Member, Morrison Formation, Wyoming	Complete pelvis, skull elements, numerous vertebrae, several ribs, and several plates		
Hoplitosaurus marshi	USNM 4752	Smithsonian Institution	Hauterivian	Lakota Formation, South Dakota	Several ribs, vertebrae, humerus and femoral fragments, and armor elements	Originally described as Stegosaurus marshi and was later referred to Polacanthus before being given its own genus	One of the armor elements of the holotype
Horshamosaurus rudgwickensis	HORSM 1988.1546	Horsham Museum	Barremian	Weald Clay, England	Fragmentary vertebrae, shoulder, ribs, and humerus with associated osteoderms	Originally named as a species of Polacanthus before being given its own genus, some consider it a nomen dubium	
Huaxiazhoulong shouwen	JPM-N000	Jiangxi Provincial Museum	Campanian	Tangbian Formation, Jiangxi Province	Most of the limbs, hips, and vertebral column with associated ribs and osteoderms		
Huayangosaurus taibaii	IVPP V6728	Institute of Vertebrate Paleontology and Paleoanthropology	Bathonian or Callovian	Dashanpu Dinosau Quarry, Shaximiao Formation, Sichuan	Skull, numerous vertebrae, a complete shoulder, and partial hips, ribs, and limb elements with several plates	Type species of the family "Huayangosauridae"	The holotype skull on display
Hungarosaurus tormai	MTM Gyn/404	Magyar Természettudományi Múzeum	Santonian	Csehbánya Formation, Hungary	Fragmentary skull and vertebrae with partial hips, shoulders, and feet		
Hylaeosaurus armatus	NHMUK 3775	Natural History Museum, London	Valanginian	Grinstead Clay Member, Tunbridge Wells Sand Formation, England	Articulated base of the skull, shoulders, armor, and vertebrae	Type species of Hylaeosaurus, the same material was used to describe H. oweni, but this "second species" is a nomen dubium	
Hypsirhophus discurus	AMNH 5731	American Museum of Natural History	Tithonian	Cope Quarry III, Morrison Formation, Colorado	Four partial vertebrae and a rib fragment	Generally considered a junior synonym of Stegosaurus	Illustration of the holotype vertebrae
Invictarx zephyri	WSC 16505	Western Science Center	Early Campanian	Menefee Formation, New Mexico	Numerous osteoderms and a partial rib		Holotype elements laid out individually
Isaberrysaura mollensis	MOZ-Pv 6459	Museo Provincial de Ciencias Naturales	Bajocian	Los Molles Formation, Patagonia	Nearly complete skull with several vertebrae, and partial rib, hip, and shoulder elements		Skull and teeth of the holotype from multiple views
Jakapil kanikura	MPCA-PV-630	Museo provincial de Cipolletti	Cenomanian	Candeleros Formation, Patagonia	Dentary with fragments of the skull, vertebrae, arm and leg bones with osteoderms	Has been suggested to be some sort of aberrant marginocephalian	A diagram of the holotype material
Jiangjunosaurus junggarensis	IVPP V 14724	Institute of Vertebrate Paleontology and Paleoanthropology	Oxfordian	Shishugou Formation, Xianjiang	Partial skull and jaw bones, several cervical vertebrae, partial ribs, and shoulder fragments		
Jinyunpelta sinensis	ZMNH M8960	Zhejiang Museum of Natural History	Albian or Cenomanian	Liangtoutang Formation, Zhejiang	Complete skull with partial skeleton missing the hind limbs		The holotype skull shown from multiple angles
Kentrosaurus aethiopicus	MB.R.4800.1-MB.R.4800.37	Natural History Museum, Berlin	Tithonian	Tendaguru Beds, Tanzania	Mostly complete vertebra with several limb bones	No holotype was designated, later authors designated multiple specimens, which are believed to belong to a single individual, as lectotypes	Mount that includes material from the lectotype
Kunbarrasaurus ieversi	QM F1801	Queensland Museum	Late Albian or Early Cenomanian	Allaru Formation, Queensland	Mostly complete skeleton with skull	Originally referred to "Minmi sp." before being given its own genus	Skull from the holotype from multiple views
Laquintasaura venezuelae	MBLUZ P.1396	University of Zulia	Hettangian	La Quinta Formation, Venezuela	A tooth	Classification of this animal remains uncertain, it may be a thyreophoran or some other type of ornithischian	
Lesothosaurus diagnosticus	NHMUK PV RU B17 and NHMUK PV RU B23 (syntypes)	Natural History Museum, London	Pliensbachian	Upper Elliot Formation, South Africa	Partial skeleton with an associated skull and another skull	Classification remains uncertain, it may be a thyreophoran, a primitive ornithopod, or some other type of ornithischian	
Lexovisaurus durobrivensis	NHMUK R1989	Natural History Museum, London	Oxfordian	Peterborough Member, Oxford Clay Formation, England	Mostly complete pelvis	Originally named Omosaurus before it was discovered that that genus was occupied and it was given its own genus, some consider it a nomen dubium	Illustration of the holotype
Liaoningosaurus paradoxus	IVPP V12560	Institute of Vertebrate Paleontology and Paleoanthropology	Late Barremian or Early Aptian	Dawangzhangzi Bed, Yixian Formation, Liaoning	Complete and fully articulated skeleton		
Loricatosaurus priscus	NHMUK R3167	Natural History Museum, London	Callovian	Oxford Clay Formation, England	Numerous vertebrae, humerus, ulna, femur, several plates, and other fragmentary limb elements	Originally assigned to Stegosaurus and then to Lexovisaurus before being given its own genus	
Lusitanosaurus liasicus	Uncatalogued	Museu de História Natural da Universidade de Lisboa	Probably Sinemurian	Exact locality uncertain, somewhere near São Pedro de Moel	Partial maxilla and dentary with associated teeth	Holotype material was destroyed in a fire	
Maleevus disparoserratus	PIN 554/I	Moscow Paleontological Museum	Uncertain (Cenomanian to Santonian?)	Bayan Shireh Formation, Mongolia	Mostly complete maxilla	Originally named as a species of Syrmosaurus before being given its own genus, some consider it a nomen dubium	
Minmi paravertebra	QM F10329	Queensland Museum	Aptian	Minmi Member, Bungil Formation, Queensland	Several back vertebrae, ribs, a complete hindlimb and numerous osteoderms		
Minotaurasaurus ramachandrani	INBR21004	Victor Valley Museum	Campanian	Uhkaa Tolgod, Djadochta Formation, Mongolia	Complete skull with dentary and predentary		Cast of the holotype skull on display
Miragaia longicollum	ML 433	Museu da Lourinhã	Late Kimmeridgian or Early Tithonian	Sobral Unit, Lourinhã Formation, Portugal	Nearly complete hindquarters with a skull	Subjective junior synonym of Dacentrurus	
Mongolostegus exspectabilis	PIN 3779-15	Moscow Paleontological Museum	Aptian or Albian	Dzunbain Formation, Mongolia	Dorsal and caudal vertebrae with a partial hip		
Monkonosaurus lawulacus	IVPP V 6975	Institute of Vertebrate Paleontology and Paleoanthropology	Uncertain (Oxfordian to Albian)	Uncertain (either Loe-ein Formation or Lura Formation of Tibet)	Pelvis, two vertebrae, and back plates	Might be a nomen dubium	
Mymoorapelta maysi	MWC 1815	Dinosaur Journey Museum	Kimmeridgian or Tithonian	Brushy Basin Member, Morrison Formation, Colorado	Partial hip bone		Holotype elements labeled
Niobrarasaurus coleii	FHSM VP-14855	Sternberg Museum of Natural History	Coniacian to Campanian	Smoky Hill Chalk Member, Niobrara Formation, Kansas	Partial skeleton	Originally named Hierosaurus before being re-described and given a new genus	
Nodocephalosaurus kirtlandensis	SMP VP-900	State Museum of Pennsylvania	Campanian	De-na-zin Member, Kirtland Formation, New Mexico	Fragmentary skull		The holotype skull (on the right)
Nodosaurus textilis	YPM VP 1815	Yale Peabody Museum	Cenomanian	Frontier Formation, Wyoming	A partial hip, li8mb elements, several vertebrae, and osteoderms	Type species of the family "Nodosauridae" and the subfamily "Nodosaurinae"	Skeletal reconstruction with unknown elements in white
Oohkotokia horneri	MOR 433	Museum of the Rockies	Late Campanian	Upper Two Medicine Formation, Montana	Skull with a humerus and a partial scapula with osteoderms	Subjective junior synonym of Scolosaurus	Skull of the holotype without the post-cranium
Panoplosaurus mirus	CMN 2759	Canadian Museum of Nature	Late Campanian	Upper Dinosaur Park Formation, Alberta	Skull with forelimb and shoulder elements and osteoderms	Type species of the tribe "Panoplosaurini"	The holotype skull on display
Paranthodon africanus	BMNH 47337	Natural History Museum, London	Berriasian to Valanginian	Kirkwood Formation, South Africa	Partial maxilla with teeth	Originally assigned to the pareiasaur genus Anthodon and later referred to the now-defunct genus Palaeoscincus before finally receiving its own genus	Holotype skull reconstructed with unknown elements in grey
Patagopelta cristata	MPCA-SM-78	Carlos Ameghino Provincial Museum	Late Campanian or Early Maastrichtian	Allen Formation, Patagonia	A few vertebrae, a femur, a tooth, and osteoderms		
Pawpawsaurus campbelli	SMU 73203	Fort Worth Museum of Science	Albian or Cenomanian	Paw Paw Formation, Texas	Complete skull without dentary		A cast of the holotype on display
Peloroplites cedrimontanus	CEUM 26331	USU Eastern Prehistoric Museum	Cenomanian	Mussentuchit Member, Cedar Mountain Formation, Utah	Partial skull		
Pinacosaurus grangeri	AMNH 6523	American Museum of Natural History	Campanian	Djadochta Formation, Mongolia	Partial skull, lower jaws, and cervical vertebrae	Type species of Pinacosaurus	Diagram of the holotype
Pinacosaurus mephistocephalus	IMM 96BM3/1	Inner Mongolia Museum	Campanian	Bayan Mandahu Formation, Inner Mongolia	Skull and partial skeleton		The holotype on display
Pinacosaurus ninghsiensis	Uncatalogued	Institute of Vertebrate Paleontology and Paleoanthropology	Campanian	Bayan Mandahu Formation, Inner Mongolia	Mostly complete skeleton	Considered a junior synonym of P. grangeri	
Platypelta coombsi	AMNH 5337	American Museum of Natural History	Campanian	Dinosaur Park Formation, Alberta	Skull with a mostly complete skeleton, lacking the hindlimbs and tail	Was originally referred to Euoplocephalus and has since been given its own genus, though some still consider it to be a junior synonym	Photo of the holotype skull with an accompanying diagram
Polacanthoides ponderosus	NHMUK 2584	Natural History Museum, London	Valanginian to Barremian	Wealden Beds, England	Partial shoulder	Nomen dubium and possibly a junior synonym of Hylaeosaurus or Polacanthus	
Polacanthus becklesi	BMNH R1926	Natural History Museum, London	Barremian?	Exact locality unknown, Wealden Group, England	Partial ilium with associated armor	Generally considered a junior synonym of P. foxii because the diagnostic characteristics are believed to be taphonomic in nature	
Polacanthus foxii	NHMUK PV R175	Natural History Museum, London	Barremian	Upper Wessex Formation, England	Numerous vertebrae, partial skull, mostly complete hindlimbs, and much of the armor	Type species of Polacanthus and of the subfamily "Polacanthinae"	The holotype laid out showing individual elements
Priconodon crassus	USNM 2135	Smithsonian Institution	Uncertain (Aptian to Turonian?)	Arundel Formation, Maryland	A tooth		An illustration of the holotype tooth
Propanoplosaurus marylandicus	USNM 540686	Smithsonian Institution	Late Aptian	Patuxent Formation, Maryland	Ribcage, vertebrae, forelimb elements, with impressions of the skull and other body parts		
Regnosaurus northamptoni	BMNH 2422	Natural History Museum, London	Valanginian	Tunbridge Wells Sand Formation, England	Fragments of the lower jaw		Illustration of the holotype elements
Rhadinosaurus alcimus	PIUW 2349/34	University of Vienna	Early Campanian	Grünbach Formation, Austria	Two fibulae and other limb fragments	Some humeral fragments originally referred to the same individual as the holotype were later referred to the genus Zalmoxes, others believe that the holotype represents a crocodyliform or a junior synonym of Struthiosaurus	
Saichania chulsanensis	GI SPS 100/151	Mongolian Academy of Sciences	Late Campanian	Barun Goyot Formation, Mongolia	Articulated skull, numerous vertebrae, a forelimb and shoulder, and much of the armor		Cast of the holotype skull
Sarcolestes leedsi	BMNH R2682	Natural History Museum, London	Oxfordian	Oxford Clay, England	Partial mandible	Originally classified as a theropod before modern re-appraisal assigned it to thyreophora, some consider it a nomen dubium	Illustration of the holotype from multiple views
Sauropelta edwardsorum	AMNH 3032	American Museum of Natural History	Late Albian	Little Sheep Member, Cloverly Formation, Montana	Partial skeleton		
Sauroplites scutiger	Uncatalogued	Specimens lost, were last at the AMNH	Albian	Upper Zhidan Group, Inner Mongolia	Ribs and osteoderms with a probably ischium	A cast of some of the original material remains under the catalogue AMNH 2074, but it has not been formally designated as a lectotype	
Scelidosaurus harrisonii	NHMUK R.1111	Natural History Museum, London	Sinemurian	Black Ven Marl Member, Charmouth Mudstone Formation, England	Mostly complete skeleton with skull and lower jaw without the fore limbs	No holotype was named, the specimen NHMUK R.1111 was designated as the lectotype	Skull drawing of the lectotype
Scolosaurus cutleri	NHMUK R.5161	Natural History Museum, London	Campanian	Lower Dinosaur Park Formation, Alberta	Mostly complete skeleton missing two limbs and the end of the tail with preserved skin impressions	Type species of Scolosaurus	The holotype shown from above
Scolosaurus thronus	ROM 1930	Royal Ontario Museum	Campanian	Dinosaur Park Formation, Alberta	Partial skeleton including the skull	Originally referred to the genus Euoplocephalus before being referred to Scolosaurus	A mount reconstructed based on the holotype at the Royal Tyrrell Museum
Scutellosaurus lawleri	MNA.V.175	Museum of Northern Arizona	Sinemurian	Kayenta Formation, New Mexico	Mostly complete vertebra and limbs with fragments of the skull, dentary, and hip		Diagram of the holotype material
Serendipaceratops arthurcclarkei	NMV P186385	Melbourne Museum	Early Aptian	Wonthaggi Formation, Victoria	Ulna	Considered a nomen dubium, originally described as a ceratopsian, remains are so fragmentary that some believe it is not possible to diagnose them as such, some have referred the holotype to ankylosauria	
Shamosaurus scutatus	PIN N 3779/2	Russian Academy of Sciences	Aptian to Albian	Dzunbain Formation, Mongolia	Skull, lower jaws and partial postcranial skeleton with armor		
Shanxia tianzhenensis	IVPP V11276	Institute of Vertebrate Paleontology and Paleoanthropology	Uncertain (Cenomanian to Campanian?)	Huiquanpu Formation, Shanxi	Partial skull, a few vertebrae, and fragments of the limb bones and hip	Sometimes considered a junior synonym of Tianzhenosaurus	
Silvisaurus condrayi	KU 10296	University of Kansas	Albian	Terracotta Clay Member, Dakota Formation, Kansas	Mostly complete skull, numerous vertebrae, and fragments of the hip, toes, and hind limb		Drawing of the holotype
Sinankylosaurus zhuchengensis	ZJZ-183	Zhucheng Dinosaur Museum	Campanian	Hongtuya Formation, Wangshi Group, Shandong	Partial hip		
Spicomellus afer	NHMUK PV R37412	Natural History Museum, London	Bathonian or Callovian	El Mers III Formation, El Mers Group, Morocco	Single rib with ossified spines		
Stegopelta landerensis	FMNH UR88	Field Museum of Natural History	Cenomanian	Belle Fourche Member, Frontier Formation, Wyoming	Several vertebrae with fragmentary skull and limb elements and associated armor		A piece of armor from the holotype
Stegosaurides excavatus	Uncatalogued	Institute of Vertebrate Paleontology and Paleoanthropology	Uncertain (Barremian or Aptian?)	Xinminbao Group, Gansu	Two vertebrae and part of a spine	Probably a nomen dubium	
Stegosaurus armatus	YPM 1850	Yale Peabody Museum	Tithonian	Brushy Basin Member, Morrison Formation, Colorado	Several caudal vertebrae and armor fragments	Original type species of Stegosaurus, it was later discovered to be a nomen dubium	
Stegosaurus duplex	YPM 1858	Yale Peabody Museum	Tithonian	Brushy Basin Member, Morrison Formation, Wyoming	Several vertebrae with a partial pelvis and hind limb	Generally considered a junior synonym of S. ungulatus	
Stegosaurus madagascarensis	Uncatalogued	Specimen lost, was last at the National Museum of Natural History, France	Maastrichtian	Maevarano Formation, Madagascar	Several teeth	Widely considered a nomen dubium, some consider it to be an indeterminate ankylosaur	
Stegosaurus stenops	USNM 4934	Smithsonian Institution	Kimmeridgian	Brushy Basin Member, Morrison Formation, Colorado	Mostly complete skeleton	Specimen is nicknamed "Roadkill", was designated the new type species of Stegosaurus after S. armatus was found to be a nomen dubium	The holotype on display as it was found
Stegosaurus sulcatus	USNM V 4937	Smithsonian Institution	Kimmeridgian	Lake Como Member, Morrison Formation, Wyoming	Thagomizer		
Stegosaurus ungulatus	YPM 1853	Yale Peabody Museum	Kimmeridgian	Brushy Basin Member, Morrison Formation, Wyoming	Half of a skeleton with a partial skull		The mounted holotype on display in the 19th century with missing elements filled in
Stegouros elengassen	CPAP-3165	Instituto Antártico Chileno	Maastrichtian	Dorotea Formation, Chile	Mostly complete skeleton		Diagram of the holotype material
Stormbergia dangershoeki	SAM-PK-K1105	Iziko South African Museum	Hettangian or Sinemurian	Upper Elliot Formation, South Africa	Partial postcranial skeleton	Generally considered a junior synonym of Lesothosaurus diagnosticus	
Struthiosaurus austriacus	PIWU 2349/6	Natural History Museum, Vienna	Campanian	Grünbach Formation, Austria	Skull with associated osteoderms	Type species of Struthiosaurus	A diagram showing all known material of S. austriacus including the holotype material
Struthiosaurus languedocensis	UM2 OLV-D50 A–G CV	University of Montpellier	Early Campanian	Unnamed Formation, France	Complete pelvis with numerous vertebrae		
Struthiosaurus transylvanicus	BMNH R4966	Natural History Museum, London	Early Maastrichtian	Sânpetru Formation, Romania	Partial skeleton		
Syrmosaurus viminosaudus	PIN 614	Russian Academy of Sciences	Campanian	Djadochta Formation, Mongolia	Nearly complete skeleton lacking a skull	Generally considered a junior synonym of Pinacosaurus grangeri	
Talarurus plicatospineus	PIN 557-91	Moscow Paleontological Museum	Uncertain (Cenomanian to Santonian?)	Bayan Shireh Formation, Mongolia	Partial skull and mostly complete axial skeleton with fragmentary limb elements		The holotype and other referred specimens combined into a display mount
Taohelong jinchengensis	GSDM 00021	Gansu Dinosaur Museum	Uncertain (Valanginian to Albian?)	Hekou Group, Gansu	Tail vertebrae, ribs, a partial hip and some osteoderms		
Tarchia kielanae	ZPal MgD-I/111	Mongolian Academy of Sciences	Late Campanian	Barun Goyot Formation, Mongolia	Partial skull	Type species of Tarchia	The holotype skull shown from multiple views with associated diagrams
Tarchia teresae	PIN 3142/250	Russian Academy of Sciences	Maastrichtian	Hermiin Tsav, Nemegt Formation, Mongolia	A complete skull		A cast of the holotype skull on display
Tarchia tumanovae	MPC-D 100/1353	Mongolian Academy of Sciences	Maastrichtian	Hermiin Tsav, Nemegt Formation, Mongolia	Partial skeleton		A diagram of the holotype (a and b) with a hypothetical complete skeleton (c)
Tatankacephalus cooneyorum	MOR 1073	Museum of the Rockies	Albian	Himes Member, Cloverly Formation, Montana	Partial skull		
Tatisaurus oehleri	FMNH CUP 2088	Field Museum of Natural History	Sinemurian	Zhangjiawa Beds, Lufeng Formation, Yunnan	Partial lower jaw	Originally classified as a species of Scelidosaurus before being given its own genus, some believe it is a nomen dubium	Illustration of the holotype
Texasetes pleurohalio	USNM 337987	Smithsonian Institution	Albian	Paw Paw Formation, Texas	Fragments of a skull, shoulders, hips, limb bones, and vertebrae		Limb fragments belonging to the holotype
Thyreosaurus atlasicus	HIIUC-BN00	Hassan II University of Casablanca	Uncertain (Bathonian to Callovian)	El Mers III Formation, El Mers Group, Morocco	Several vertebrae, ribs, a limb bone, and osteoderms		Holotype material with a speculative silhouette
Tianchisaurus nedegoapeferima	IVPP V. 10614	Institute of Vertebrate Paleontology and Paleoanthropology	Oxfordian	Toutunhe Formation, Xinjiang	Numerous vertebrae, skull fragments, limb fragments, and some unidentifiable material	Sometimes informally called "Jurassosaurus" because its description closely followed the release of Jurassic Park	
Tianzhenosaurus chengi	Holotype: HBV-10004 Paratype: HBV-10005	Hebei GEO University	Cenomanian	Huiquanpu Formation, Shanxi	Holotype: a skull Paratype: a mostly complete postcranial skeleton		
Tianzhenosaurus youngi	HBV-10001	Hebei GEO University	Cenomanian	Huiquanpu Formation, Shanxi	Partial skull	Sometimes considered a junior synonym of Saichania, but others believe it is a valid genus	The holotype on display
Tsagantegia longicranialis	MPC 700/17	Mongolian Academy of Sciences	Uncertain (Cenomanian to Santonian?)	Bayan Shireh Formation, Mongolia	Skull without jawbones		A reconstruction of the holotype with capitegulae labeled
Tuojiangosaurus multispinus	CV 209	Chongqing Museum of Natural History	Bathonian or Callovian	Upper Shaximiao Formation, Sichuan	Mostly complete skeleton lacking skull, limb, and tail elements		
Vectipelta barretti	IWCMS 1996.153 and IWCMS 2021.75	Dinosaur Isle	Barremian	Wessex Formation, England	Numerous vertebrae, a partial hip, and partial shoulder	Previously nicknamed the "Spearpoint Ankylosaur" in scientific literature	
Wuerhosaurus homheni	IVPP V.4006	Institute of Vertebrate Paleontology and Paleoanthropology	Aptian or Albian	Lianmuqin Formation, Tulugu Group, Xinjiang	Fragmentary skeleton without a skull	Type species of Wuerhosaurus; sometimes considered to be a species of Stegosaurus	One of the back plates of the holotype on display
Wuerhosaurus ordosensis	IVPP V.6877	Lost, was last at the IVPP	Aptian or Albian	Ejinhoro Formation, Inner Mongolia	Numerous vertebrae with articulated ribs and a partial hip	Some consider it a nomen dubium due to the lack of available material	
Yanbeilong ultimus	SXMG V 00006	Shanxi Museum of Geology	Albian	Zuoyun Formation, Shanxi	Sacrum, ilia, left ischium, right pubis, dorsal vertebrae, and a caudal vertebrae	One of the youngest known stegosaurs	Reconstruction of the holotype specimen
Yingshanosaurus jichuanensis	CV00722	Chongqing Museum of Natural History	Bathonian	Upper Shaximiao Formation, Sichuan	Dorsal, sacral, and caudal vertebrae, pectoral and pelvic girdles, partial left forelimb and hindlimb, and several osteoderms		Diagram of the holotype material with unknown elements in grey
Yuxisaurus kopchicki	CVEB 21701	Yunnan University	Pliensbachian	Fengjiahe Formation, Yunnan	Several vertebrae, skull fragments, and partial fore limbs		Diagram of the holotype with known elements in blue
Zaraapelta nomadis	MPC D-100/1388	Mongolian Academy of Sciences	Late Campanian	Barun Goyot Formation, Mongolia	Skull without jawbone and part of the maxilla		
Zhongyuansaurus luoyangensis	HGM 41HIII-0002	Henan Geological Museum	Aptian	Haoling Formation, Henan	Mostly complete skull, several vertebrae, complete hips, several ribs, limb bones, and osteoderms		The holotype skull on display
Ziapelta sanjuanensis	NMMNH P-64484	New Mexico Museum of Natural History	Campanian	De-na-zin Member, Kirtland Formation, New Mexico	Mostly complete skull, three vertebrae, and associated osteoderms		The holotype skull shown from multiple views
Zuul crurivastator	ROM 75860	Royal Ontario Museum	Campanian	Middle Coal Ridge Member, Judith River Formation, Montana	Mostly complete, fully articulated skeleton	Specimen is nicknamed "Sherman", originally referred to the genus Euoplocephalus before being given its own genus	The well-preserved tail associated with the holotype

== See also ==
- List of ornithopod type specimens
- List of non-avian theropod type specimens
- List of marginocephalian type specimens
- List of other ornithischian type specimens
- List of sauropodomorph type specimens
- List of Mesozoic birds
