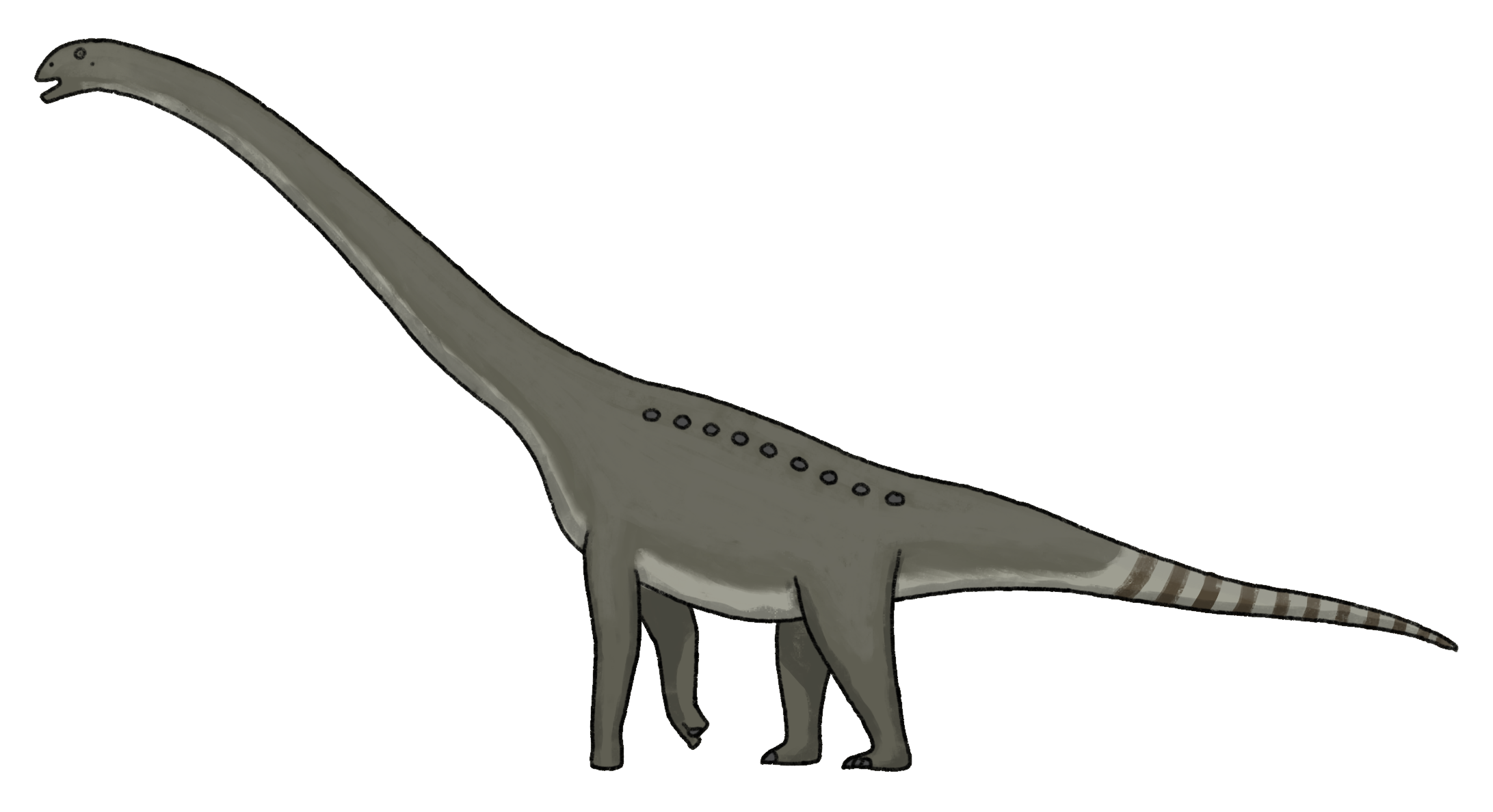
- Restoration of Borealosaurus

Scientific classification
- Domain: Eukaryota
- Kingdom: Animalia
- Phylum: Chordata
- Clade: Dinosauria
- Clade: Saurischia
- Clade: †Sauropodomorpha
- Clade: †Sauropoda
- Clade: †Macronaria
- Clade: †Titanosauria
- Genus: †Borealosaurus
- Species: †B. wimani

Binomial name
- †Borealosaurus wimani You et al., 2004

= Borealosaurus =

Borealosaurus Temporal range: Late Cretaceous, 95–90 Ma

Genus of dinosaurs

Borealosaurus is a genus of titanosaurian sauropod dinosaur from the Late Cretaceous of northern China. The type species is Borealosaurus wimani, which was named in 2004.

== Description ==
The type and only species is Borealosaurus wimani, based on fragmentary remains from the Sunjiawan Formation of Liaoning. The morphology of a mid-distal caudal vertebra was considered suggestive of a relationship with the Mongolian titanosaur Opisthocoelicaudia. However, in their overview of Cretaceous sauropod remains from Central Asia, Averianov and Sues considered Borealosaurus a non-lithostrotian titanosaur due to the lack of procoely in the middle caudal vertebrae.

It was described by Hailu, Qiang, Lamanna, Jinglu and Yinxiang, in 2004. It was named from Greek Βορεας (the North wind) and σαυρος (lizard), with its specific name being given in honor of Swedish paleontologist Carl Wiman, who named the first Chinese dinosaur.
