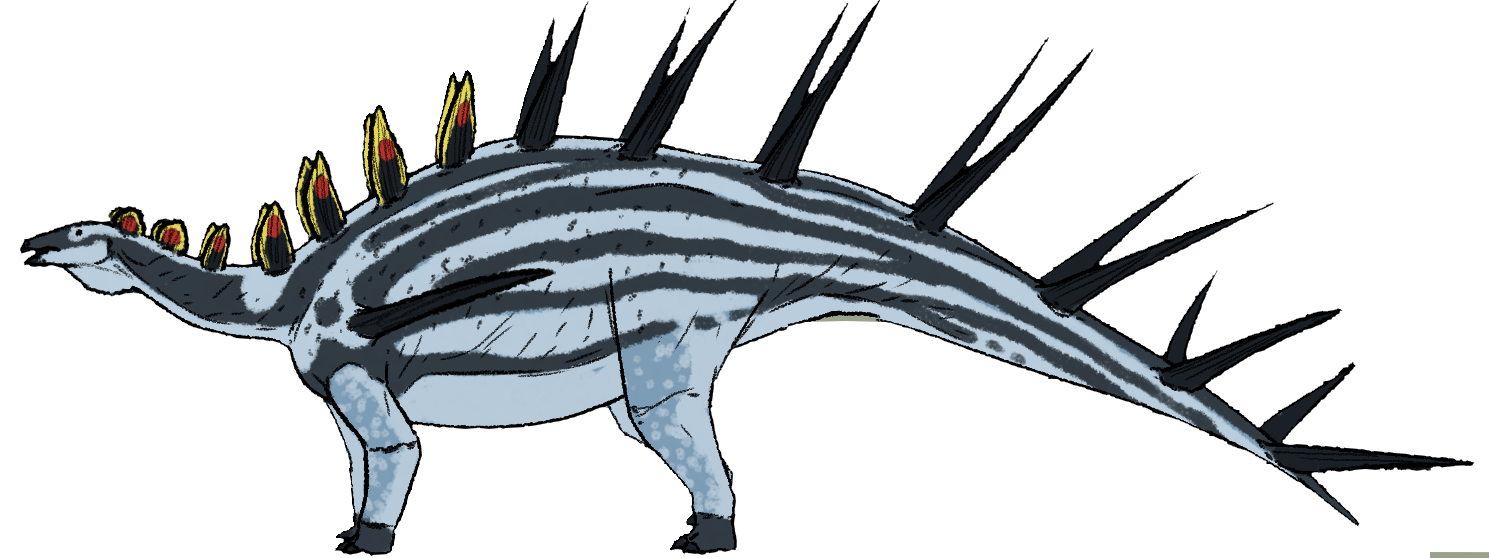
- Life restoration

Scientific classification
- Kingdom: Animalia
- Phylum: Chordata
- Class: Reptilia
- Clade: Dinosauria
- Clade: †Ornithischia
- Clade: †Thyreophora
- Clade: †Stegosauria
- Family: †Stegosauridae
- Subfamily: †Stegosaurinae
- Genus: †Chialingosaurus; Young, 1959
- Species: †C. kuani

Binomial name
- †Chialingosaurus kuani Young, 1959

= Chialingosaurus =

Chialingosaurus Temporal range: Middle Jurassic, ~latest Bathonian–early Callovian

Extinct genus of dinosaurs

Chialingosaurus (meaning "Chialing Lizard") is a dubious genus of stegosaurian dinosaur from the Middle Jurassic period of China. It is known from a single, fragmentary specimen lacking the skull. This specimen was collected in 1957 by a field party led by Chinese geologist Kuan Yaowu near the Chialing River in Qu County, southern China. The fossils come from sedimentary rocks of the upper Shaximiao Formation, which dates to between the latest Bathonian–early Callovian ages. The specimen was described in 1959, and made the basis of the new genus and species Chialingosaurus kuani. The genus name translates to "Chialing lizard" in reference to the Chialing River, while the specific name honors Kuan Yaowu. While later studies assigned many more remains to C. kuani, the holotype bears no distinguishing features. It is now considered a nomen dubium (dubious species).

This dinosaur has been classified as a basal (ancestral) stegosaurian, a group of medium and large-sized, armored dinosaurs that lived during the Jurassic and Early Cretaceous periods on every continent except Antarctica and Australia. Its length has been estimated at 4 metres (13 ft). Chialingosaurus was relatively small and slender for a stegosaurian. Its back vertebrae have tall, continuous neural spines (extensions of bone from the top of the vertebrae). In contrast to those of its relatives Stegosaurus and Kentrosaurus, Chialingosaurus' humeri (upper arm bones) are elongated and lightly-built. Some osteoderms (bony structures in skin) were found, which are elongated and spike-like. The Shaximiao Formation has yielded abundant fossils of diverse dinosaurs, including other stegosaurs and many sauropods, theropods, and early ornithischians, in addition to turtles, crocodyliforms, mammal relatives, and fish. These fossils were deposited in a semi-arid to semi-humid environment with meandering rivers.

== Discovery and validity ==
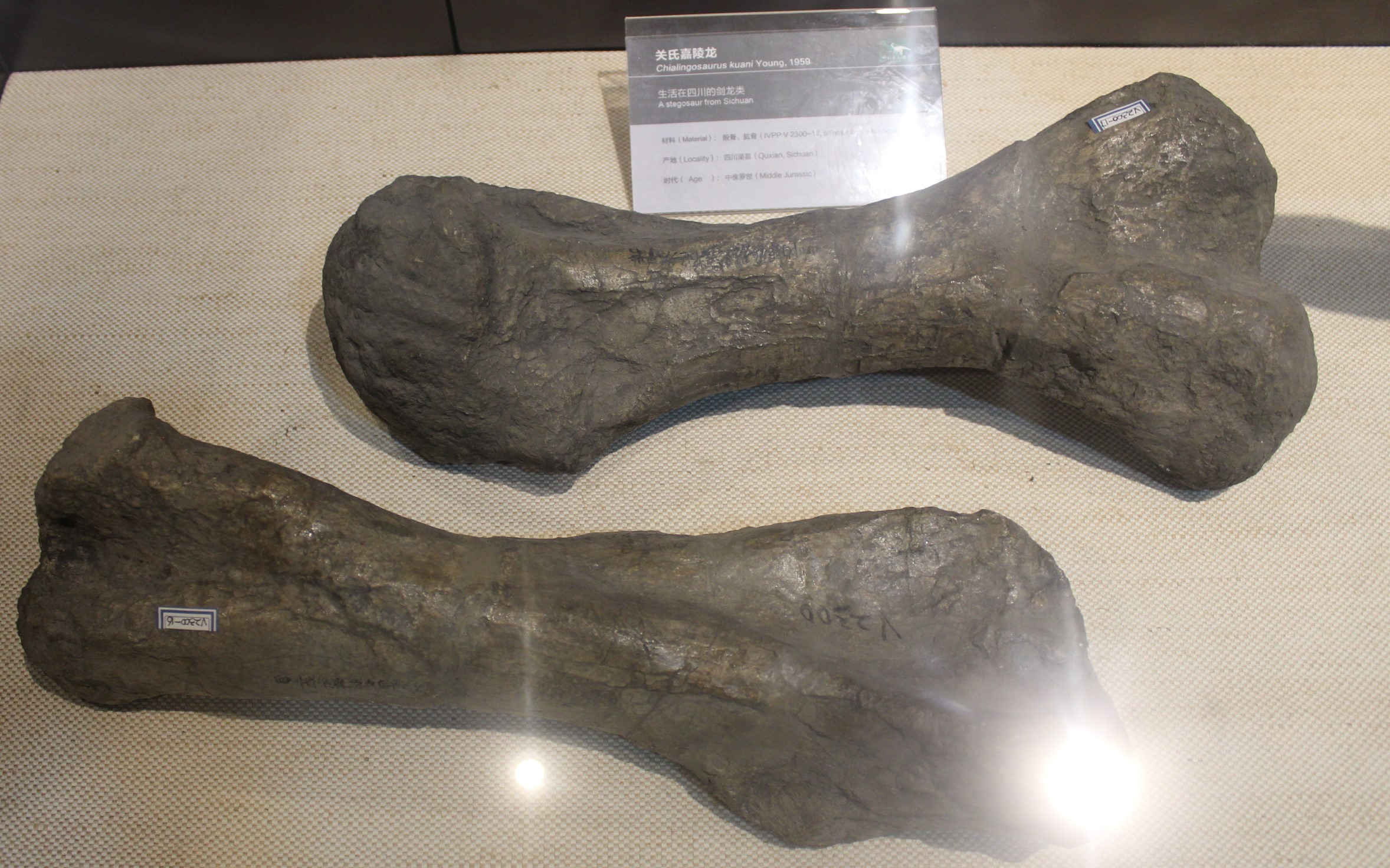
Femur and humerus (IVPP V2300-17), Paleozoological Museum of China

Fossils of Chialingosaurus were first discovered in 1957 by a geological survey of the Bureau of Petroleum field party that was headed by Chinese geologist Kuan Yaowu, also spelt Guan Yao-Wu, at Taipingstai in Qu County (Quxian), near the Chialing River in southern China. These fossils come from sedimentary rocks belonging to the lower section of the Middle Jurassic-aged upper Shaximiao Formation. This was the first discovery of stegosaur remains in China. In 1959, Chinese paleontologist Yang Zhongjian, also known as "C. C. Young", scientifically described the fossils as a new genus and species of stegosaurian dinosaur, Chialingosaurus kuani. The generic name Chialingosaurus is a combination of Chialing, in reference to the Chialing River, and the Greek root σαῦρος, sauros, meaning 'lizard'. The specific name honors Kuan, the discoverer.

The remains were deposited at the Institute of Vertebrate Paleontology and Paleoanthropology in Beijing under specimen number IVPP 2300, and consisted of six fragmentary vertebrae (backbones), three dermal spines, two partial coracoids (breastbones), a partial scapula (shoulder blade), two humeri (upper arm bones), a radius (lower arm bone), partial right ischium, a femur (thigh bone) and the third metatarsal of the hind foot. IVPP 2300 is the holotype (name-bearing) specimen of C. kuani. Additionally, a 1983 paper on Szhechuanese dinosaurs by Chinese paleontologists Dong Zhiming, Shiwu Zhou, and Yihong Zhang mentioned the presence of phalanges (finger bones) in IVPP 2300 as well. However, only a dermal spine, two humeri and a femur could be located while the rest of the fossils are missing. In his 1959 description of Chialingosaurus, Young stated it was an intermediate between the basal thyreophoran Scelidosaurus and the more advanced stegosaurine stegosaurid Stegosaurus. He classified it as the closest relative to Kentrosaurus. Although, a 1969 article American researcher Rodney Steel argued that Chialingosaurus might have actually been an early ancestor of other stegosaurs. However, Chialingosaurus has never been included in a published phylogenetic analysis due to its fragmentary nature.

=== Assigned specimens and validity ===
In November 1978, Quxian local Angui Wong reported the discovery of additional stegosaur material from an outcrop of the upper Shaximiao Formation near where the holotype was collected. In response, Shiwu Zhou from the Chongqing Natural History Museum, Xingyao Li from the Quxian County Cultural Office, and Shengquan Xu of the Hydroelectric Office found a menagerie of stegosaur fossils. This included an incomplete skeleton consisting of a partial skull, three cervical (neck), four dorsal (back) and four caudal vertebrae, an ulna, a radius, a tibia (shin bone), a fibula, an astragalus and calcaneum (ankle bones), and a partial humerus, though it was originally thought to be a scapula, which was cataloged at the Chongqing Natural History Museum under specimen number CV 202. This specimen assigned by Dong, Shiwu, and Yihong in 1983 to the same individual as the holotype, though a 2006 paper by British researcher Susannah Maidment and Chinese researcher Guangbiao Wei concluded that this is unlikely as three Chialingosaurus humeri were found in the quarry. Dong, Shiwu, and Yihong (1983) chose the specimen CV 203, a partial skeleton consisting of two cervical vertebrae, six dorsal vertebrae, five caudal vertebrae, a partial ilium and a left femur, as the paratype. All specimens are juvenile or subadult. In 1999, Chinese researchers Li Kui, Zhang Yuguang and Cai Kaiji mentioned a second species: Chialingosaurus guangyuanensis. A description was not provided, however, and the name is seen as a nomen nudum.

In 1990, British paleontologist Peter Malcolm Galton identified just a single autapomorphy (distinguishing feature) in the holotype of Chialingosaurus. Maidment and Wei (2006) went further, concluding that the remaining elements of the holotype lacked any diagnostic characteristics. This means that Chialingosaurus kuani would be a nomen dubium (dubious species) and unrecognizable beyond Stegosauria indet., a conclusion shared by other studies.

== Description ==
Overall, the skeleton is lightly built compared to that of other stegosaurs like Stegosaurus. Chialingosaurus holotype individual, a juvenile, is relatively small, measuring only 4 metres (13 ft) in length and weighing as much as a grizzly bear.

Chialingosaurus' cervical and dorsal vertebrae are amphicoelus (concave at both ends of the centra) and elongated, while its caudals are amphiplatyan (flat at both ends of the centra). The dorsal and caudal vertebrae feature moderately tall neural spines (extensions of bone from the top of the vertebrae) that stay a consistent width throughout the spinal column. Unlike Stegosaurus and Wuerhosaurus, these neural spines lack any expansion at their tops. Below the neural spines are large and circular neural canals (openings that the neural chord ran through). On the lateral sides of the caudals are transverse processes (growths of bone), which point outward in Chialingosaurus and relatives like Dacentrurus and Kentrosaurus but angle out and downward in Chungkingosaurus and Stegosaurus. The scapula is elongated with a faint ridge on its outer face and a transversely expanded top end. Compared to those of Stegosaurus and Kentrosaurus, Chialingosaurus' humeri are long; the ratio of femur length/humerus length is 1.62 in Chialingosaurus while it is 2-2.3 in Stegosaurus. The proximal (top) width of the ulna divided by the shaft length is greater than 4.0, indicating that Chialingosaurus' ulna was relatively robust compared to that of Huayangosaurus and Lexovisaurus. While Young believed that the lack of a fourth trochanter (a bony ridge) on the femur was a diagnostic trait (a characteristic that distinguishes one species from another) of Chialingosaurus, but this is likely an ontogenetic characteristic instead. Its dorsal plates are small and more spike-shaped than those of some other stegosaurs.

== Paleoecology ==
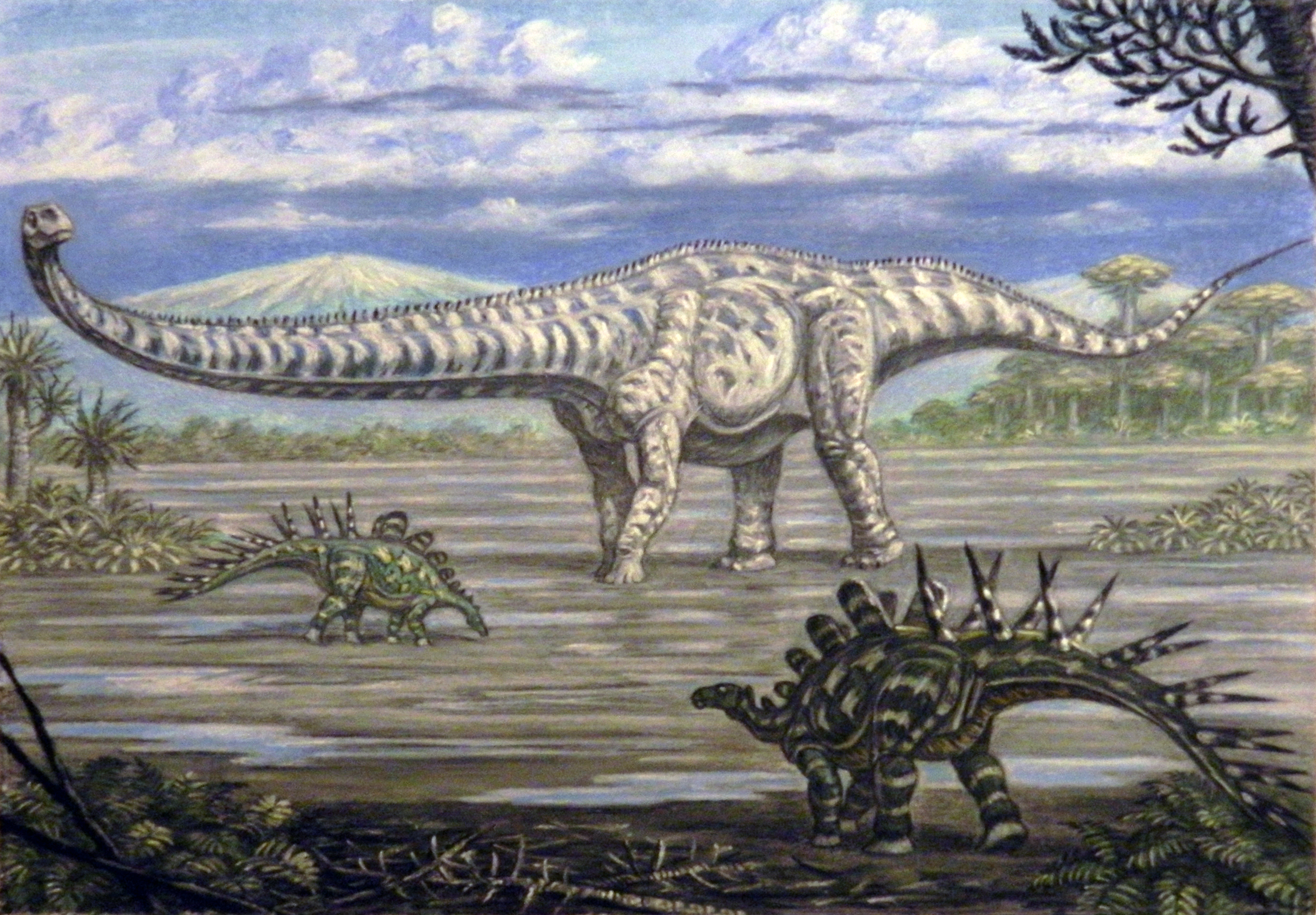
Life restoration of Mamenchisaurus (background) and Chialingosaurus

=== Age and palaeoenvironment ===
Chialingosaurus is known from the uppermost part of the Upper Member of the Shaximiao Formation. Analyses of the sedimentology and elemental geochemistry of this formation indicate that the depositional environment was semi-arid to semi-humid, with meandering rivers and a complex seasonal lake system. During the wet, flooding season, the lake level was high, surrounded by a small alluvial plain. During the drier season, small ephemeral lakes were scattered throughout a much larger alluvial plain.

The age of the rock layers of the Upper Shaximiao Formation has been debated, with estimates in 2011 proposing a Bajocian–Bathonian age range in the Middle Jurassic epoch. Subsequent research determined that the older Lower Member could be reliably dated to the Bathonian (166 ± 1.5 Ma), setting this as the oldest possible age for the Upper Member. In 2026, zircon U–Pb ages of 164.4 ± 1.7 Ma and 163.7 ± 0.9 Ma were obtained from a dinosaur-bearing locality of the upper Shaximiao Formation, suggesting that at least that region can be placed within the latest Bathonian to early Callovian.

=== Contemporary fauna ===
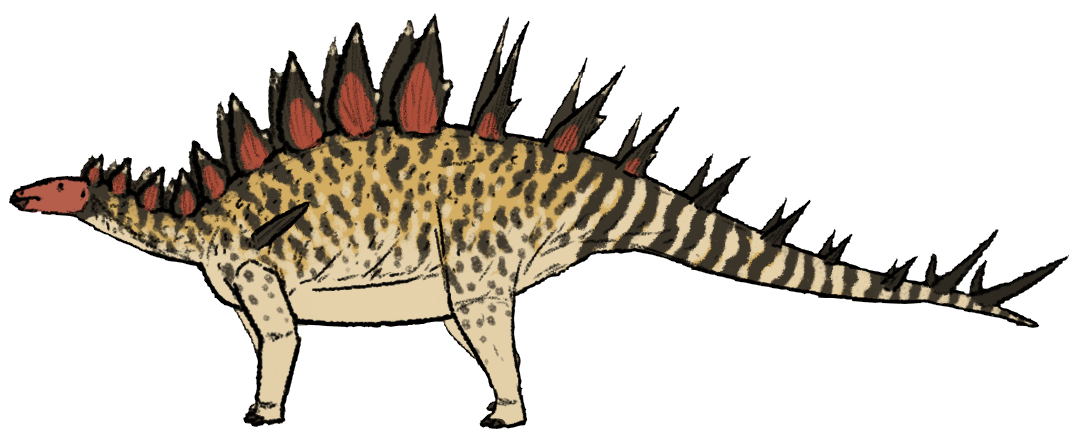
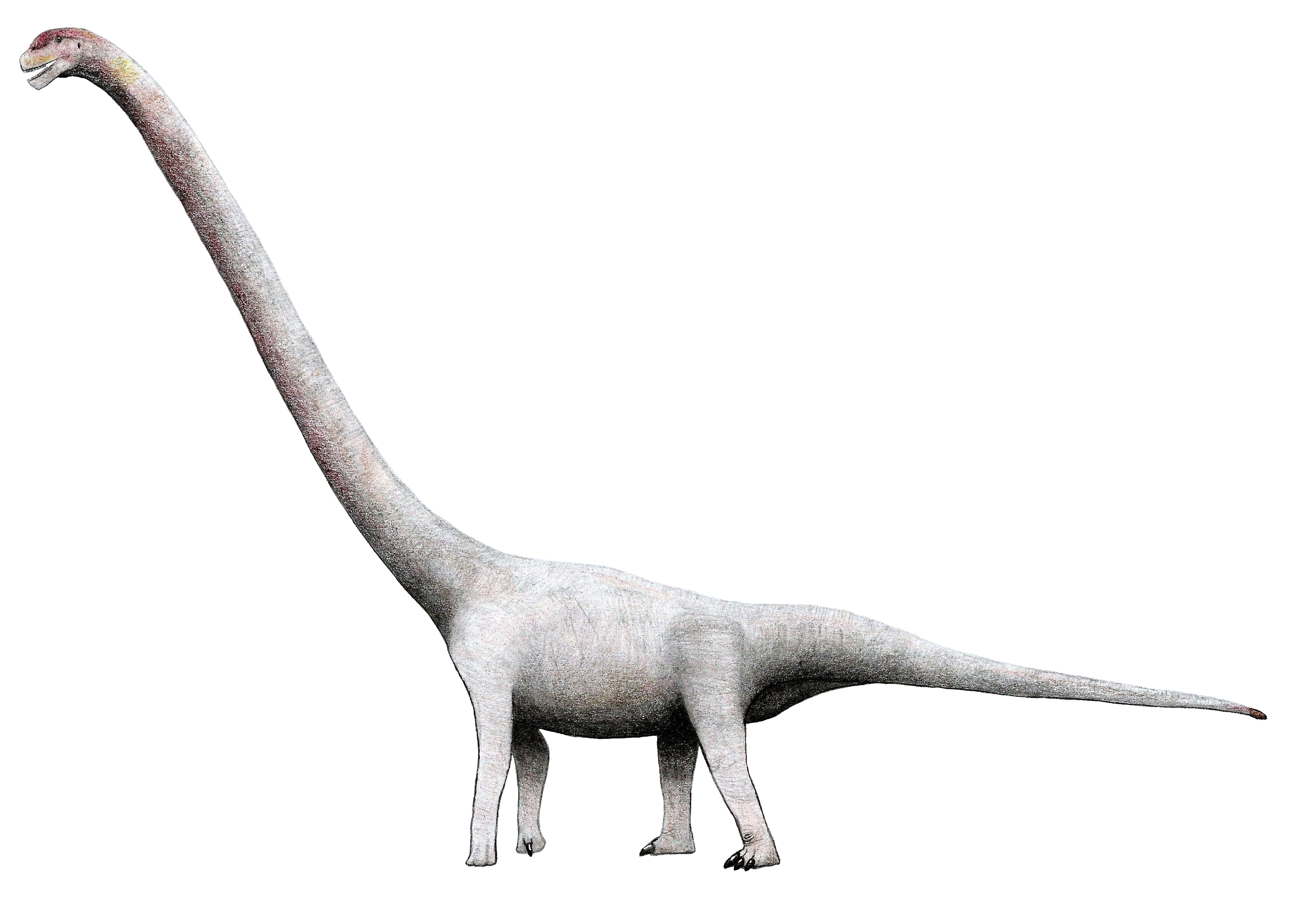
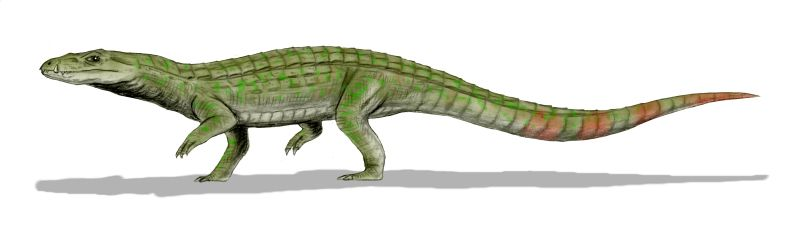
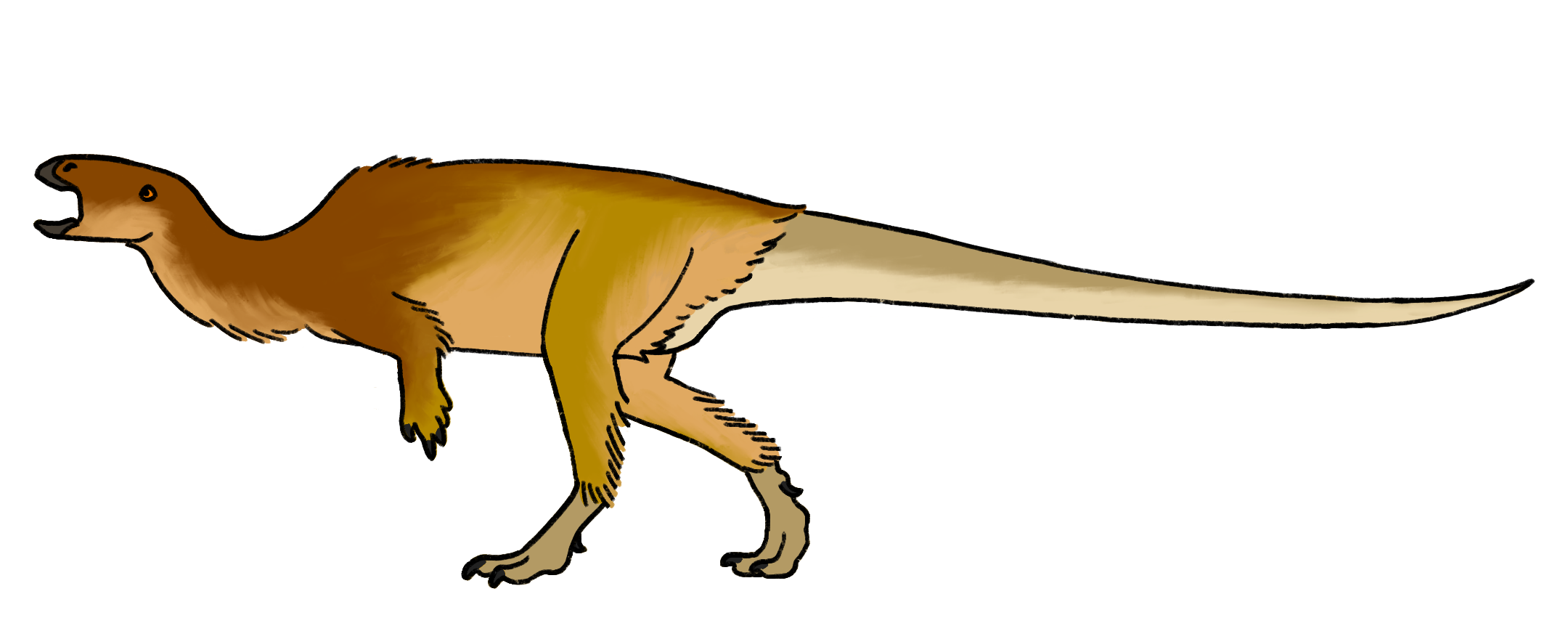
Speculative life restorations of various reptile genera known from the Upper Member of the Shaximiao Formation. In clockwise order from top left: Chungkingosaurus, Omeisaurus, Yandusaurus, and Sichuanosuchus

Many other fossil taxa have been found in localities of the Upper Shaximiao Formation, but they may not have been strictly coeval with Chialingosaurus. Many stegosaurs have been found in this part of the formation, including Chungkingosaurus, Gigantspinosaurus, Tuojiangosaurus, and Yingshanosaurus. Other dinosaurs discovered include sauropods (Daanosaurus, Mamenchisaurus, Omeisaurus, and Zigongosaurus), theropods (Chienkosaurus, Sinraptor (Yangchuanosaurus) hepingensis, Szechuanosaurus, and Yangchuanosaurus shangyouensis), and neornithischians (Gongbusaurus and Yandusaurus). The non-dinosaurian fauna includes several turtle species, crocodyliforms (Sichuanosuchus, Peipehsuchus, and Hsisosuchus), therapsids (Bienotheroides and Shunotherium), and fish (Chungkingichthys and Ceratodus).

The lower layers of the formation, which date to older ages, have also yielded a similar dinosaur fauna, including the stegosaurs Bashanosaurus and Huayangosaurus and various sauropods, theropods, basal ornithischians.

== See also ==
- Timeline of stegosaur research
