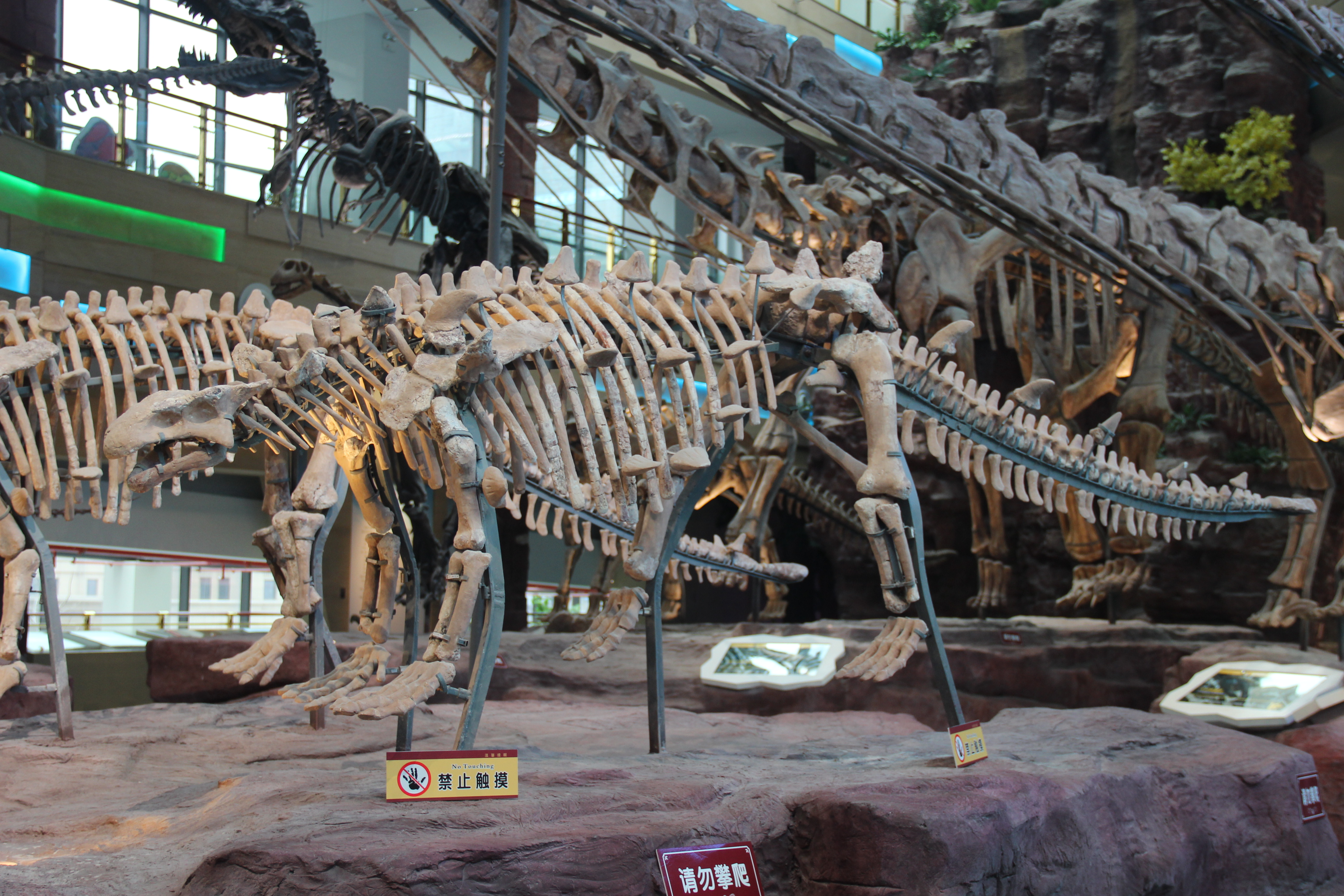
- Reconstructed skeleton, Anhui Geological Museum

Scientific classification
- Kingdom: Animalia
- Phylum: Chordata
- Class: Reptilia
- Clade: Dinosauria
- Clade: †Ornithischia
- Clade: †Thyreophora
- Clade: †Ankylosauria
- Family: †Ankylosauridae
- Subfamily: †Ankylosaurinae
- Genus: †Crichtonsaurus; Dong, 2002
- Species: †C. bohlini

Binomial name
- †Crichtonsaurus bohlini Dong, 2002

= Crichtonsaurus =

Crichtonsaurus Temporal range: Late Cretaceous, Cenomanian–Turonian

Extinct genus of dinosaurs

Crichtonsaurus (meaning "Crichton's lizard") is a dubious genus of herbivorous ankylosaurid dinosaur that lived during the Late Cretaceous in what is now China. It was named after Michael Crichton, the author of the dinosaur novel Jurassic Park. A sister taxon was discovered, C. benxiensis, which is now identified as a separate genus.

== History ==
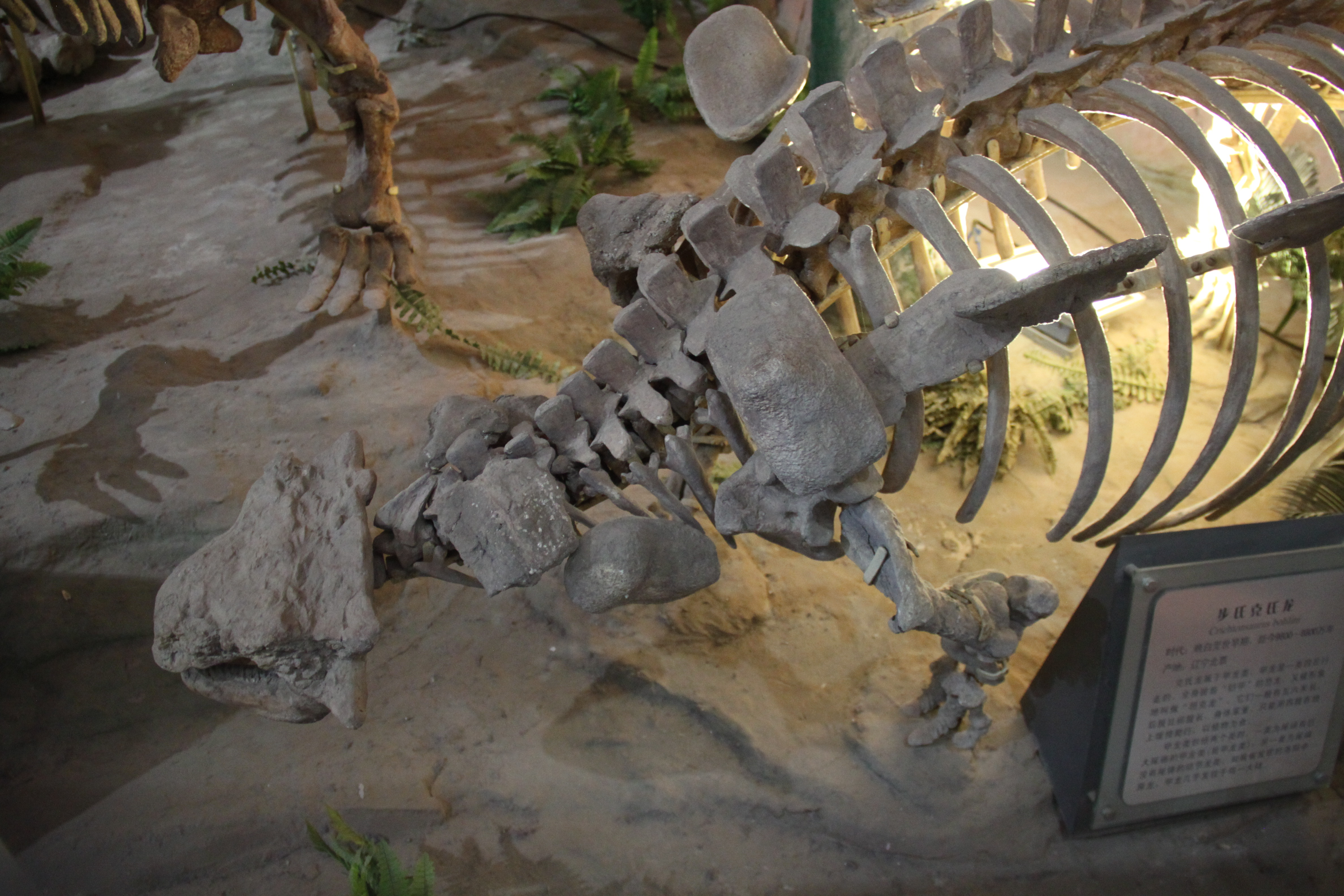
Front of reconstructed skeleton

The first fossils of the genus were discovered in 1999 in the Sunjiawan Formation of Xiafuxiang, near Beipiao in Liaoning Province, China. It was named and described by Dong Zhiming of the Institute of Vertebrate Paleontology and Paleoanthropology of the Chinese Academy of Sciences in 2002. The type species is Crichtonsaurus bohlini. The generic name is in honor of Michael Crichton, American author whose novels include Jurassic Park, The Andromeda Strain and others. The specific name honours Birger Bohlin, a Swedish paleontologist who during the 1930s took part in several paleontological expeditions to China. He described numerous Chinese ankylosaurs. As well as his work on dinosaurs and prehistoric mammals, Bohlin was part of the group that established the existence of Peking Man.

The holotype, IVPP V12745, was found in a layer of the Sunjiawan Formation dating from the Cenomanian-Turonian. It consists of a left lower jaw with three preserved teeth. Additionally, two specimens have been referred: IVPP V12746, consisting of two neck vertebrae and a back vertebra; and LPM 101, a partial postcranial skeleton including four sacral vertebrae, seven tail vertebrae. a shoulder blade, a coracoid, a humerus, a thighbone, foot bones, a cervical halfring and osteoderms. In 2014, Victoria Arbour pointed out that the referral of the additional specimens could not be justified because of a lack of overlapping material. She also failed to find any unique traits in the holotype itself, concluding that Crichtonsaurus bohlini was a nomen dubium.

As of 2014, Crichtonsaurus bohlini is one of four known ankylosaur species in Liaoning Province.

== Description ==
A terrestrial quadruped, Crichtonsaurus was squat, as seen in the short length of the humerus and femur. In 2010, Gregory S. Paul estimated the body length of the referred specimens at 3.5 metres (11 ft) and their weight at 500 kilograms (1,100 lb). As a member of the order Ornithischia, the genus had a backwards-facing pelvis, similar to that of birds. Dong describes notches near the base of the teeth. This taxon was a genus of armored dinosaurs, but it is unknown if it possessed a tail club, which may have been a feature exclusive to the subfamily Ankylosaurinae.

== Misassigned species ==
A second species, Crichtonsaurus benxiensis, was named by Lü Junchang, Ji Qiang, Gao Yubo and Li Zhixin in 2007. The specific name refers to the Benxi Geological Museum. The holotype, BXGMV0012, was discovered in the same early Late Cretaceous-age (Cenomanian-Turonian) Sunjiawan Formation of Beipiao, Liaoning, as the type species. It consists of a complete skull. Additionally, specimen BXGMV0012-1 has been referred, a partial skeleton lacking the skull, found at the same location. Also, according to Arbour, a skeleton displayed at the Sihetun Fossil Museum under the name of C. bohlini, probably belongs to C. benxiensis. Paul suggested C. benxiensis were a junior synonym of C. bohlini. However, apart from indicating C. bohlini as a dubious species to which no other species can be justifiably seen as identical, Arbour established diagnostic differences between the shoulder blades of BXGMV0012-1 and LPM 101, so two ankylosaurid taxa seem to be present in the formation. Based upon her conclusion that C. bohlini was a nomen dubium, Arbour suggested a new generic name for the second species: Crichtonpelta, for the time being an invalid nomen ex dissertatione. However, in 2015, the name was validly published and it was officially separated from the dubious type species C. bohlini.

== See also ==
- Timeline of ankylosaur research
