= Sunjiawan Formation =

Geological formation in Liaoning, China

- Stratigraphic range: Early Cenomanian; ~99–95 Ma
- Type: Geological formation
- Overlies: Unconformity with Fuxin Formation

Lithology
- Primary: Conglomerate
- Other: Sandstone, siltstone, mudstone

Location
- Coordinates: 41.7°N 120.8°E
- Approximate paleocoordinates: 46.2°N 112.1°E
- Region: Liaoning
- Country: China
- Extent: Beipiao Basin
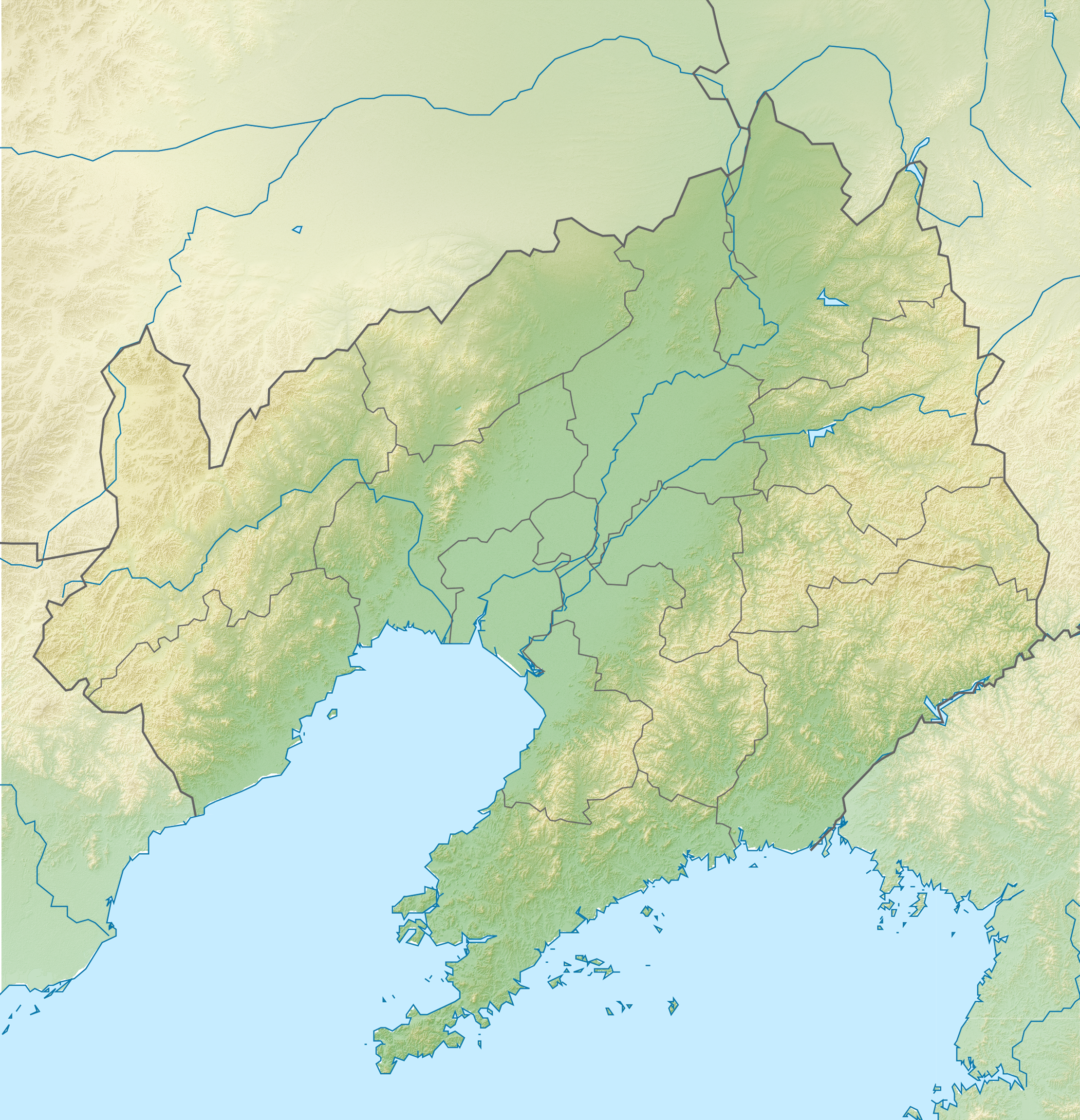
- Sunjiawan Formation (China) Sunjiawan Formation (Liaoning)

The Sunjiawan Formation (simplified Chinese: 孙家湾组; traditional Chinese: 孫家灣組; pinyin: Sūnjiāwān Zǔ) is a geological formation in Liaoning, China, with strata possibly dating back to the early Late Cretaceous, specifically the Cenomanian. Dinosaur remains are among the fossils that have been recovered from the formation. It forms part of the same geological sequence as the older and underlying Yixian Formation and Jiufotang Formation. It primarily consists of variegated conglomerates with rare intercalations of thin bedded sandstones, siltstones and mudstones.

== Fossil content ==
Remains of the following dinosaurs have been found in the formation:

Color key: Taxon / Reclassified taxon / Taxon falsely reported as present / Dubious taxon or junior synonym / Ichnotaxon / Ootaxon / Morphotaxon	Notes; Uncertain or tentative taxa are in small text; ~~crossed out~~ taxa are discredited.

=== Dinosaurs ===
==== Ankylosaurs ====
Ankylosaurs of the Sunjiawan Formation
Genus	Species	Location	Stratigraphic position	Material	Notes	Images
Crichtonpelta	C. benxiensis			A partial skeleton.	A ankylosaurine ankylosaurid	
Crichtonsaurus	C. bohlini			A partial skeleton.	A ankylosaurine ankylosaurid	

==== Ornithopods ====
Ornithopods of the Sunjiawan Formation
Genus	Species	Location	Stratigraphic position	Material	Notes	Images
Hadrosauroidea Indet.	Indeterminate			Dental remains	Different with Shuangmiaosaurus from the same stratigraphic unit	
Shuangmiaosaurus	S. gilmorei			A partial left upper jaw and lower jaw.	A styracosternan ornithopod	

==== Sauropods ====
Sauropods of the Sunjiawan Formation
Genus	Species	Location	Stratigraphic position	Material	Notes	Images
Borealosaurus	B. wimani			Two caudal vertebra, humerus and isolated tooth crown	A titanosaurian sauropod	
Titanosauriformes Indet.	Indeterminate			Single tooth	Provisionally attributed to Borealosaurus	

==== Theropods ====
Theropods of the Sunjiawan Formation
Genus	Species	Location	Stratigraphic position	Material	Notes	Images
Tyrannosauroidea Indet.	Indeterminate			Single tooth		

== See also ==
- List of dinosaur-bearing rock formations
- Zhumapu Formation
