= Hebei Geo University =

Provincial public university in Shijiazhuang, Hebei, China

Coordinates: 38°01′32″N 114°33′14″E

Hebei Geo University (Chinese: 河北地质大学; lit. 'Hebei Geology University'), is a provincial public university in Shijiazhuang, Hebei, China. It is affiliated with the Province of Hebei.

The school was founded in 1953 as the Xuanhua Geological School of the Ministry of Geology of the Central People's Government. In 1955, it was renamed Xuanhua Geology School of the Ministry of Geology. In 1970, it was renamed Hebei Xuanhua Geology School. In 1971, it was renamed Hebei Institute of Geology. In June 1985, the school moved from Xuanhua to Shijiazhuang. In March 2016, it was renamed Hebei Geology University.
