= Chongqing Natural History Museum =

Museum in Chongqing, China

- 重庆自然博物馆
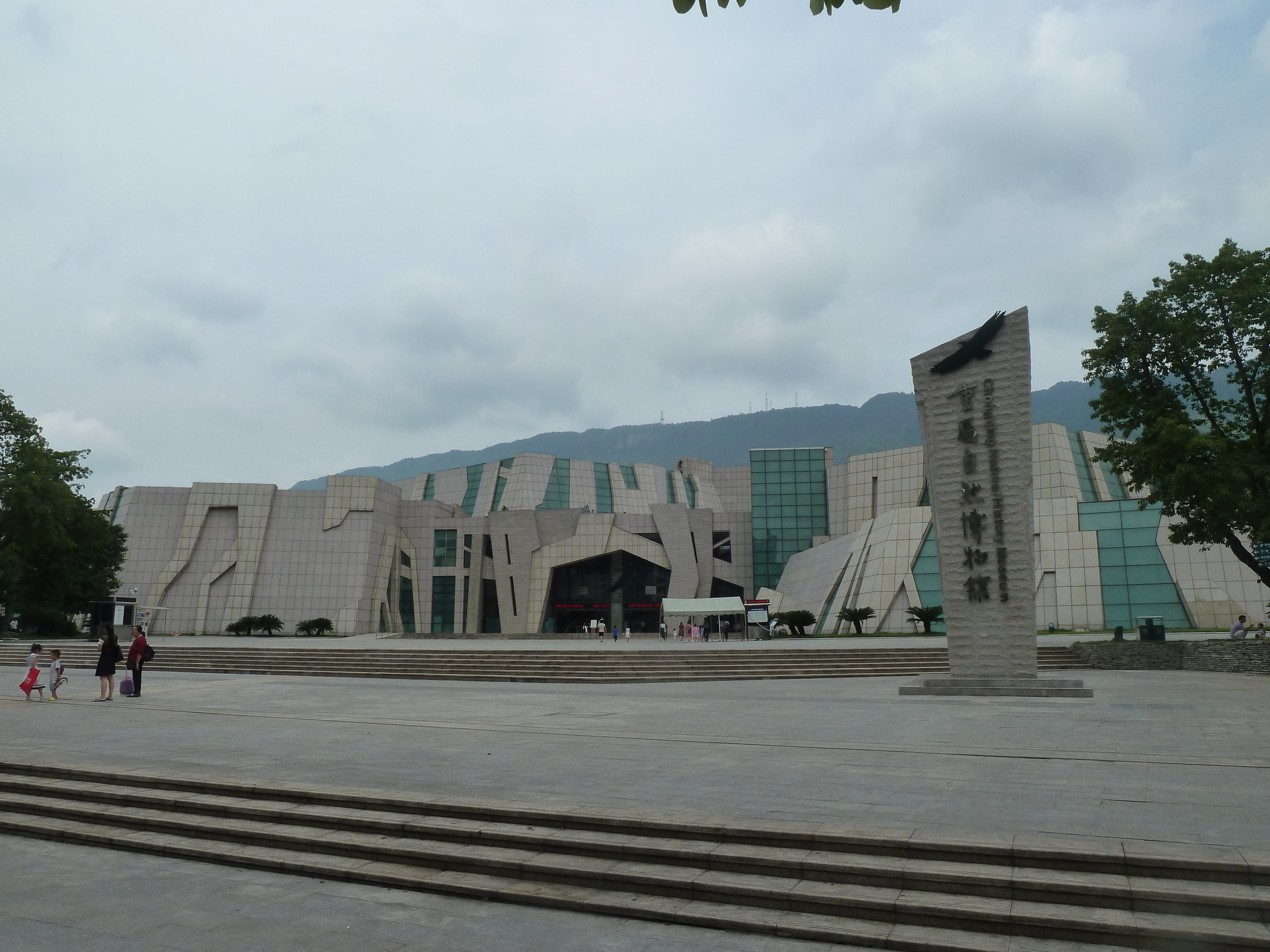
- Main entrance of the museum
- Former name: Western Museum of China
- Established: 1944
- Location: No.398, Jinhua Road, Beibei, Chongqing, China
- Coordinates: 29.82353°N 106.41475°E
- Collections: Natural history

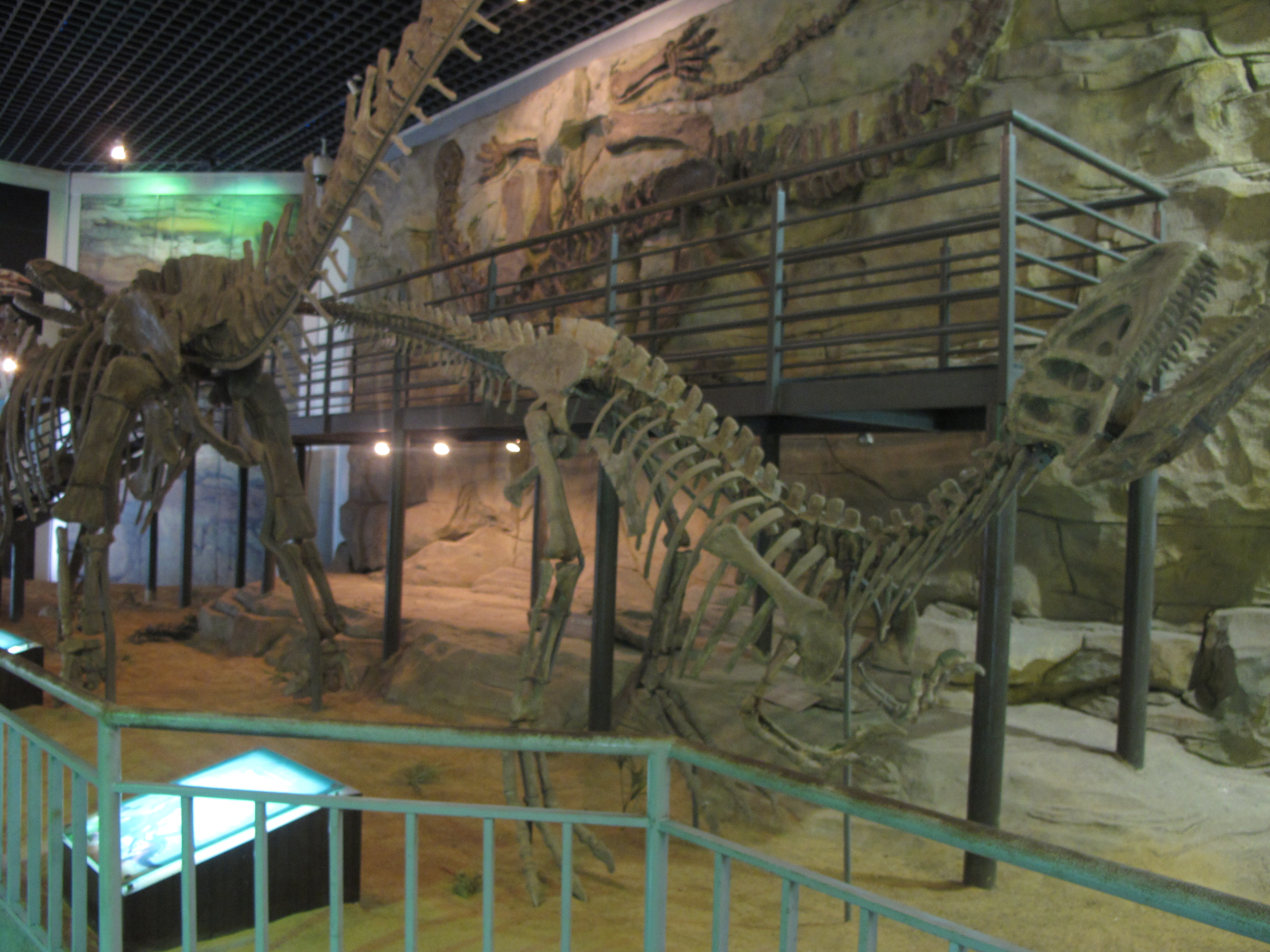
Szechuanosaurus campi exhibit

The Chongqing Natural History Museum (Chinese: 重庆自然博物馆) is a natural history museum in Beibei District, Chongqing, China.

The museum founded in 1944, originally as the Western Museum of China. It changed its name in 1981. The museum has a collection of about 70,000 specimens covering animals, minerals, paleontology, plants, and Stone Age period wares. It includes several dinosaur skeletons from the Sichuan Province. especially since the 1970s from around Zigong. The exhibits include the skeletons of the dinosaurs Omeisaurus and the Tuojiangosaurus. The museum also publishes books on dinosaurs.

The original museum building was in the Beibei District. A new museum building in the Yuzhong District was under construction as of 2013, consisting of six exhibition halls and covering an area of 14.4 hectares. The museum is now located at the base of Jinyun Mountain in Beibei District. It was designed with an idea from nature, namely the spreading roots of Ficus virens, which is Chongqing's official city tree. The predecessors of the museum were the Science Academy of West China, founded in 1930 by the businessman Lu Zuofu (1893–1952) and the Western Museum of China, which amalgamated with the Chinese West Academy and over ten other institutions in 1943. The museum has six permanent exhibition halls: Animal Planet, Dinosaur World, Landscape Metropolis, Earth Mystery, Life Stream, and Ecological Homeland. These display the evolution of life on earth, biodiversity, and the natural history of Chongqing.

== See also ==
- List of museums in China
