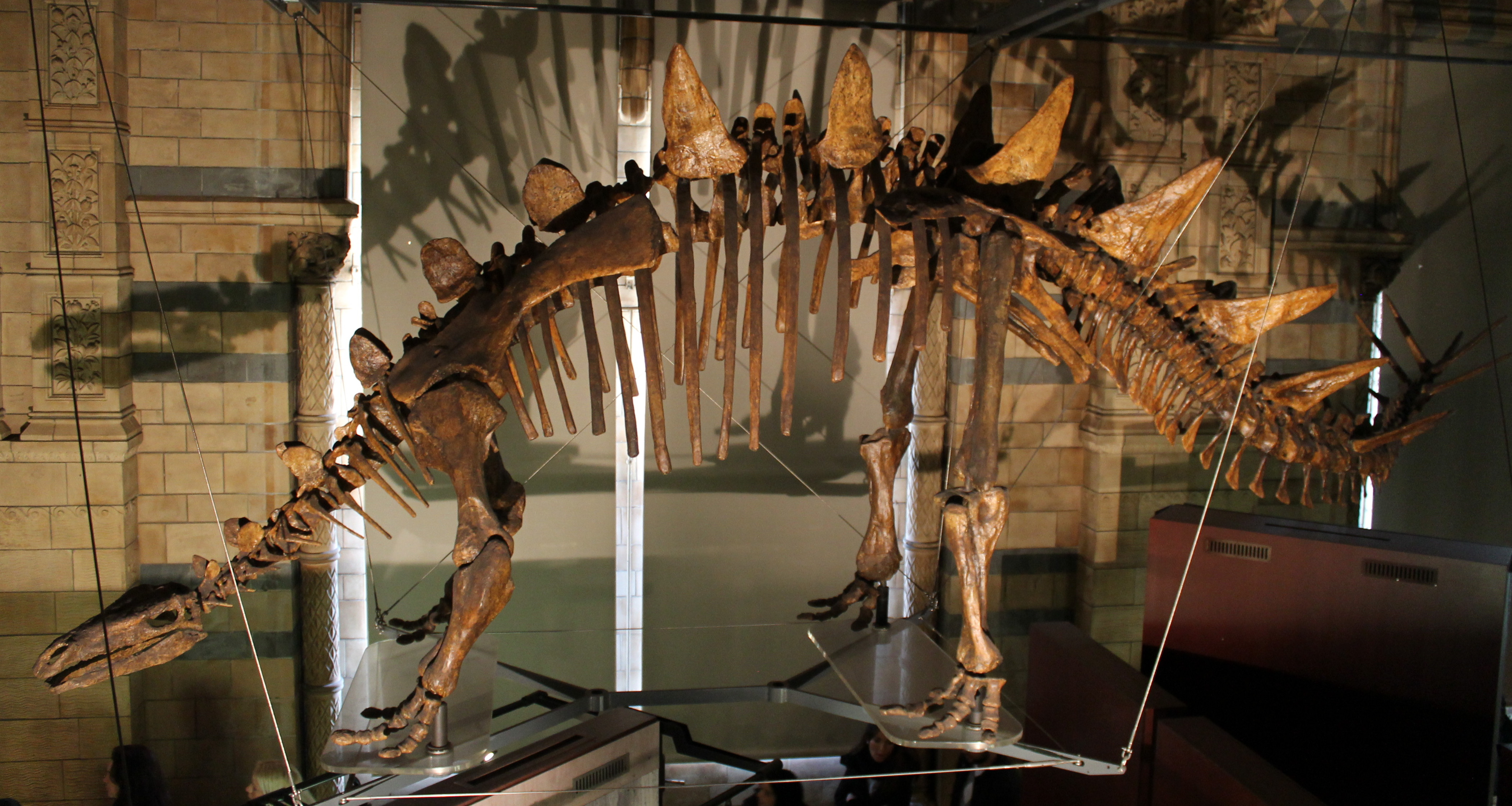
- Mounted skeleton (NHMUK PV R 12158) at the Natural History Museum, London

Scientific classification
- Kingdom: Animalia
- Phylum: Chordata
- Class: Reptilia
- Clade: Dinosauria
- Clade: †Ornithischia
- Clade: †Thyreophora
- Clade: †Stegosauria
- Family: †Stegosauridae
- Genus: †Tuojiangosaurus; Dong et al., 1977
- Species: †T. multispinus

Binomial name
- †Tuojiangosaurus multispinus Dong et al., 1977

= Tuojiangosaurus =

Tuojiangosaurus Temporal range: Late Jurassic, 163.5–157.3 Ma

Extinct genus of dinosaurs

Tuojiangosaurus (meaning "Tuo River lizard") is a genus of herbivorous stegosaurian dinosaur from the Late Jurassic Period, recovered from the Upper Shaximiao Formation of what is now Sichuan Province in China.

== Description ==
Size comparison

Tuojiangosaurus was a large stegosaur, reaching 6.5–7 metres (21–23 ft) in length and 2.8 metric tons (3.1 short tons) in body mass. Physically similar to the North American Stegosaurus, Tuojiangosaurus is the best understood of the Chinese stegosaurs.

In 1977, Dong provided a diagnosis but this largely consisted of traits shared with other stegosaurus. In 1990, Peter Malcolm Galton pointed out an autapomorphy: the spines of the vertebrae of the tail base possess spines with bony skirts running from their front to the sides. In 2006, Susannah Maidment and Guangbiao Wei would identify two other diagnostic characters: the frontal bones are wider than they are long, and the supraacetabular and posterior processes of the ilium are well-separated.

Tuojiangosaurus has the typical narrow and low head, bulky body, and low teeth of other stegosaurids. The limbs, especially the arms, are rather short. There are at least twenty-five dentary teeth. The teeth have a thick base, cingulum, merging at the inside into a triangular vertical median ridge. The dorsal vertebrae have tall neural arches. The shoulder blade has a rectangular acromion.

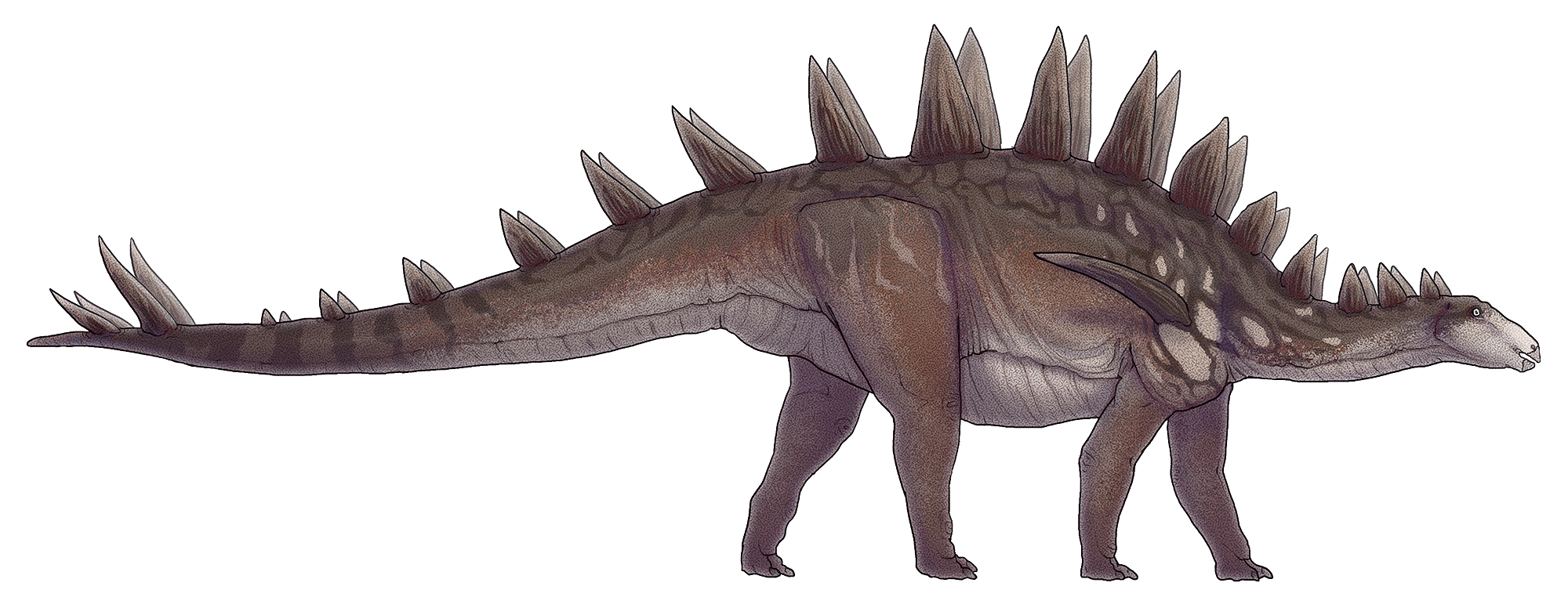
Restoration

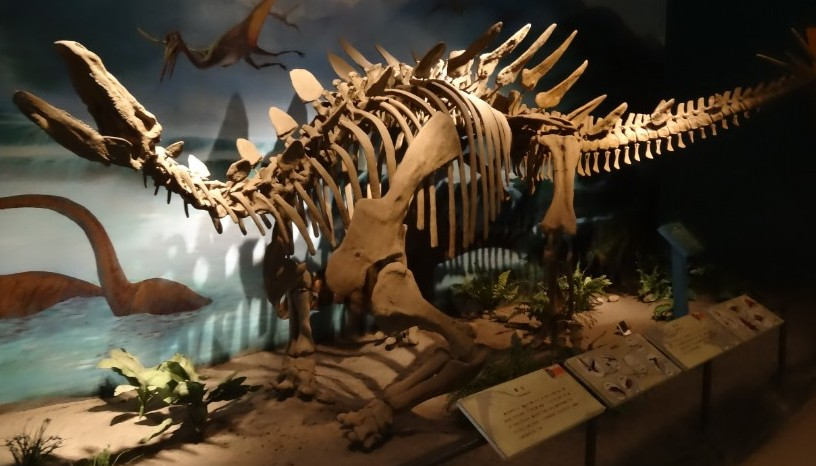
Reconstructed skeleton

Like Kentrosaurus, Tuojiangosaurus had two rows of plates along the spine, which became taller over the hip region. Those at the neck and front trunk were rounded or pear-shaped; the plates at the rear back became more triangular and pointed. All plates have a thickened central section, as if they were modified spikes. Unlike Stegosaurus, the plates of Tuojiangosaurus were parallel to each other. Dong estimated there were about seventeen pairs of plates and spikes. Tuojiangosaurus had at least two outward-pointing, rather robust, spikes on each side of the end of the tail, angled at approximately 45 degrees to the vertical. In stegosauridae, this spike arrangement has become affectionately known as the "thagomizer". Dong thought it were possible that there were four pairs of spikes. Paul, based on "Chungkingosaurus sp. 3" specimen CV 00208, interpreted the thagomizer as a "pin-cushion array", with two vertical pairs of thick spikes and a third pair of narrow spikes pointing to behind.

== Discovery ==
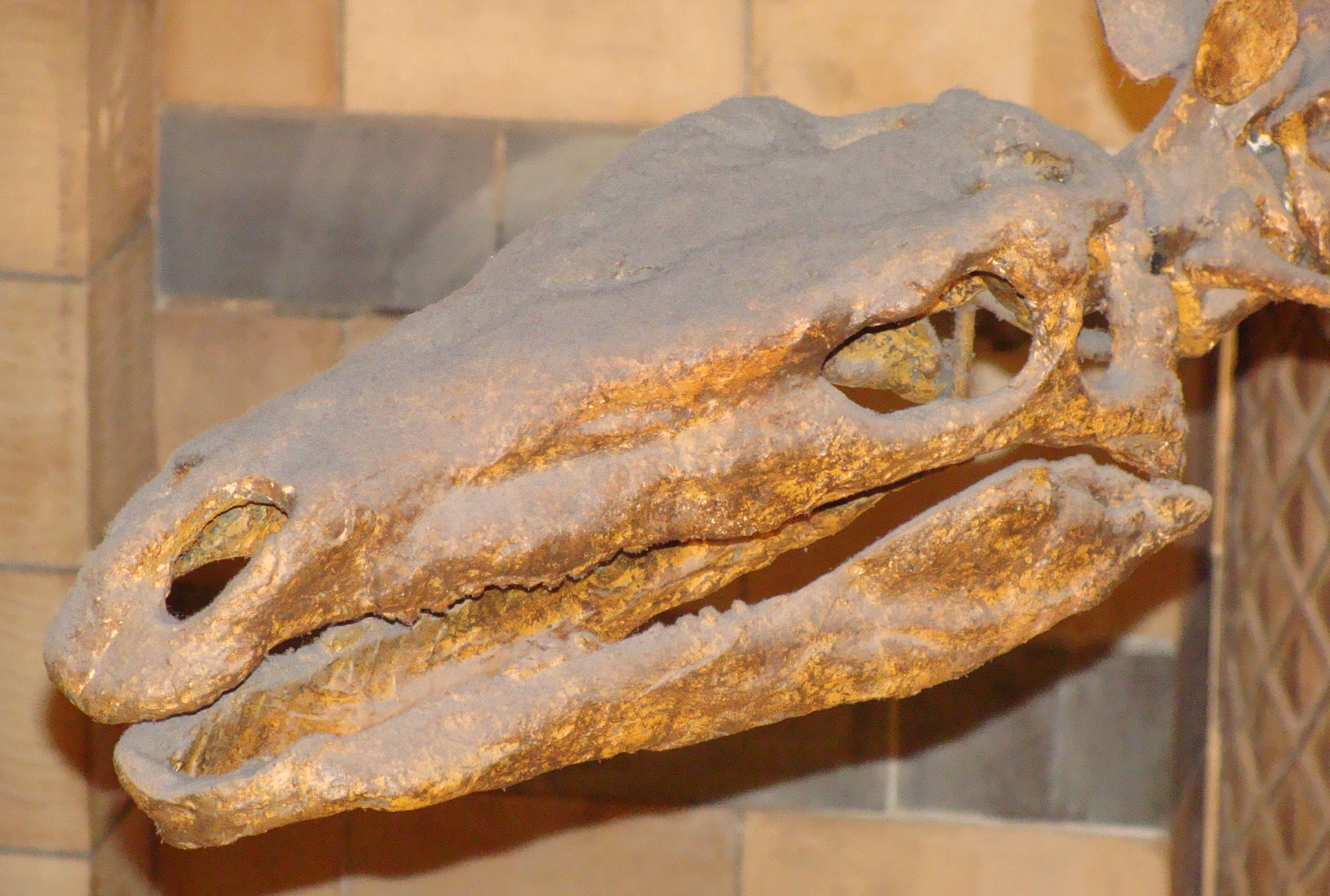
Skull of the mount

In 1974, during construction of the Wujiaba dam in Zigong, Sichuan, the remains of a stegosaurian were found.

The type and only species of Tuojiangosaurus, Tuojiangosaurus multispinus, was named and described in 1977 (exactly a hundred years after the naming of Stegosaurus by Othniel Charles Marsh) by Dong Zhiming, Zhou Shiwu, Li Xuanmin and Chang Yijong. The generic name is derived from the River (jiāng) Tuo, near which the holotype was found. The specific name is derived from Latin multus, "many", and spina, "spine".

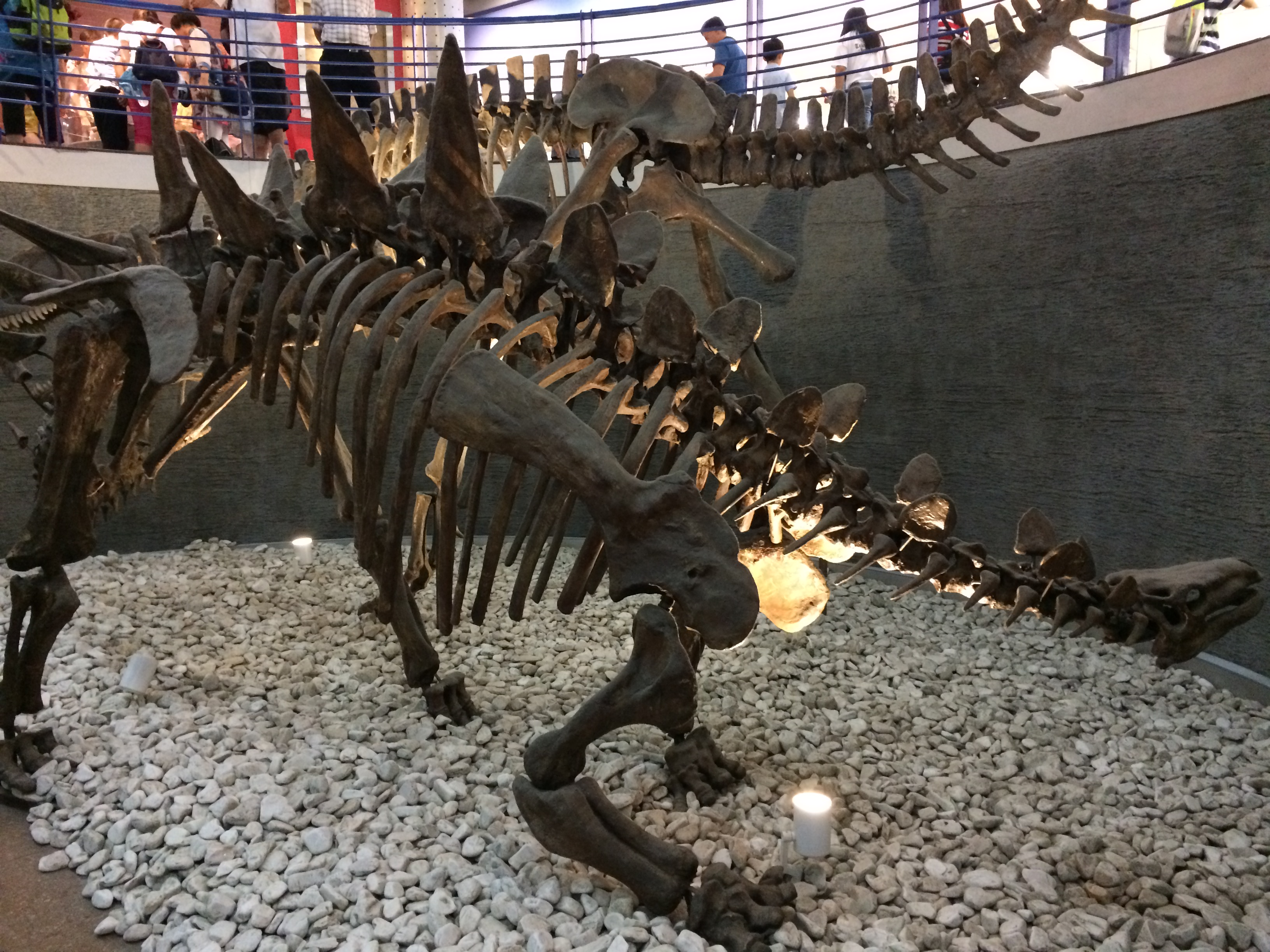
A mounted skeleton at the Beijing Museum of Natural History, confronting a Yangchuanosaurus

The holotype, CV 209, was found in a layer of the Upper Shaximiao Formation, dating from the Oxfordian-Kimmeridgian. It consists of a rather complete skeleton that however lacks parts of the skull, lower jaws, tail and limbs. In 1977, it represented the most complete stegosaurian skeleton found in Asia. The paratype was specimen CV 210, a sacrum. The whereabouts of some of the holotype skeleton were unknown as of 2006.

A mounted skeleton of Tuojiangosaurus multispinus is on display at the Municipal Museum of Chongqing. In addition, a mounted cast (NHMUK PV R 12158) is on display at the Natural History Museum, in London. Another mount is displayed in the Beijing Museum of Natural History in a conflict with Yangchuanosaurus. A cast of the original fossilised dinosaur skeleton, found at Wujiaba Quarry 1977 is also on display at Bolton Museum, United Kingdom.

== Classification ==
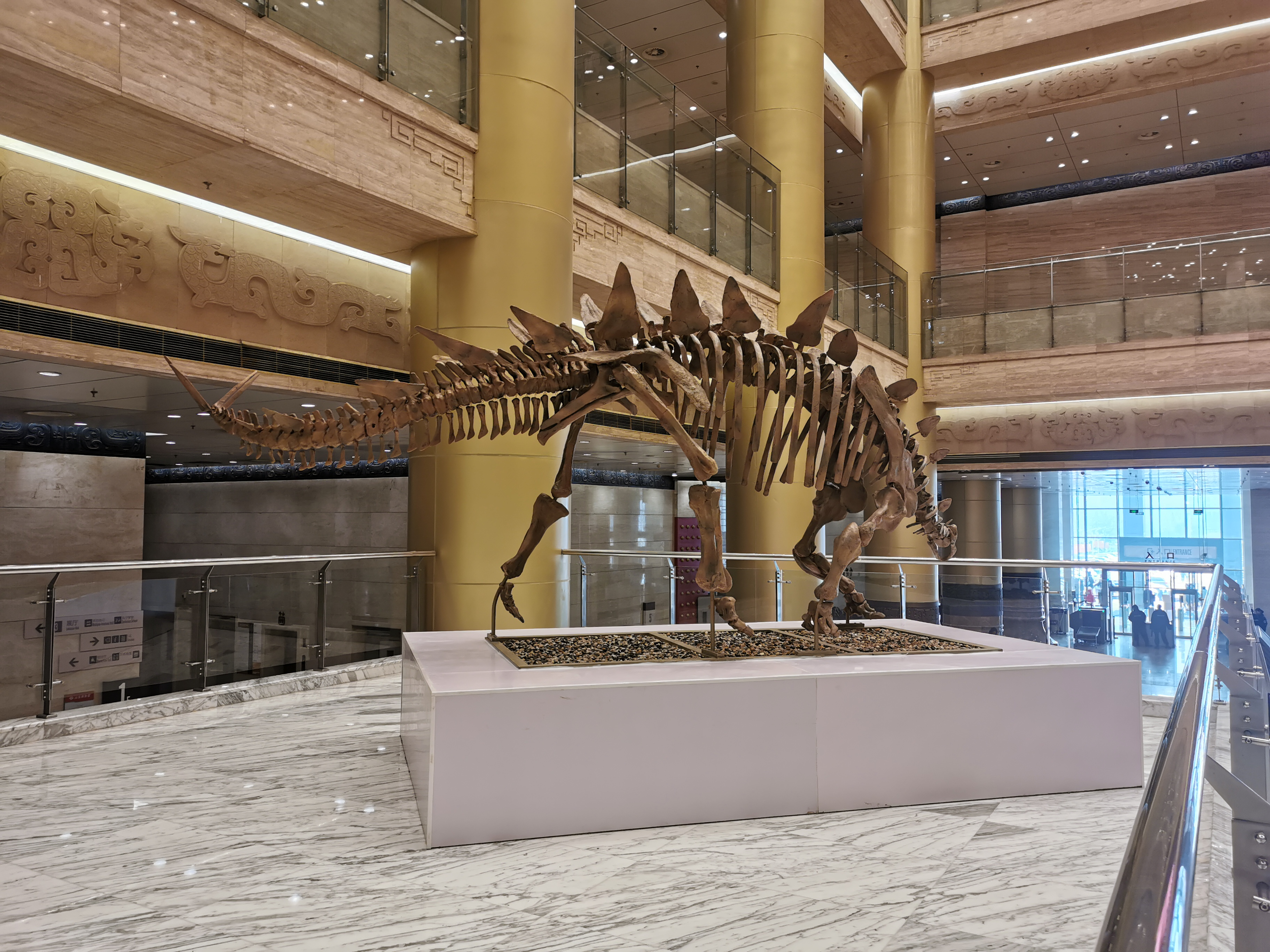
Tuojiangosaurus in Shandong Museum

Tuojiangosaurus was by Dong placed in Stegosauridae in 1977, more precisely in the Stegosaurinae. In 2004, a cladistic analysis by Galton recovered Tuojiangosaurus in a rather derived position, as a sister species of Chialingosaurus. An analysis by Octávio Mateus, Maidment, and Nicolai Christiansen, published in 2009, found that Tuojiangosaurus fell outside of Stegosauridae, though its exact position in Stegosauria (either as an early branching member of the group or a later branching species closer to stegosaurids) was uncertain due to the relatively fragmentary nature of the remains. A more comprehensive analysis by Raven and Maidment in 2017 found that it grouped with Huayangosaurus and its relatives.

== Paleobiology ==
Tuojiangosaurus ate low-lying, ground vegetation. Paul suggested that Chialingosaurus and Chungkingosaurus were in fact the juveniles of Tuojiangosaurus.

== See also ==
- Timeline of stegosaur research
