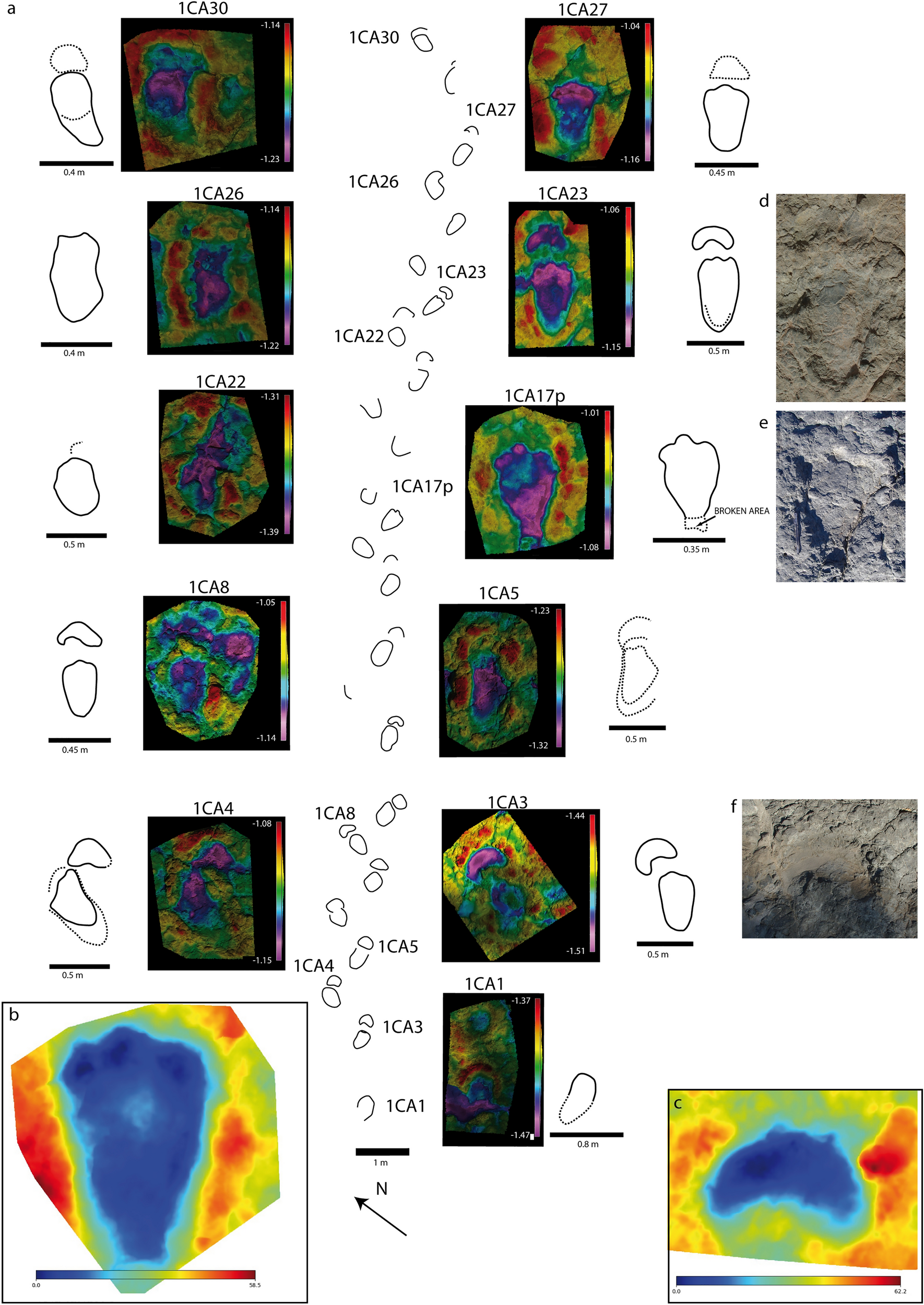
- Holotype trackway of D. ibiricus including hand and footprints

Trace fossil classification
- Ichnogenus: †Deltapodus; Whyte & Romano, 1994

Type ichnospecies
- †Deltapodus brodricki Whyte & Romano, 1994

Other species
- †Deltapodus curriei Xing et al., 2013; †Deltapodus ibericus Cobos et al., 2010

= Deltapodus =

Deltapodus Temporal range: Middle Jurassic–Late Cretaceous

Dinosaur footprint

Deltapodus is an ichnogenus of stegosaurian dinosaur footprint. Three ichnospecies have been described in the genus: Deltapodus brodricki from England and the United States, Deltapodus ibericus from Spain and Portugal, and Deltapodus curriei from China. Other tracks referable to the genus but not assignable to a species are also known.

The type species, D. brodricki, is known from the Saltwick Formation of England and the Morrison Formation of the United States. D. curriei is known from the Tugulu Group of China, and may represent the tracks of the stegosaur genus Wuerhosaurus. D. ibericus is known from the Lourinhã Formation of Portugal and the Villar del Arzobispo Formation of Spain. Tracks of indeterminate Deltapodus species are known from the Lameta Formation of India and the Iouaridène Formation of Morocco.

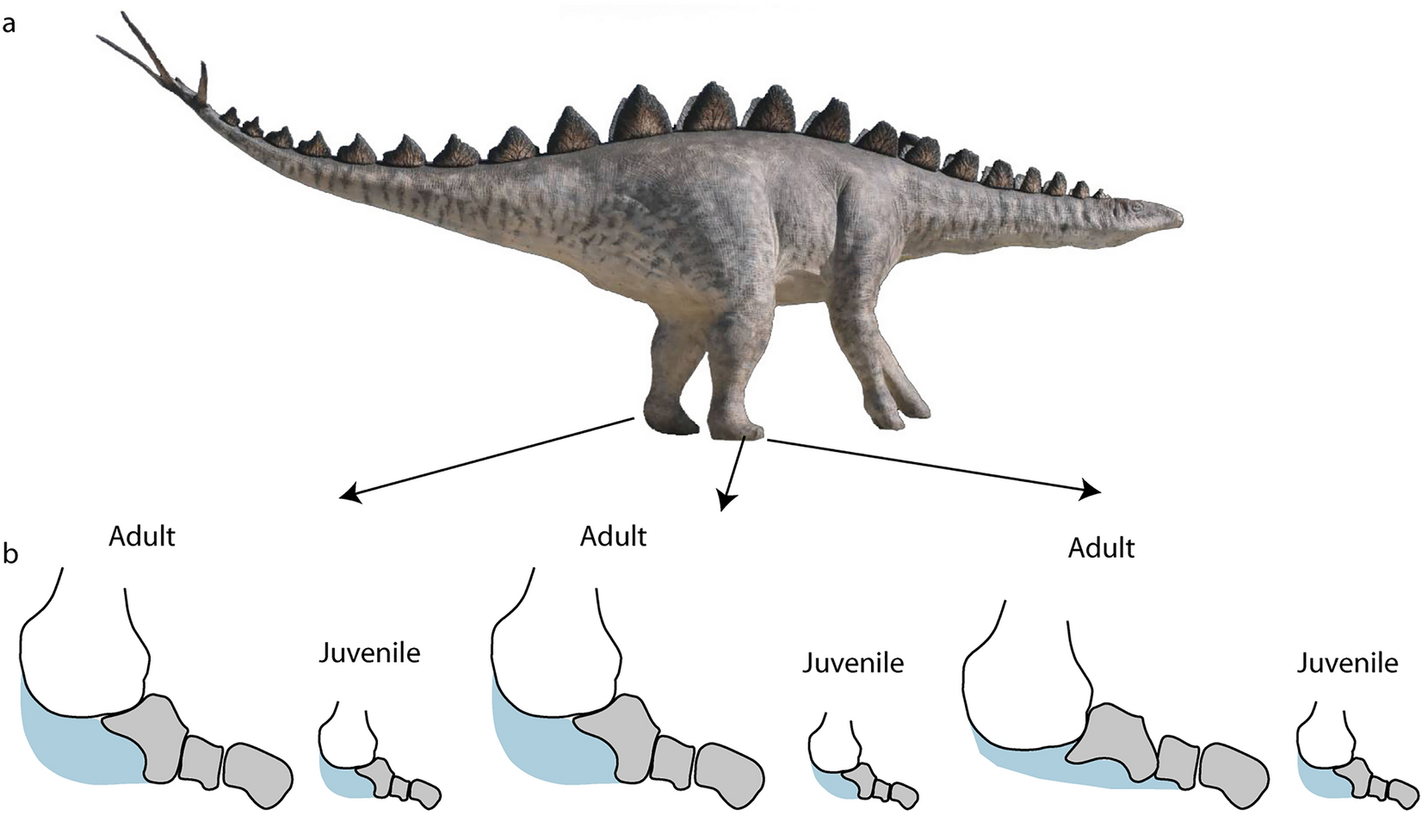
The stegosaur Dacentrurus and the possible variation in heel pad size based on D. ibiricus tracks

== See also ==
- Stegopodus
- List of dinosaur ichnogenera
