= Baiyinosaurus =

Baiyinosaurus Temporal range: Middle Jurassic, late Bathonian
- Skeletal reconstruction

Scientific classification
- Kingdom: Animalia
- Phylum: Chordata
- Clade: Dinosauria
- Clade: †Ornithischia
- Clade: †Thyreophora
- Clade: †Stegosauria
- Family: †Huayangosauridae
- Genus: †Baiyinosaurus; Ning et al., 2024
- Species: †B. baojiensis

Binomial name
- †Baiyinosaurus baojiensis Ning et al., 2024

Genus of stegosaurian dinosaurs

Baiyinosaurus (meaning "Baiyin reptile") is an extinct genus of stegosaurian dinosaurs from the Middle Jurassic Wangjiashan Formation of China. The genus contains a single species, B. baojiensis, known from a partial skeleton including cranial bones. The skeletal anatomy of Baiyinosaurus demonstrates transitional features between basal thyreophorans and stegosaurs. While many stegosaurs are known from China, Baiyinosaurus is the only one currently named from Gansu Province.

== Discovery and naming ==
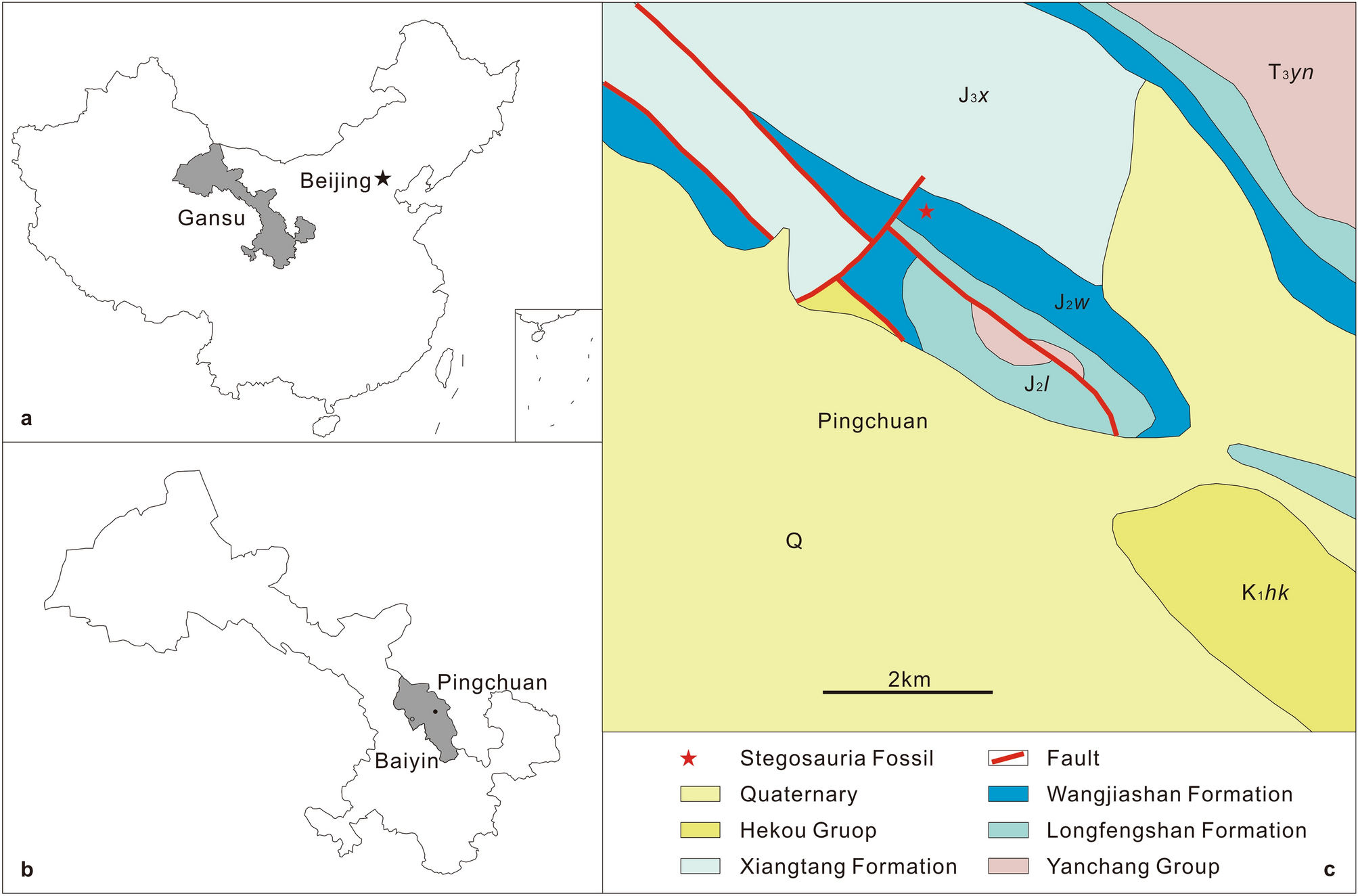
Type locality in Gansu Province, China

The Baiyinosaurus holotype specimen, IVPG-D021, was discovered in 2016 by Li Daqing and his crew during excavations in sediments of the Wangjiashan Formation (Straw-yellow Sandstone Member). These outcrops are in the Pingchuan District of the city of Baiyin in Gansu Province, China. Following their discovery, the bones were collected and prepared by the Gansu Zhendan Dinosaur Culture Communication Co. Ltd., and reposited at Gansu Agricultural University.

The holotype specimen consists of a partial skeleton, comprising fragmentary bones of the cranium (left premaxilla and maxilla, frontals, probable right jugal and squamosal, and left dentary) and several vertebrae (the atlas, seven dorsal vertebrae, and a caudal vertebra).

In 2024, Ning et al. described Baiyinosaurus baojiensis as a new genus and species of stegosaurian dinosaurs based on these fossil remains. The generic name, Baiyinosaurus, combines a reference to Baiyin—the city where the holotype was found—with the Greek σαῦρος (sauros), meaning "reptile". The specific name, baojiensis, references the type locality in the Baojishan Basin in the Qilian Mountains.

Baiyinosaurus is the only novel stegosaur species currently named from Gansu Province. The remains of a Cretaceous stegosaur, tentatively referred to Stegosaurus sp., were described earlier in 2024 from the Hekou Group which has outcrops in this province, but not assigned to a new taxon.

== Description ==
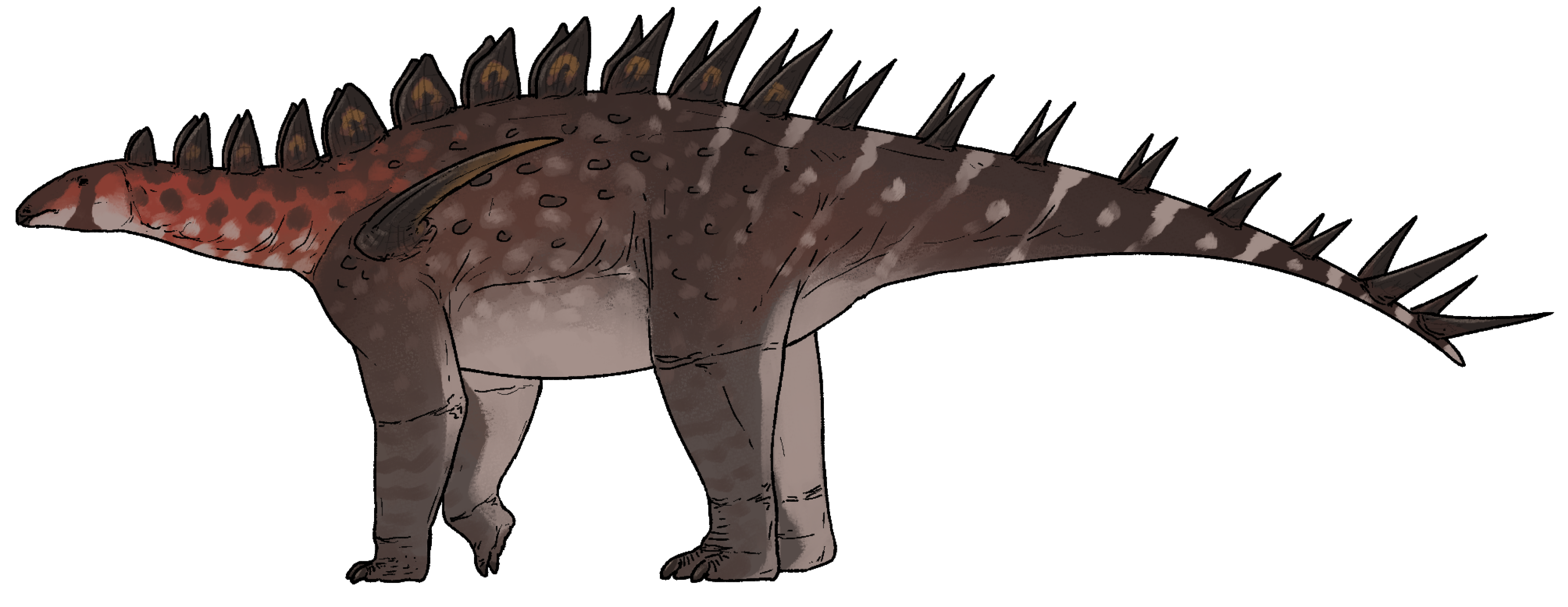
Life restoration

As a stegosaur, Baiyinosaurus would have been a quadrupedal herbivore with a paired row of a combination of large plates and spines running along the top of the animal from the neck to the tail tip. The purpose of these armor pieces is debated, but the plates have been suggested to play a role in display, species recognition, and/or thermoregulation, and the spikes were likely served as defensive structures.

While the Baiyinosaurus fossil material generally resembles stegosaurs in morphology, several features are also reminiscent of basal thyreophorans such as Scelidosaurus and Emausaurus, indicating that Baiyinosaurus had both plesiomorphic thyreophoran traits as well as derived stegosaurian traits. Bashanosaurus, one of the basalmost stegosaurs from older rocks in China, also exhibits a similar blend of features, demonstrating the transitional states from early armored dinosaurs to the divergent body plans of stegosaurs and ankylosaurs.

The holotype specimen of Baiyinosaurus belongs likely belongs to an adult individual. This can be determined as the neurocentral sutures on the dorsal vertebrae are fused and not visible, while they would be open and unfused in a juvenile.

=== Skull ===
Reconstructed skull

Baiyinosaurus is known from several skull bones. The posterior subnarial process of the left premaxilla (upper jaw bone at the tip of the snout) is preserved and has an expanded surface where it would contact the nasal. The front and middle part of the left maxilla (primary tooth-bearing bone of the upper jaw) is known, and indicates that this tooth row is inset medially (toward the middle of the skull), a feature expected in most ornithischian dinosaurs. A partial bone—likely the right jugal—is known, and has a triradiate form with a very expanded dorsal process. Another fragment—tentatively identified as the dorsal part of the right squamosal—includes visible sutures where it would be overlapped by the parietal and postorbital.

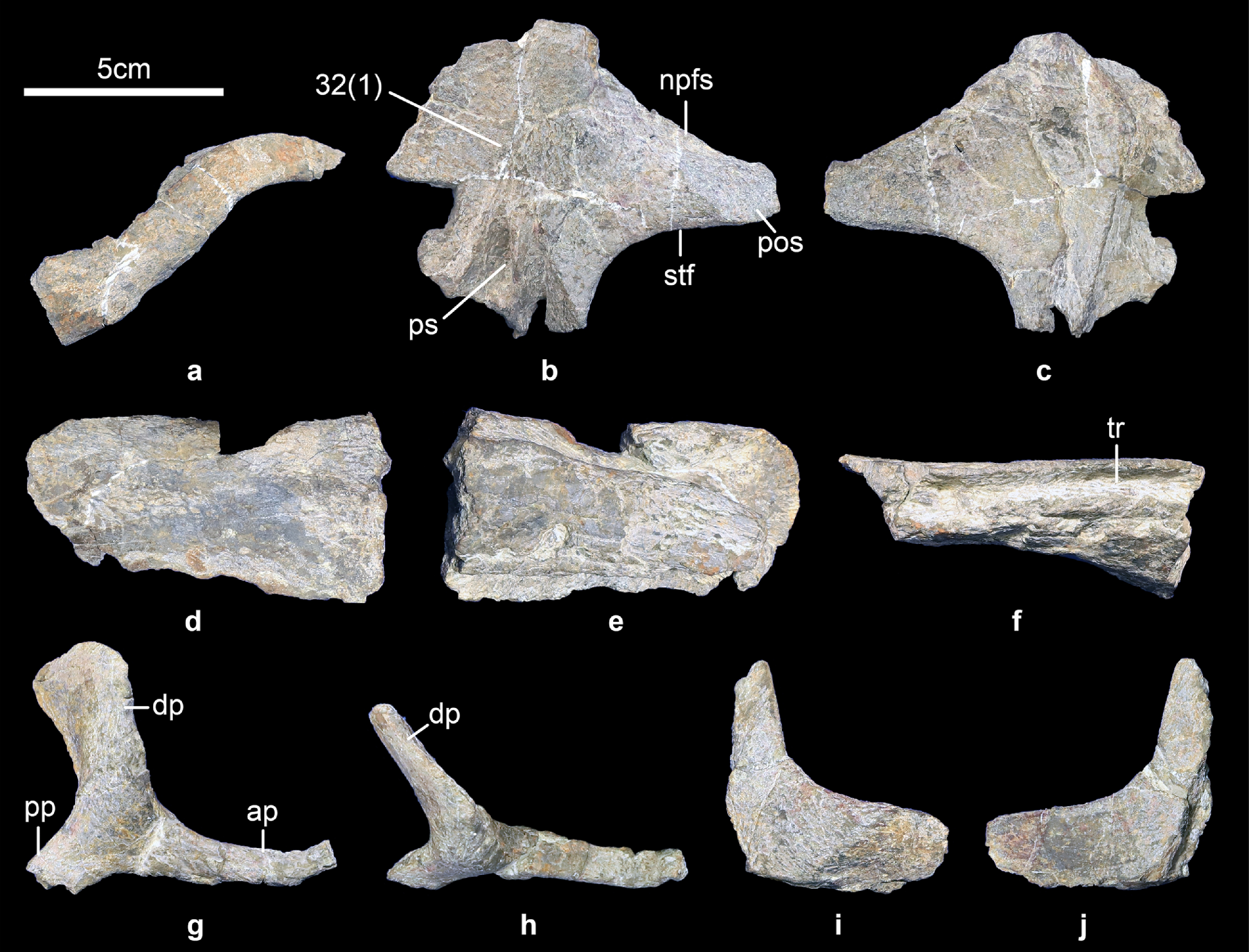
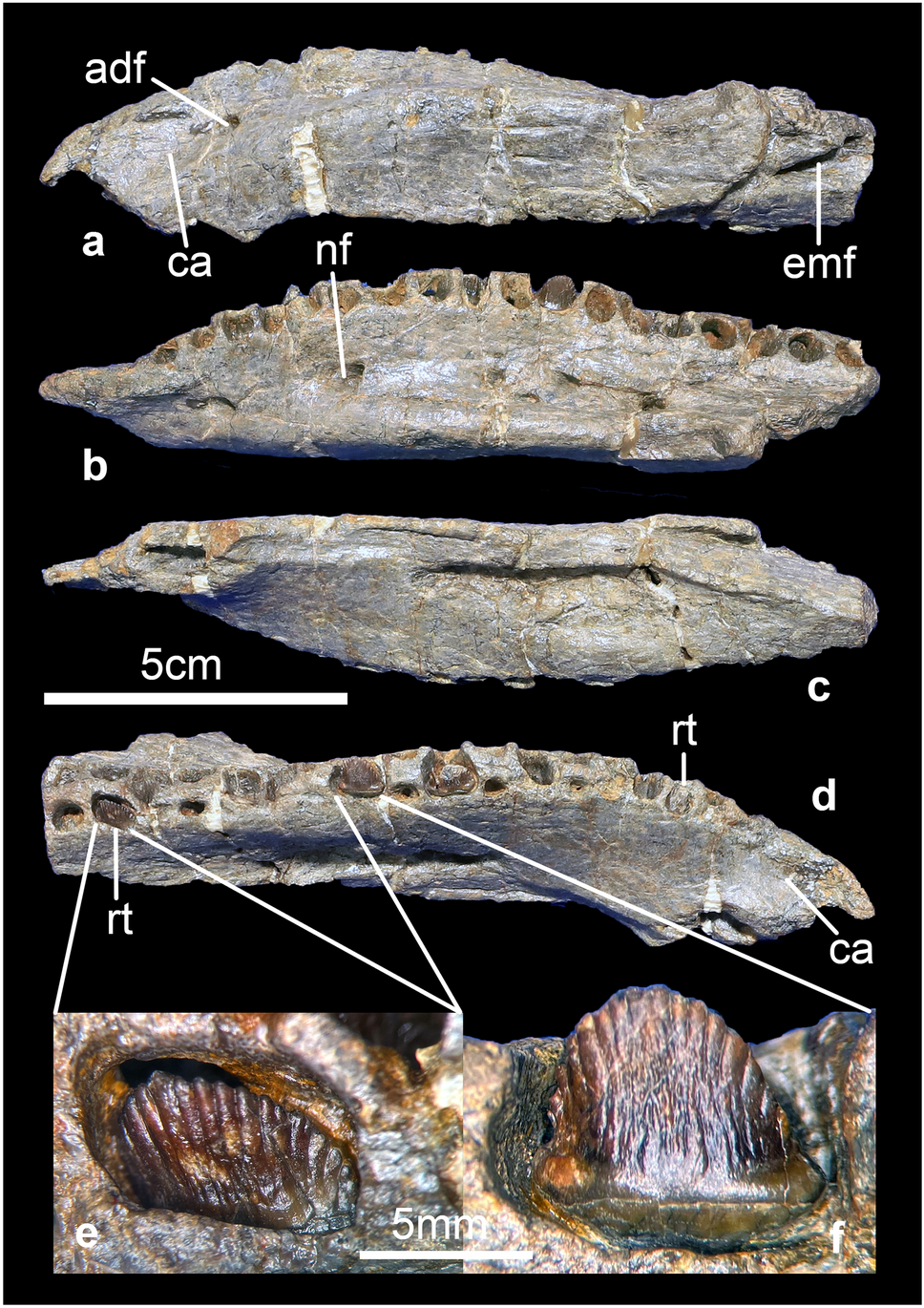
Skull bones (left) and dentary (right)

The paired frontals (large bones of the skull roof) are generally broad and shorter from front to back when compared to other stegosaurs besides Tuojiangosaurus. This shape is also similar to the basal non-stegosaurian thyreophorans Scelidosaurus and Emausaurus. The describing authors identified this structure of the frontal—being wider than long and contributing significantly to both the medial and anterior margins of the supratemporal fenestrae—as an autapomorphy (unique derived trait) of Baiyinosaurus.

The left dentary (tooth-bearing bone of the lower jaw) is largely complete. It curves down and inward at the front. While a predentary (lower beak bone) is not preserved, there are visible facets for it on both sides of the tip of the dentary. Similar to many basally-branching stegosaurs like Huayangosaurus, Gigantspinosaurus, and Kentrosaurus, the first dentary tooth is immediately behind the predentary, without the wide diastema (gap) present in later taxa like Stegosaurus and Jiangjunosaurus. The dentary preserves eighteen alveoli (tooth sockets), some of which have partially erupted teeth visible. For both of the two teeth that are entirely preserved, the crown shows two denticles at the tip and seven denticles on both the front and back edges. This might be the condition for all of the dentary teeth, although the number of denticles for some other stegosaur species varies depending on the side.

=== Postcranial skeleton ===
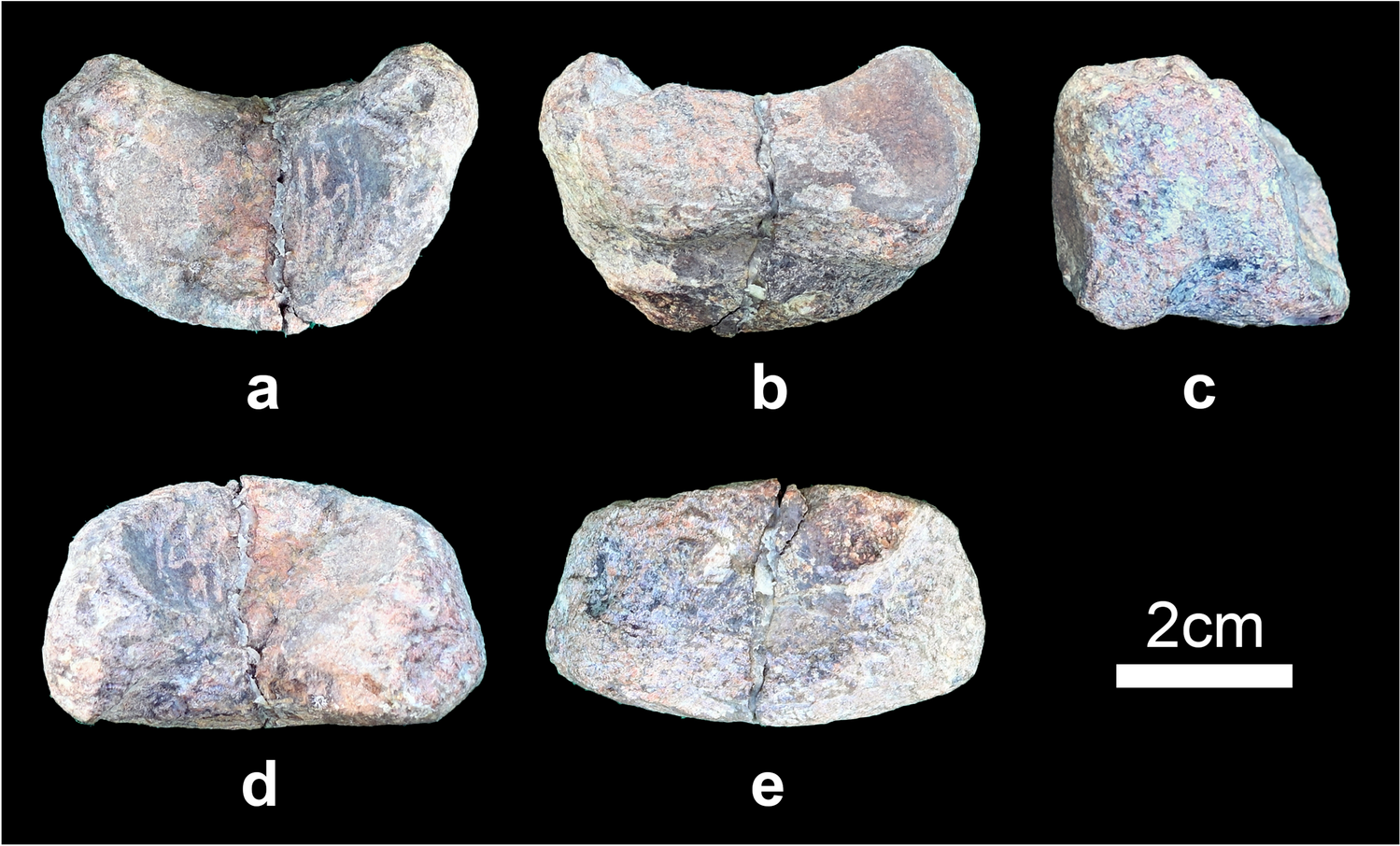
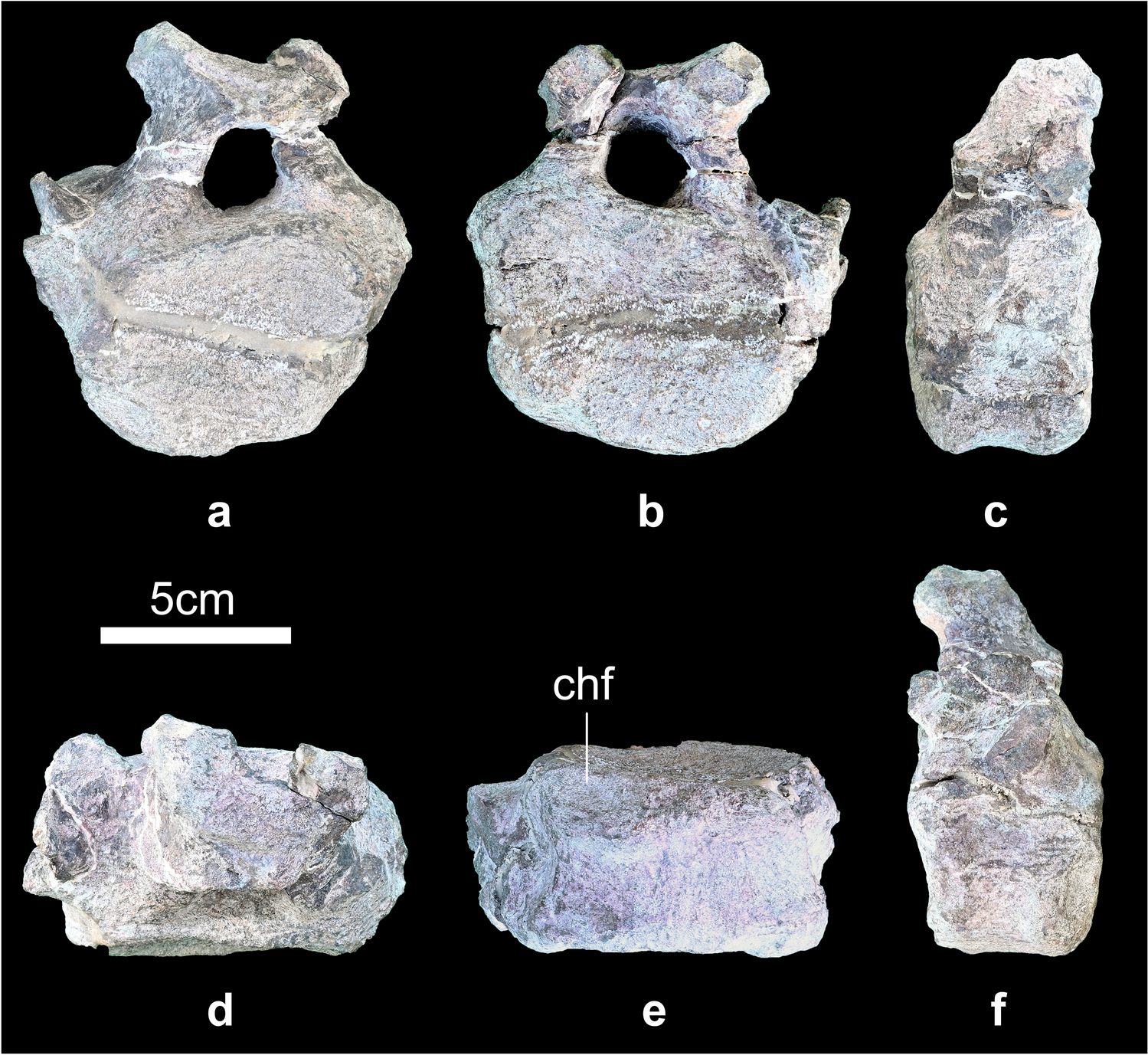
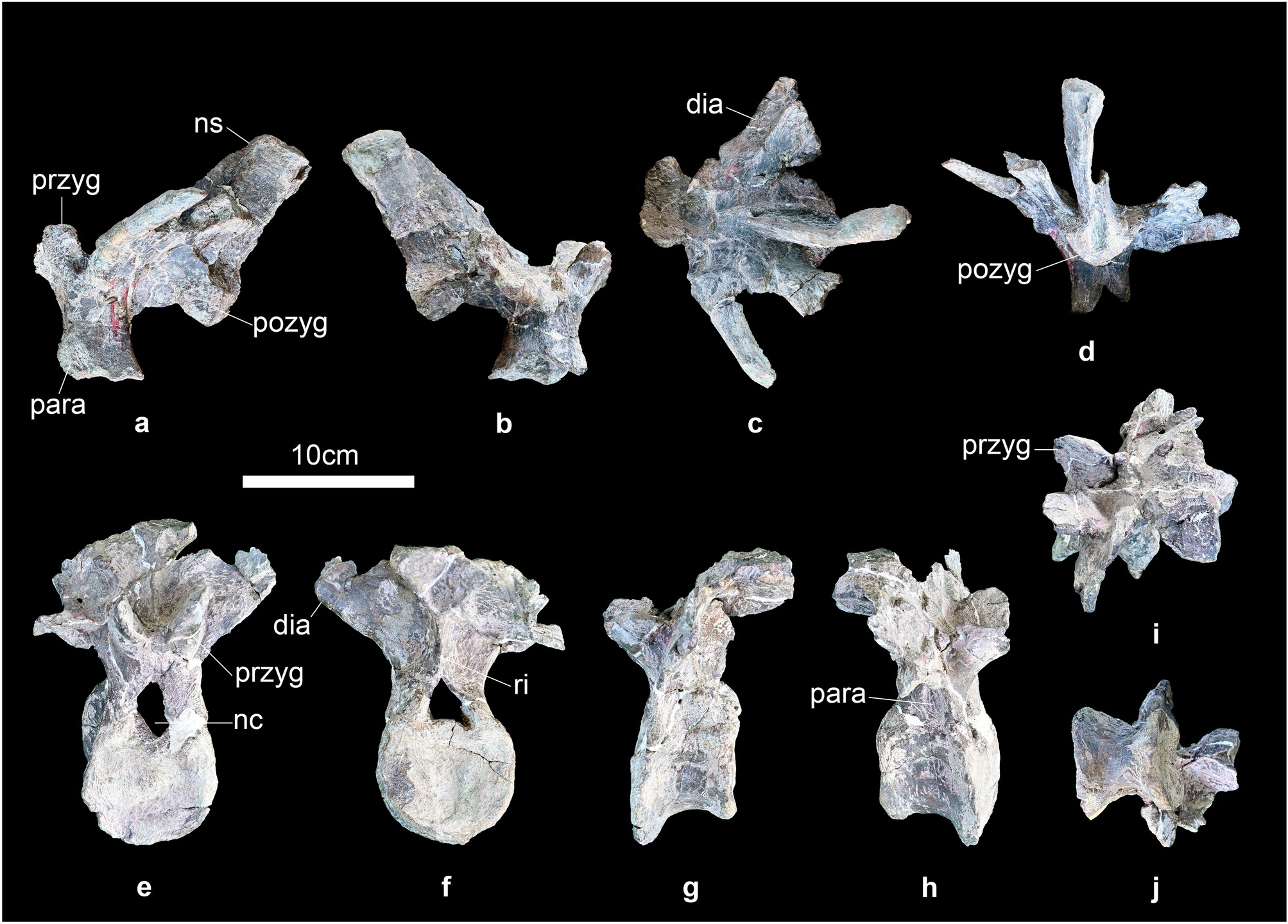
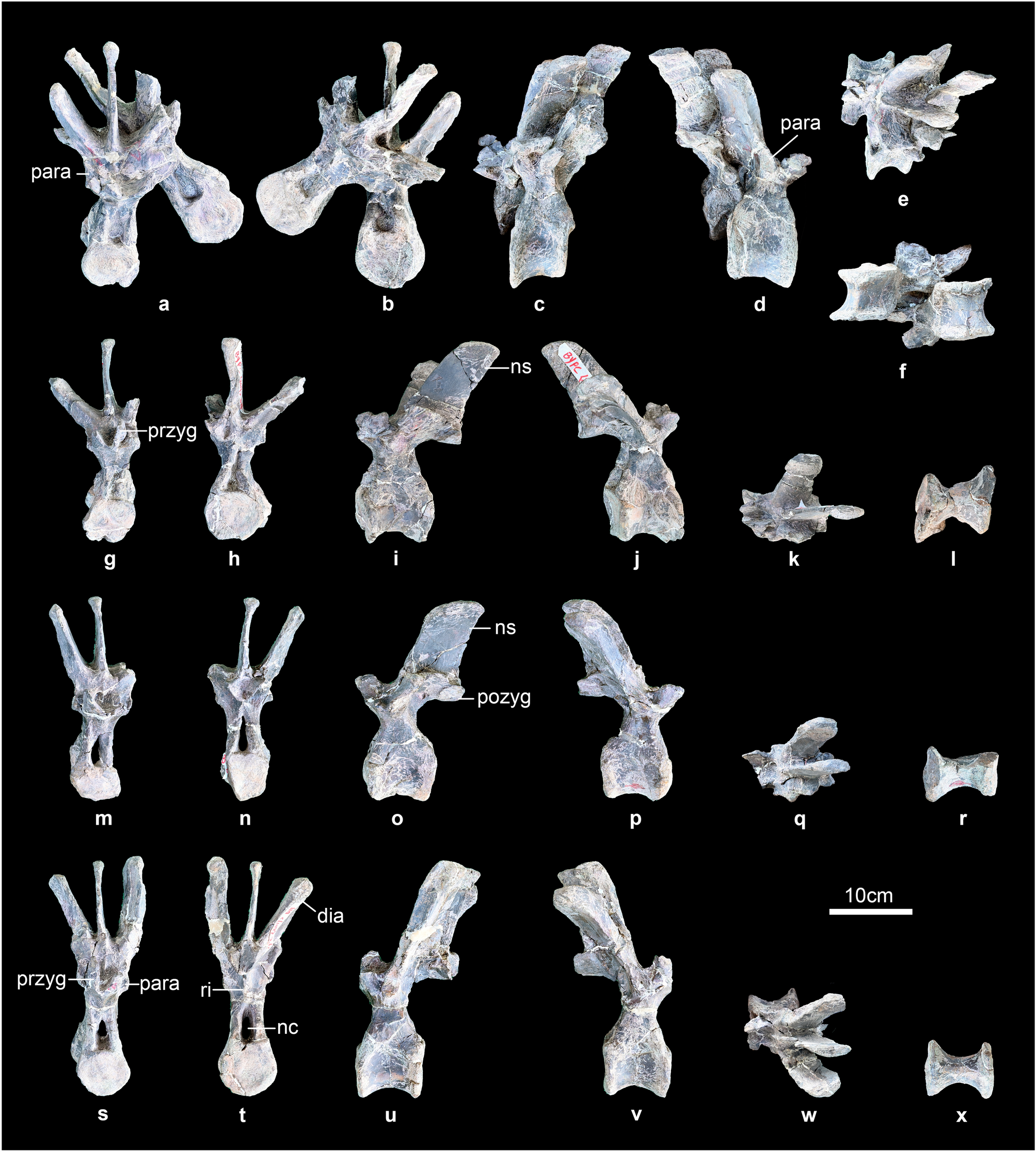
Atlas (top left), caudal vertebra (top right), and dorsal vertebrae (bottom)

The postcrania of Baiyinosaurus comprises only bones from the axial skeleton. No osteoderms are known. The intercentrum of the atlas (first cervical vertebra) is the only cervical vertebra preserved, and it notably lacks the two ridges seen on the underside in Stegosaurus.

The seven dorsal vertebrae (two anterior, five mid-posterior) have a typical combination of features. In most stegosaurs, the neural arches are very expanded dorsally, but like the more basal taxa Huayangosaurus and Gigantspinosaurus the arches are not significantly elongated. In the middle/posterior dorsals, the parapophyses (processes that articulate with the ribs) are elevated on short stalks, similar to the anatomy seen in Bashanosaurus and Scelidosaurus. The neural spines are comparatively broad from front to back in lateral view compared to other stegosaurs, but generally similar to Gigantspinosaurus and the non-stegosaurs Scelidosaurus, Laquintasaura and Lesothosaurus. The neural canal is ovate in cross-section.

One anterior caudal vertebra is known. It is missing the zygapophyses (articular processes) and neural spine. There is a facet for a chevron at the base of the centrum. The neural canal is round in cross-section.

== Classification ==
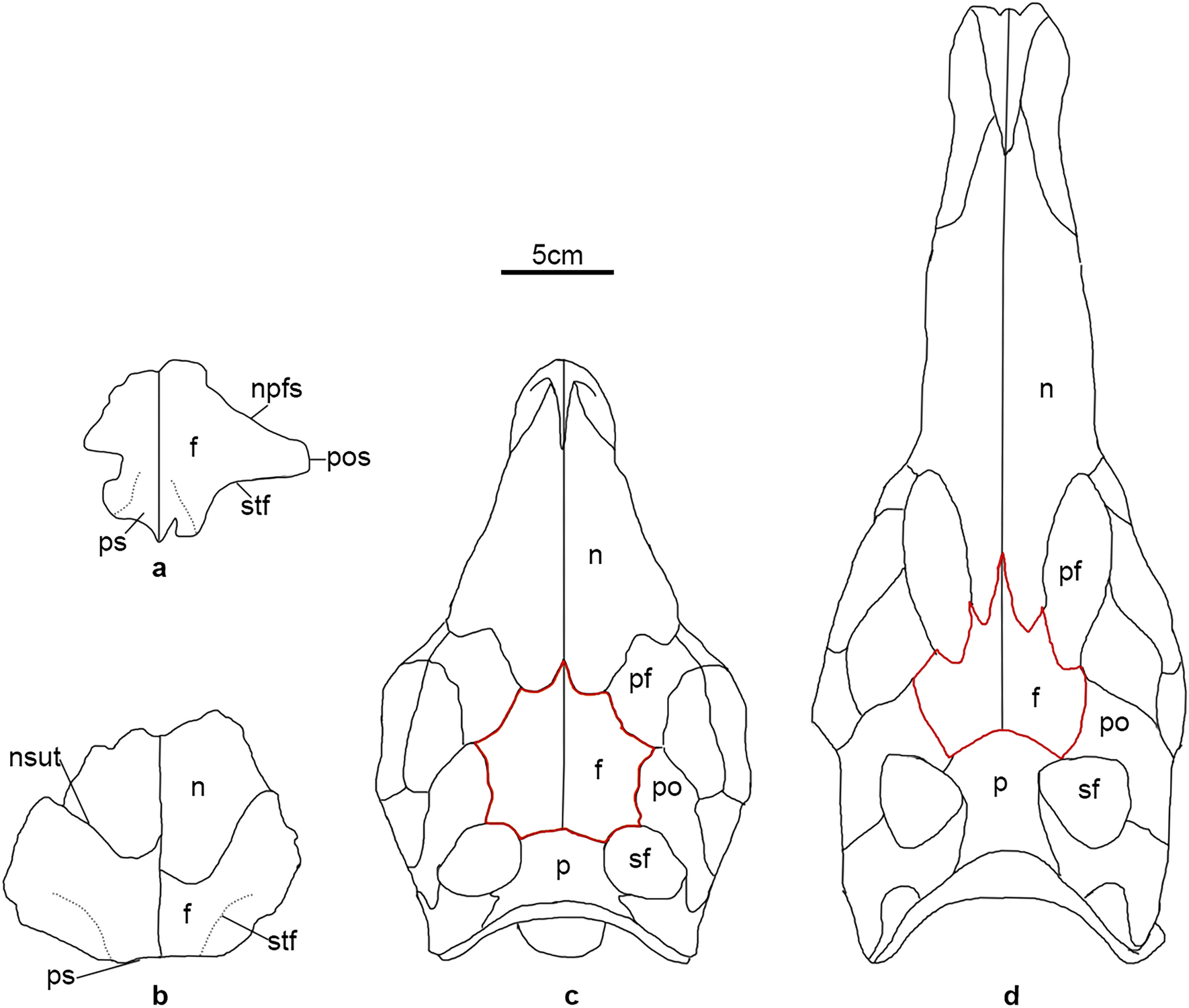
Comparison of the skull roof of several stegosaurs (Baiyinosaurus is A)

In their phylogenetic analyses, Ning et al. (2024) recovered Baiyinosaurus as an early member of the Stegosauria, in a clade with the slightly older Argentinian Isaberrysaura and the younger Chinese Gigantspinosaurus. Their results are displayed in the cladogram below:

- Stegosauria
  - Bashanosaurus
  - - Chungkingosaurus
    - - Huayangosaurus
      - - Tuojiangosaurus
        - - - Baiyinosaurus
            - Isaberrysaura
            - Gigantspinosaurus
          - - Alcovasaurus
            - - Jiangjunosaurus
              - - Kentrosaurus
                - - - Adratiklit
                    - Dacentrurus
                  - - - Hesperosaurus
                      - Miragaia
                    - - Loricatosaurus
                      - - Stegosaurus stenops
                        - Stegosaurus homheni (Wuerhosaurus)

== Paleoecology ==
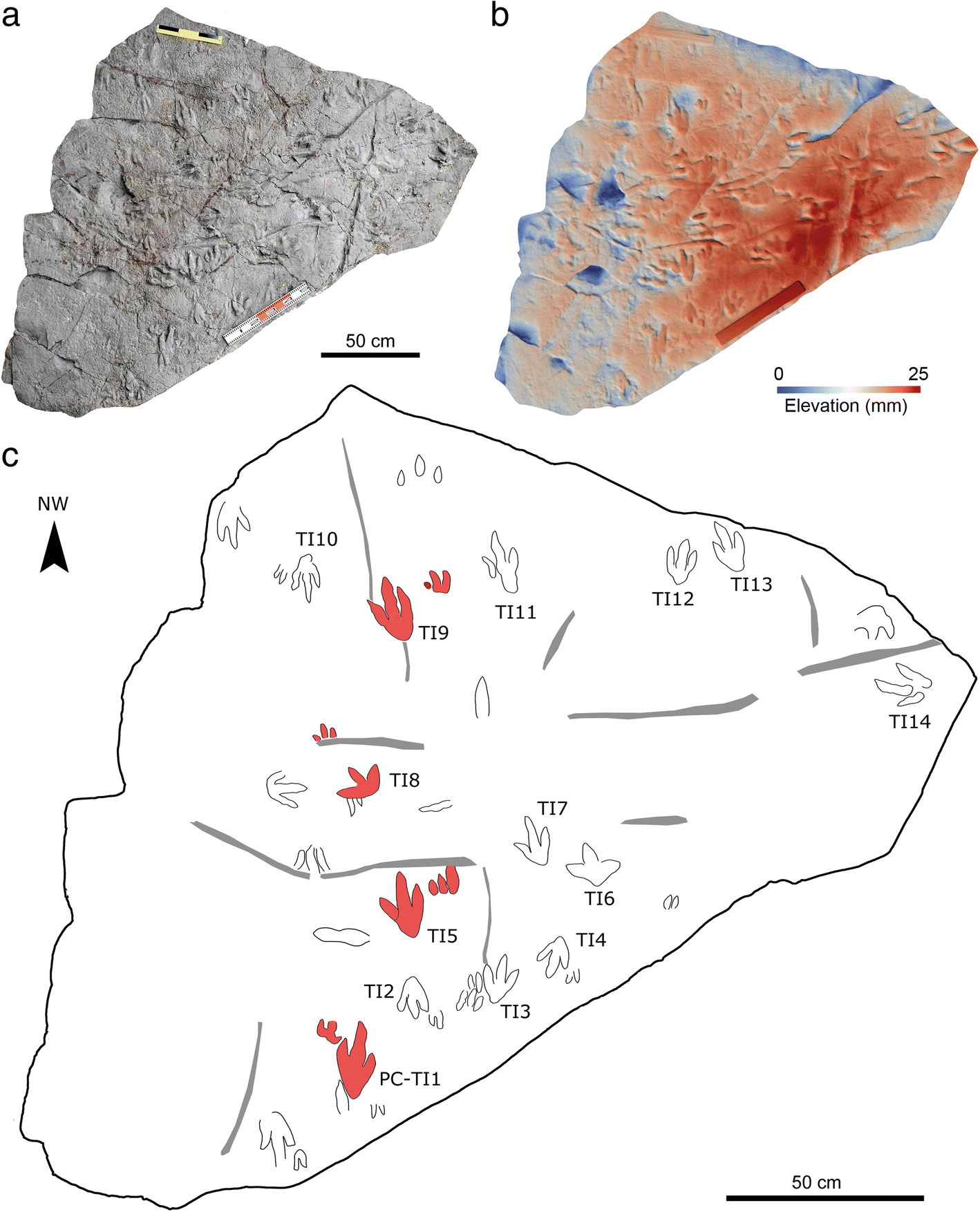
Assemblage of Grallator pingchuanensis theropod footprints from the Wangjiashan Formation

Baiyinosaurus is known from the Straw-yellow Sandstone Member of the Wangjiashan Formation, which dates to the late Bathonian age of the Middle Jurassic period. The remains of undescribed possible mamenchisaurid sauropods and large theropods (including teeth) were found nearby by the same expedition that discovered Baiyinosaurus, as well as trackways of theropod footprints assigned to the ichnogenus Grallator pingchuanensis. Some fossilized plants are also known from these outcrops.

== See also ==
- Timeline of stegosaur research
- 2024 in archosaur paleontology
