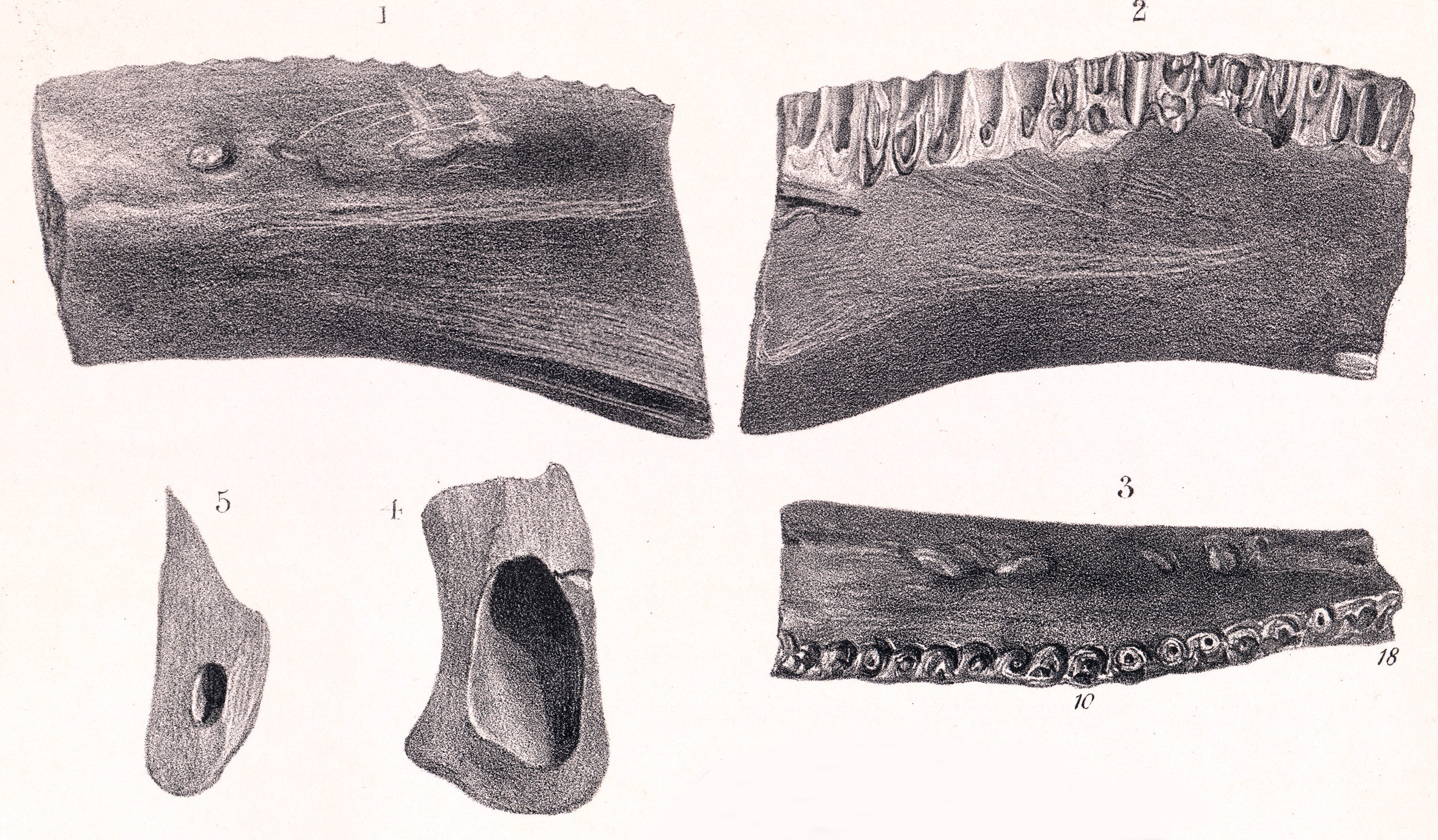
- Holotype jaw fragment

Scientific classification
- Kingdom: Animalia
- Phylum: Chordata
- Class: Reptilia
- Clade: Dinosauria
- Clade: †Ornithischia
- Clade: †Thyreophora
- Clade: †Stegosauria (?)
- Genus: †Regnosaurus; Mantell, 1848
- Species: †R. northamptoni

Binomial name
- †Regnosaurus northamptoni Mantell, 1848

Synonyms
- Craterosaurus? Seeley, 1874

= Regnosaurus =

Regnosaurus Temporal range: Early Cretaceous, ~Valanginian

Genus of thyreophoran dinosaurs

Regnosaurus (meaning "Sussex lizard") is an extinct genus of herbivorous presumably armored dinosaur known from the early Cretaceous Wealden Formation of England. The genus contains a single species, Regnosaurus northamptoni, known from a single partial jaw bone. Regnosaurus has traditionally been regarded as a stegosaur, possibly related to the Jurassic Huayangosaurus of China. Later research considers it to be a dubious, indeterminate thyreophoran.

== Discovery and species ==
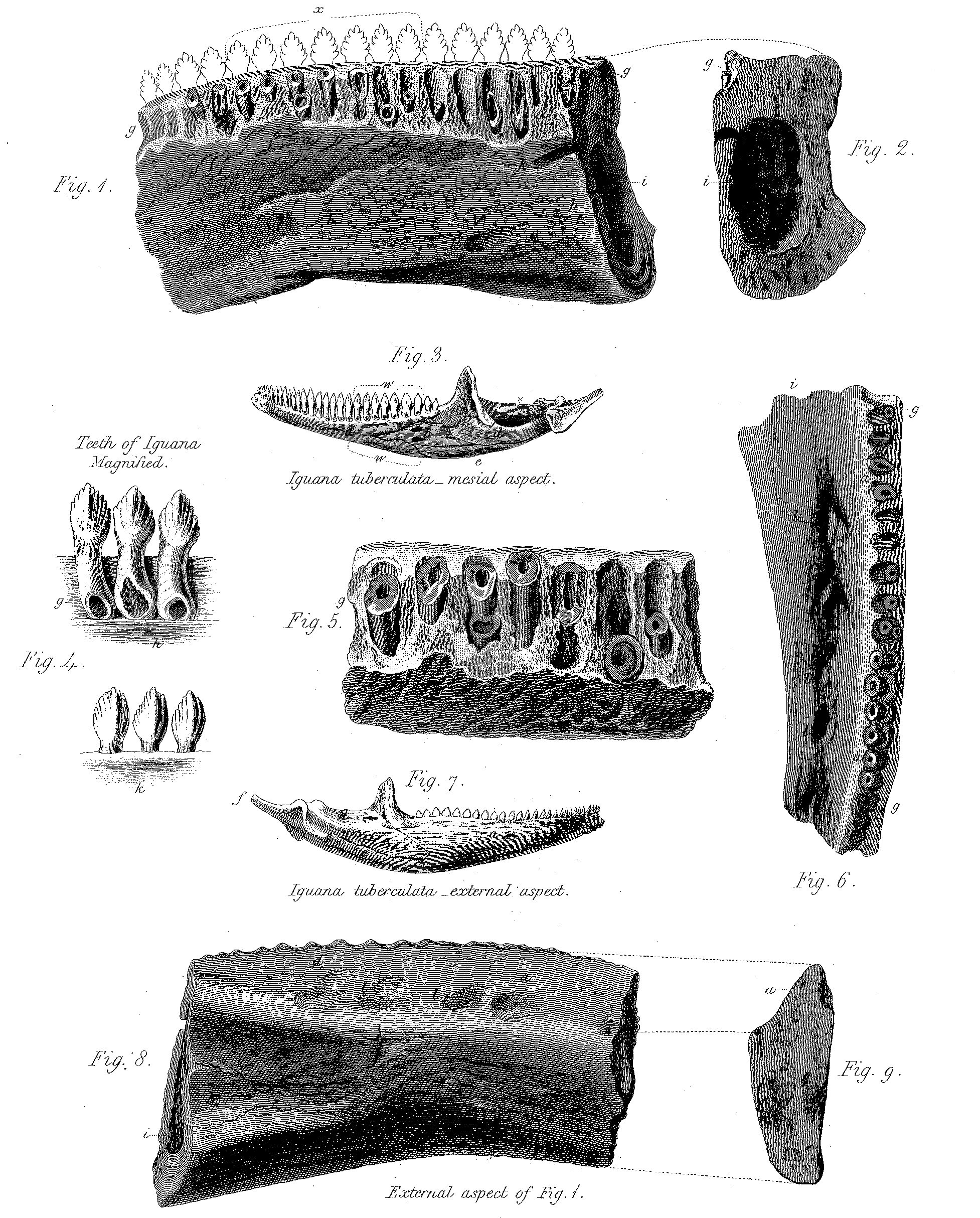
Jaw of Regnosaurus compared to that of an iguana

The fossil remains, a portion of the right lower jaw, were found near Cuckfield in Sussex, and made part of the collection of the British Museum of Natural History. In 1839, Gideon Mantell reported having noticed the fossil during a visit. Mantell soon concluded that the specimen represented the, until then unknown, lower jaw of his Iguanodon, probably that of a juvenile. On 8 February 1841, he presented it as such to the Royal Society. This interpretation was immediately challenged by Richard Owen, who felt that any proof of a connection was lacking. In 1848, after several real jaws of Iguanodon had been discovered, Mantell changed his position, concluding it was a related but different genus or subgenus, coining the name Regnosaurus Northamptoni. The generic name is derived from the Regni, a British tribe inhabiting Sussex. The specific name honours Spencer Compton, 2nd Marquess of Northampton, the president of the Royal Society, who was about to resign. By present conventions, the type species is written as Regnosaurus northamptoni.

Regnosaurus is definitely known only from the holotype specimen, BMNH 2422, a right mandibular (lower jaw) fragment. It consists of a third of the dentary and a part of the splenial, found in the Tunbridge Wells Sand Formation. The specimen is six inches long and bears fifteen tooth sockets. Some replacement teeth are visible. Other bone fragments have sometimes been referred to Regnosaurus, such as a fossil pubis recovered on the Isle of Wight, but as these are of other parts of the body and associated remains are lacking, the identity cannot be proven. The same is true for some dermal spikes reported by William Blows. Regnosaurus was probably a rather small animal, about 4 metres (13 feet) long.

The possibility of synonymy between Regnosaurus and Craterosaurus, an English Cretaceous stegosaur known only from a fragmentary vertebra, has been raised. However, researchers generally regard this as equivocal since the remains of both taxa can not be directly compared.

== Phylogeny ==
First seen as some iguanodontid, Regnosaurus was later connected to armoured dinosaurs. In 1888, Richard Lydekker assigned it to the Scelidosauridae. In 1909, Friedrich von Huene classified it in the stegosaurian Omosauridae, and in 1911, Alfred von Zittel assigned it to the Stegosauridae, but these groups then had different content and also included other armoured forms. In 1956, Alfred Romer synonymised it with Hylaeosaurus. An entirely different suggestion was made by John Ostrom, who surmised it might have been a sauropod.

The first to state that the Regnosaurus holotype was a stegosaurian in the modern sense was George Olshevsky in 1993. This was confirmed by Paul Barrett and Paul Upchurch in 1995 who concluded that it is a stegosaur similar to Huayangosaurus, due to unique characters shared in the jaws of both taxa. As the remains are so limited, subsequent research has regarded Regnosaurus as a nomen dubium. In 2008, Susannah Maidment, in addition to David Norman, Barrett, and Upchurch, determined the characters previously used to unite Regnosaurus and Huayangosaurus were not valid, being shared either by non-stegosaurine stegosaurs or thyreophorans more broadly. They concluded Regnosaurus should be regarded as a dubious indeterminate thyreophoran.

== See also ==
- Timeline of stegosaur research
