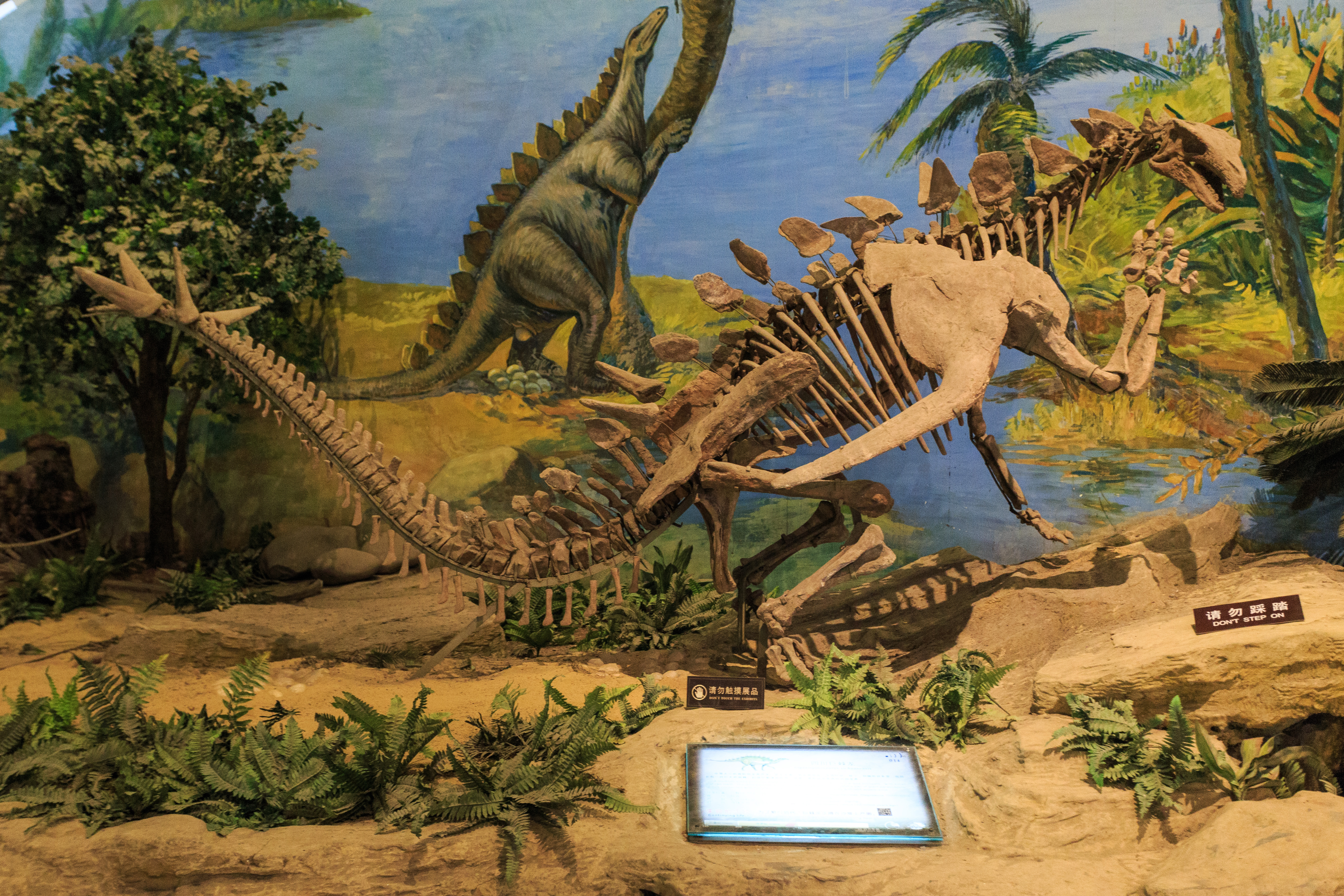
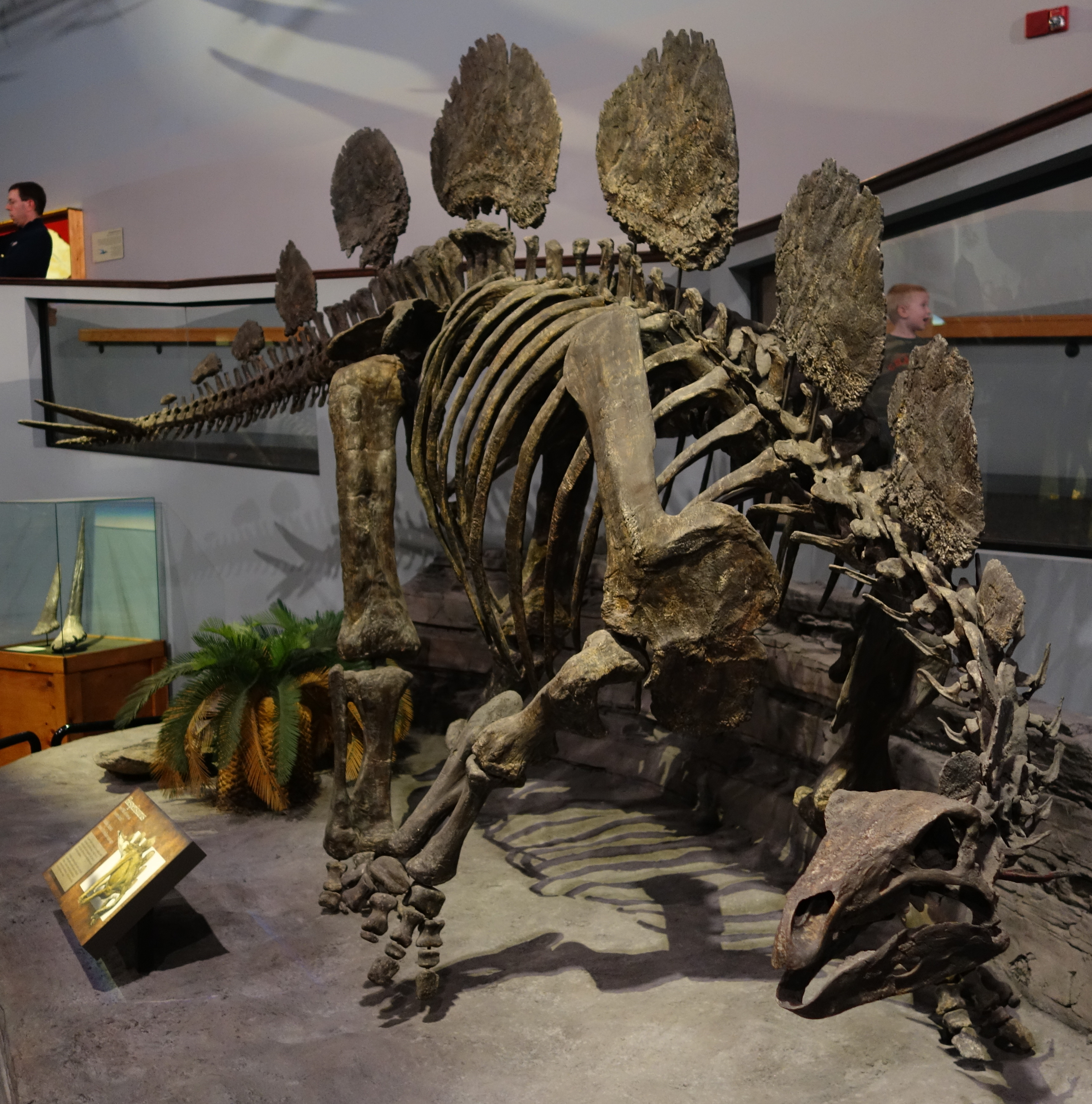
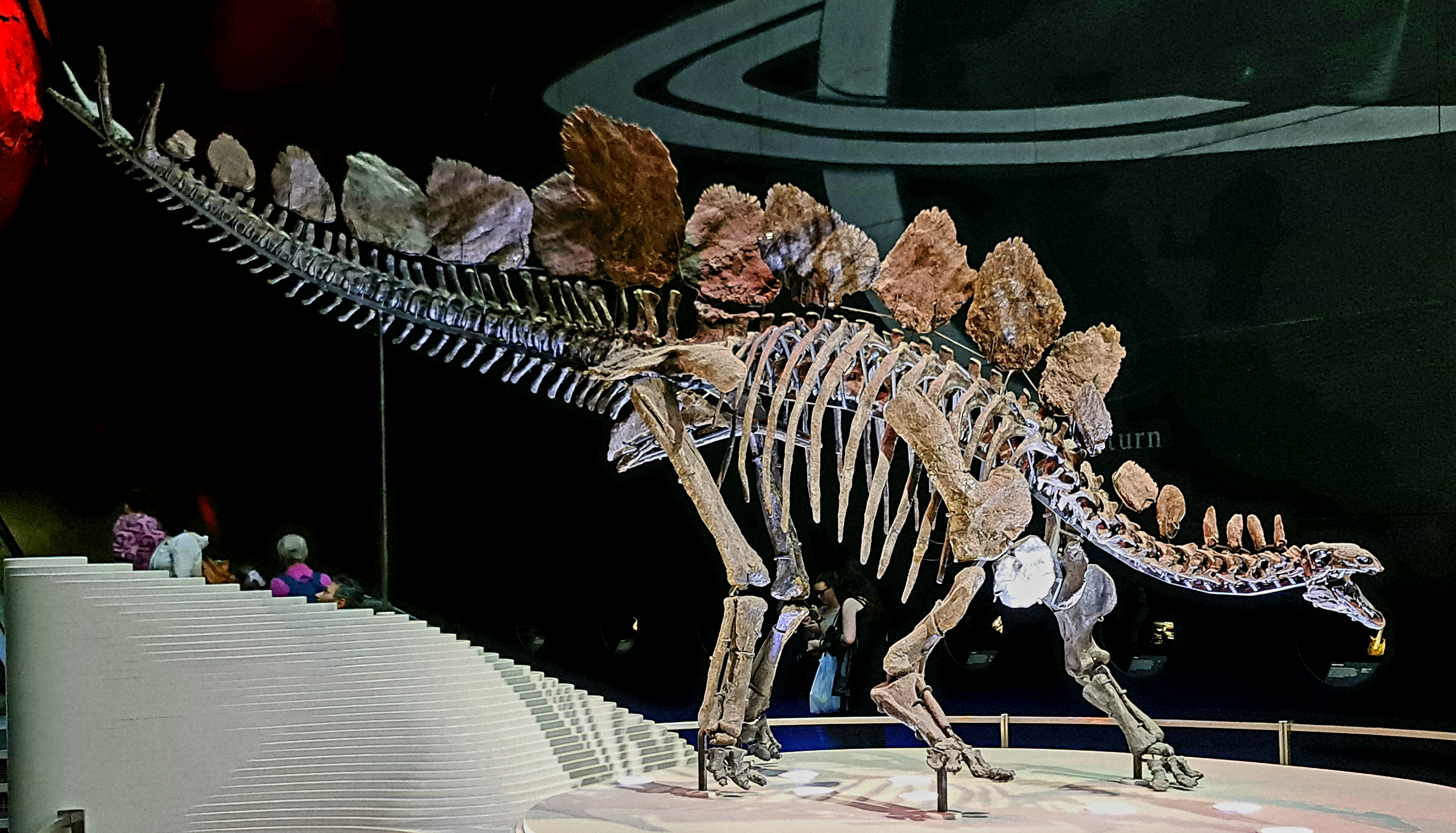
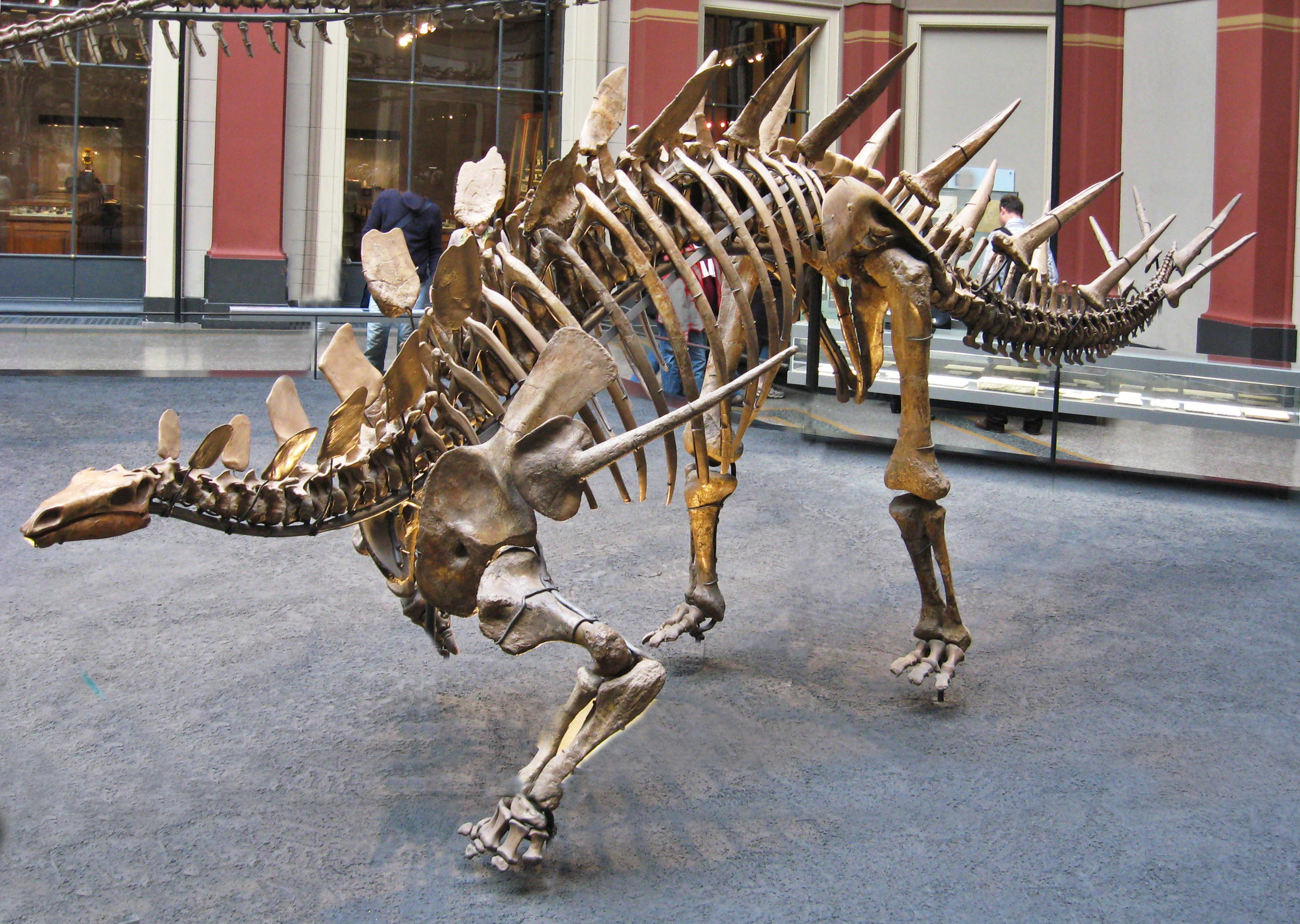
- Four stegosaurs. Clockwise from top left: Gigantspinosaurus, Hesperosaurus, Kentrosaurus, and Stegosaurus

Scientific classification
- Kingdom: Animalia
- Phylum: Chordata
- Class: Reptilia
- Clade: Dinosauria
- Clade: †Ornithischia
- Clade: †Thyreophora
- Clade: †Eurypoda
- Clade: †Stegosauria; Marsh, 1877

Subgroups
- †Craterosaurus; †Lexovisaurus; †Monkonosaurus; †Mongolostegus; †Regnosaurus?; †Huayangosauridae Dong, Tang, & Zhou, 1982; †Baiyinosaurus; †Bashanosaurus; †Chungkingosaurus?; †Gigantspinosaurus; †Huayangosaurus; †Isaberrysaura; †Stegosauridae Marsh, 1880; †Paranthodon; †Tuojiangosaurus; †Neostegosauria Sánchez-Fenollosa & Cobos, 2025; †Kentrosaurus; †Dacentrurinae Olshevsky & Ford emend Mateus et al., 2009; †Adratiklit; †Alcovasaurus; †Dacentrurus; †Miragaia; †Thyreosaurus; †Stegosaurinae Nopcsa, 1917; †Chialingosaurus; †Hesperosaurus; †Hypsirophus; †Jiangjunosaurus; †Loricatosaurus; †Stegosaurus; †Wuerhosaurus; †Yanbeilong; †Yingshanosaurus

= Stegosauria =

Stegosaurs Temporal range: Middle Jurassic–Early Cretaceous (Bajocian–Albian) Possible wider range based on ichnofossils and fragmentary elements

Extinct clade of armored dinosaurs

Stegosauria is a group of herbivorous ornithischian dinosaurs that lived during the Jurassic and early Cretaceous periods. Stegosaurian fossils have been found mostly in the Northern Hemisphere (North America, Europe and Asia), Africa and South America. Although their geographical origins are unclear, the earliest unequivocal stegosaurians are known from the Middle Jurassic (Bajocian-Bathonian stages), including Adratiklit, Bashanosaurus, Isaberrysaura and Thyreosaurus.

Stegosaurians belong to a clade of armored dinosaurs known as Thyreophora. Originally, they did not differ much from more basal (early-diverging) members of that group, being small, low-slung, running animals protected by armored scutes. An early evolutionary innovation was the development of spikes as defensive weapons. Later species were larger and developed long hindlimbs that no longer allowed them to run. This increased the importance of active defence by the thagomizer, which could ward off even large predators because the tail was in a higher position, pointing horizontally to the rear from the broad pelvis. Stegosaurs had complex arrays of spikes and plates running along their backs, hips and tails.

Stegosauria includes two families, the Huayangosauridae and the more diverse Stegosauridae. All species were quadrupedal herbivores with characteristic dorsal dermal plates. These large, thin, erect plates are thought to be aligned parasagittally from the neck to near the end of the tail. The end of the tail has pairs of spikes, sometimes referred to as a thagomizer. It may be that this is the only scientific term derived from a joke (in this case a The Far Side comic). Although defense, thermo-regulation, and display have been theorized to be the possible functions of these dorsal plates, a study of the ontogenetic histology of the plates and spikes suggests that the plates serve different functions at different stages of the stegosaurids' life histories. The terminal spikes in the tail are thought to have been used in old adults, at least, as a weapon for defence. However, the function of stegosaurid plates and spikes, at different life stages, still remains a matter of great debate.

The first stegosaurian finds in the early 19th century were fragmentary. Better fossil material, of the genus Dacentrurus, was discovered in 1874 in England. Soon after, in 1877, the first nearly complete skeleton was discovered in the United States. Professor Othniel Charles Marsh that year classified such specimens in the new genus Stegosaurus, from which the group acquired its name, and which is still by far the most famous stegosaurian. During the latter half of the twentieth century, many important Chinese finds were made, representing about half of the presently known diversity of stegosaurians.

== History of research ==
The first known discovery of a possible stegosaurian was probably made in the early nineteenth century in England. It consisted of a lower jaw fragment and was in 1848 named Regnosaurus. In 1845, in the area of the present state of South Africa, remains were discovered that much later would be named Paranthodon. In 1874, other remains from England were named Craterosaurus. All three taxa were based on fragmentary material and were not recognised as possible stegosaurians until the twentieth century. They gave no reason to suspect the existence of a new, distinctive group of dinosaurs.

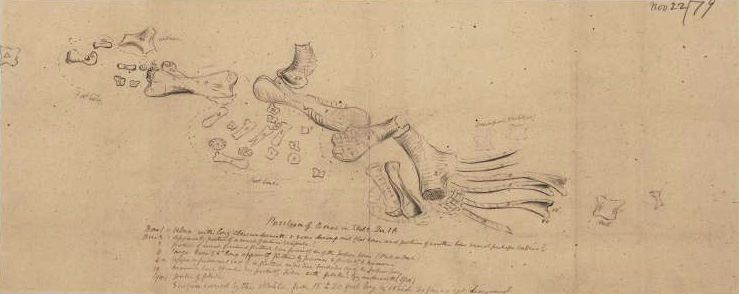
Stegosaurus bones illustrated by Arthur Lakes in 1879

In 1874, extensive remains of what was clearly a large herbivore equipped with spikes were uncovered in England; the first partial stegosaurian skeleton known. They were named Omosaurus by Richard Owen in 1875. Later, this name was shown to be preoccupied by the phytosaur Omosaurus and the stegosaurian was renamed Dacentrurus. Other English nineteenth-century and early twentieth-century finds would be assigned to Omosaurus; later they would, together with French fossils, be partly renamed Lexovisaurus and Loricatosaurus.

In 1877, Arthur Lakes, a fossil hunter working for Professor Othniel Charles Marsh in Wyoming, excavated a fossil that Marsh named Stegosaurus the same year. At first, Marsh still entertained some incorrect notions about its morphology. He assumed that the plates formed a flat skin cover—hence the name, meaning "roof saurian"—and that the animal was bipedal with the spikes sticking out sideways from the rear of the skull. A succession of additional discoveries from the Como Bluff sites allowed a quick update of the presumed build. In 1882, Marsh was able to publish the first skeletal reconstruction of a stegosaur. Hereby, stegosaurians became much better known to the general public. The American finds at the time represented the bulk of known stegosaurian fossils, with about twenty skeletons collected.

The next important discovery was made when a German expedition to the Tendaguru, then part of German East Africa, from 1909 to 1912 excavated over a thousand bones of Kentrosaurus. The finds increased the known variability of the group, Kentrosaurus being rather small and having long rows of spikes on the hip and tail.

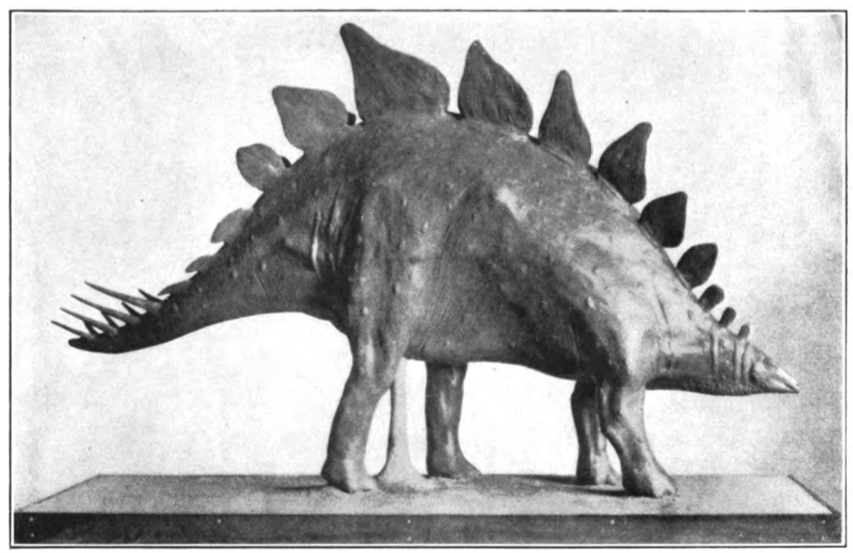
An early life restoration of a Stegosaurus from 1910

From the 1950s onwards, the geology of China was systematically surveyed in detail, and infrastructural works led to a vast increase of excavation in the PRC. This resulted in a new wave of Chinese stegosaurian discoveries, starting with Chialingosaurus in 1957. Chinese finds of the 1970s and 1980s included Wuerhosaurus, Tuojiangosaurus, Chungkingosaurus, Huayangosaurus, Yingshanosaurus and Gigantspinosaurus. This increased the age range of stegosaurian materials of good fossil preservation, as they represented the first relatively complete skeletons from the Middle Jurassic and the Early Cretaceous. Especially important was Huayangosaurus, which provided unique information about the early evolution of the group. In 2007, Jiangjunosaurus was reported, the first Chinese stegosaur named since 1994.

Towards the end of the twentieth century, the so-called dinosaur renaissance took place in which a vast increase in scientific attention was given to the Dinosauria. During the 1990s, European and North-American sites became productive again, with fossils such as Miragaia having been found in the Lourinhã Formation in Portugal, and a number of relatively complete Hesperosaurus skeletons having been excavated in Wyoming. Apart from the fossils per se, important new insights have been gained by applying the analytic method of cladistics, which allowed for precise calculations of interrelationships and the construction of stegosaurian phylogenetic trees.

== Description ==
Stegosaurids are distinguished from other stegosaurians in that the former have lost the plesiomorphic pre-maxillary teeth and lateral scute rows along the trunk. Furthermore, stegosaurids have long, narrow skulls and longer hindlimbs compared to their forelimbs. However, these two features are not diagnostic of Stegosauridae because they may also be present in non-stegosaurid stegosaurians.

=== Skull ===
Stegosaurians had characteristic small, long, flat, narrow heads and a horn-covered beak or rhamphotheca, which covered the front of the snout (two premaxillaries) and lower jaw (a single predentary) bones. Similar structures are seen in turtles and birds. Apart from Huayangosaurus, stegosaurians subsequently lost all premaxillary teeth within the upper beak. Huayangosaurus still had seven per side. The upper and lower jaws are equipped with rows of small teeth. Later species have a vertical bone plate covering the outer side of the lower jaw teeth. The structure of the upper jaw, with a low ridge above and running parallel to the tooth row, indicates the presence of a fleshy cheek. In stegosaurians, the typical archosaurian skull opening, the antorbital fenestra in front of the eye socket, is small, sometimes reduced to a narrow horizontal slit. In general, stegosaurids have proportionally long, low, and narrow snouts with a deep mandible, compared to that of Huayangosaurus. Stegosaurids also lack premaxillary teeth.

=== Postcranial skeleton ===
All stegosaurians are quadrupedal, with hoof-like toes on all four limbs. All stegosaurians after Huayangosaurus have forelimbs much shorter than their hindlimbs. Their hindlimbs are long and straight, designed to carry the weight of the animal while stepping. The condyles of the lower thighbone are short from the front to the rear. This would have limited the supported rotation of the knee joint, making running impossible. Huayangosaurus had a thighbone like a running animal. The upper leg was always longer than the lower leg.

Huayangosaurus had relatively long and slender arms. The forelimbs of later forms are very robust, with a massive humerus and ulna. The wrist bones were reinforced by a fusion into two blocks, an ulnar and a radial. The front feet of stegosaurians are commonly depicted in art and in museum displays with fingers splayed out and slanted downward. However, in this position, most bones in the hand would be disarticulated. In reality, the hand bones of stegosaurians were arranged into vertical columns, with the main fingers, oriented outwards, forming a tube-like structure. This is similar to the hands of sauropod dinosaurs, and is also supported by evidence from stegosaurian footprints and fossils found in a lifelike pose.

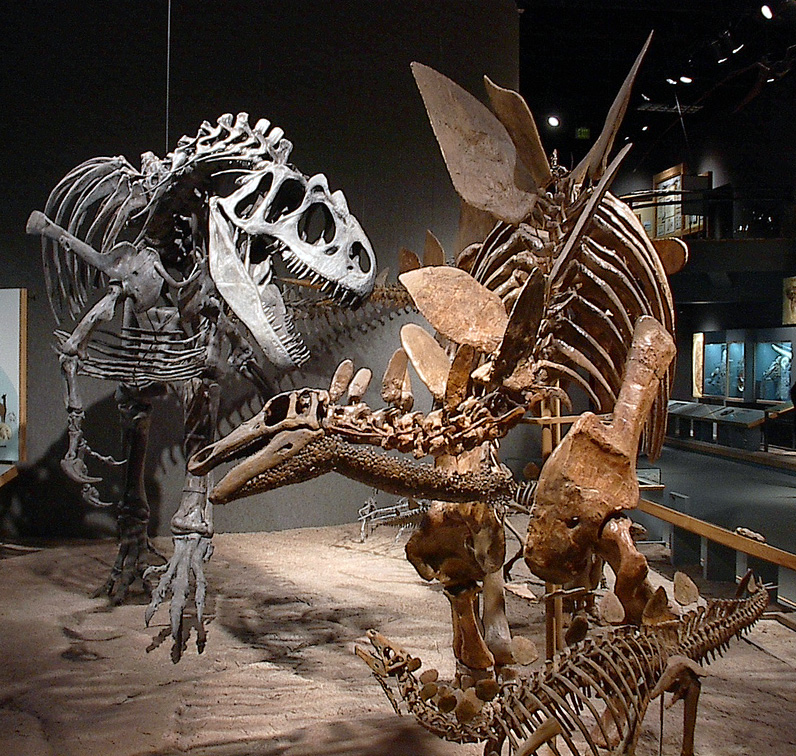
Stegosaurus mount showing the high neck posture, the throat ossicles and the robust shoulder girdle and forelimbs

The long hindlimbs elevated the tail base, such that the tail pointed out behind the animal almost horizontally from that high position. While walking, the tail would not have sloped downwards, as this would have impeded the function of the tail base retractor muscles, to pull the thighbones backwards. However, it has been suggested by Robert Thomas Bakker that stegosaurians could rear on their hind legs to reach higher layers of plants, the tail then being used as a "third leg". The mobility of the tail was increased by a reduction or absence of ossified tendons, which, in many ornithischians, stiffen the hip region. Huayangosaurus still possessed them. In species that had short forelimbs, the relatively short torso towards the front curved strongly downwards. The dorsal vertebrae typically were very high, with very tall neural arches and transverse processes pointing obliquely upwards to almost the level of the neural spine top. Stegosaurian back vertebrae can easily be identified by this unique configuration. The tall neural arches often house deep neural canals; enlarged canals in the sacral vertebrae have given rise to the incorrect notion of a "second brain". Despite the downwards curvature of the rump, the neck base was not very low, and the head was held a considerable distance off the ground. The neck was flexible and moderately long. Huayangosaurus still had the probably original number of nine cervical vertebrae; Miragaia has an elongated neck with seventeen.

The stegosaurian shoulder girdle was very robust. In Huayangosaurus, the acromion, a process on the lower front edge of the shoulderblade, was moderately developed; the coracoid was about as wide as the lower end of the scapula, with which it formed the shoulder joint. Later forms tend to have a strongly expanded acromion, while the coracoid, largely attached to the acromion, no longer extends to the rear lower corner of the scapula.

The stegosaurian pelvis was originally moderately large, as shown by Huayangosaurus. Later species, however, convergent to the Ankylosauria developed very broad pelves, in which the iliac bones formed wide horizontal plates with flaring front blades to allow for an enormous belly-gut. The ilia were attached to the sacral vertebrae via a sacral yoke formed by fused sacral ribs. Huayangosaurus still had rather long and obliquely oriented ischia and pubic bones. In more derived species, these became more horizontal and shorter to the rear, while the front prepubic process lengthened.

=== Armor and ornamention ===
Like all Thyreophora, stegosaurians were protected by bony scutes that were not part of the skeleton proper but skin ossifications instead: the so-called osteoderms. Huayangosaurus had several types. On its neck, back, and tail were two rows of paired small vertical plates and spikes. The very tail end bore a small club. Each flank had a row of smaller osteoderms, culminating in a long shoulder spine in front, curving to the rear. Later forms show very variable configurations, combining plates of various shapes and sizes on the neck and front torso with spikes more to the rear of the animal. They seem to have lost the tail club and the flank rows are apparently absent also, with the exception of the shoulder spine, still shown by Kentrosaurus and extremely developed, as its name indicates, in Gigantspinosaurus. As far as is known, all forms possessed some sort of thagomizer, though these are rarely preserved articulated, allowing for the establishment of the exact arrangement. A fossil of Chungkingosaurus sp. has been reported with three pairs of spikes pointing outwards and a fourth pair pointing to the rear. The most derived species, like Stegosaurus, Hesperosaurus and Wuerhosaurus, have very large and flat back plates. Stegosaurid plates have a thick base and central portion, but are transversely thin elsewhere. The plates become remarkably large and thin in Stegosaurus. They are found in varying sizes along the dorsum, with the central region of the back usually having the largest and tallest plates. The arrangement of these parasagittal dorsal plates has been intensely debated in the past. Discoverer Othniel Charles Marsh suggested a single median row of plates running post-cranially along the longitudinal axis and Lull argued in favour of bilaterally paired arrangement throughout the series. Current scientific consensus lies in the arrangement proposed by Gilmore: two parasagittal rows of staggered alternates, after the discovery of an almost complete skeleton preserved in this manner in rock. Furthermore, no two plates share the same size and shape, making the possibility of bilaterally paired rows even less likely. Plates are usually found with distinct vascular grooves on their lateral surfaces, suggesting the presence of a circulatory network. Stegosaurids also have osteoderms on the throat in the form of small, depressed ossicles and two pairs of elongated spike-like tail spines. With Stegosaurus fossils, ossicles have also been found in the throat region, bony skin discs that protected the lower neck.

Many stegosaurs, including Gigantspinosaurus and Kentrosaurus, have been discovered with parascapular spines, or spines emerging from the shoulder region, which project posteriorly out of the lower part of the shoulder plates. These spines are long, rounded, and comma-shaped in lateral view and have an enlarged base. Stegosaurids also lack lateral scute rows that run longitudinally on either side of the trunk in Huayangosaurus and ankylosaurs, indicating yet another secondary loss of a plesiomorphic character. However, the absence of lateral scutes as well as pre-maxillary teeth mentioned above are not specifically diagnostic of stegosaurids, since these features are also present in some other stegosaurians, whose phylogenetic relationships are unclear.

The discovery of an impression of the skin covering the dorsal plates has implications for all possible functions of stegosaurian plates. Christiansen and Tschopp (2010) found that the skin was smooth with long, parallel, shallow grooves indicating a keratinous structure covering the plates. The addition of beta-keratin, a strong protein, would indeed allow the plates to bear more weight, suggesting they may have been used for active defense. A keratinous covering would also allow greater surface area for the plates to be used as mating display structures, which could be potentially coloured like the beaks of modern birds. At the same time, this finding implies that the use of plates for thermo-regulation may be less likely because the keratinous covering would make heat transfer from the bone highly ineffective.

== Classification ==
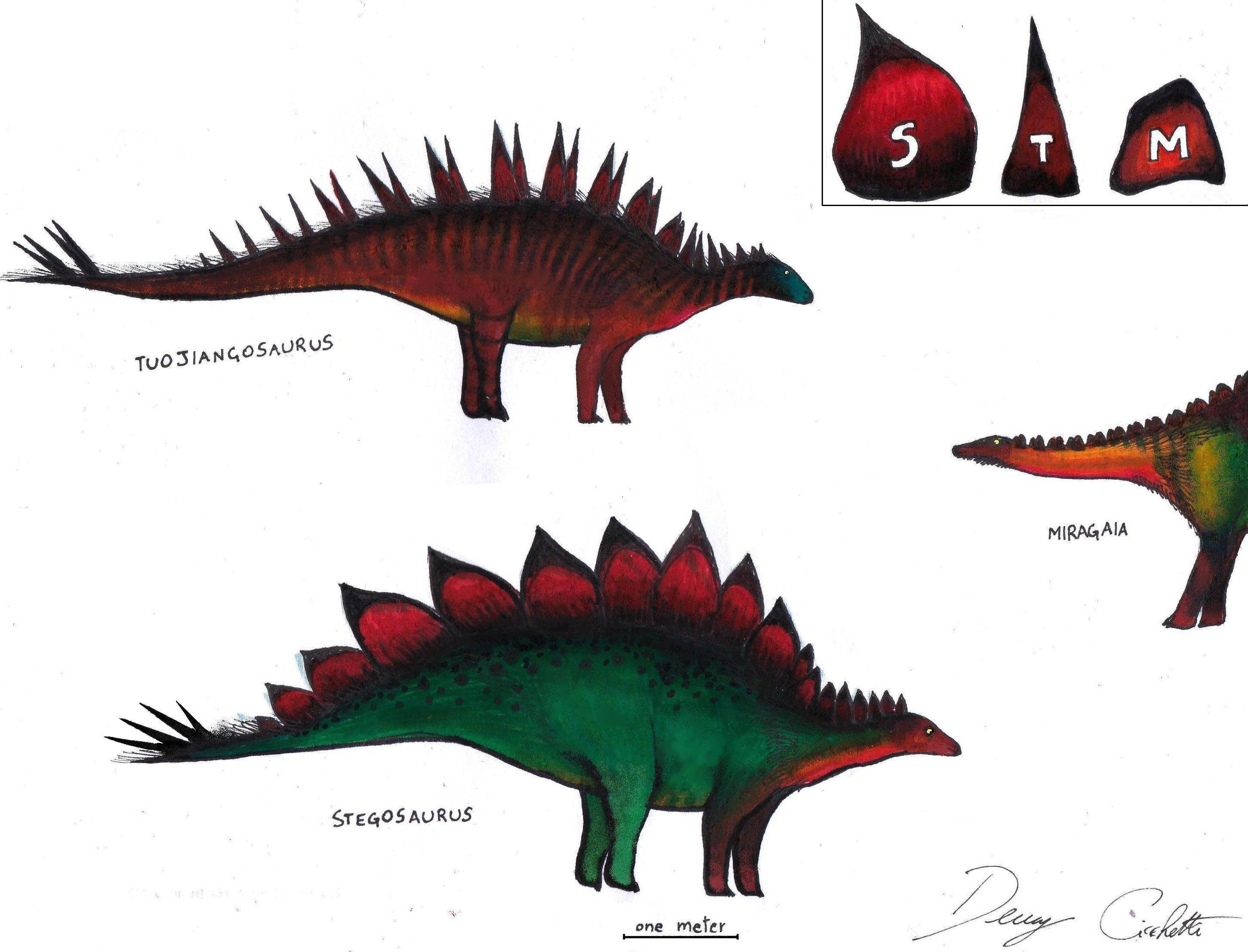
Illustration comparing three stegosaurs

In 1877, Othniel Marsh discovered and named Stegosaurus armatus, from which the name of the family 'Stegosauridae' was erected in 1880. In comparison to basal stegosaurians, notable synapomorphies of Stegosauridae include a large antitrochanter (supracetabular process) in the ilium, a long prepubic process, and long femur relative to the length of the humerus. Furthermore, stegosaurid sacral ribs are T-shaped in parasagittal cross-section and the dorsal vertebrae have an elongated neural arch. The first exact clade definition of Stegosauria was given by Peter Malcolm Galton in 1997: all thyreophoran Ornithischia more closely related to Stegosaurus than to Ankylosaurus. This definition was formalized in the PhyloCode by Daniel Madzia and colleagues in 2021 as "the largest clade containing Stegosaurus stenops, but not Ankylosaurus magniventris". Thus defined, the Stegosauria are by definition the sister group of the Ankylosauria within the Eurypoda. The vast majority of stegosaurian dinosaurs thus far recovered belong to the Stegosauridae, which lived in the later part of the Jurassic and early Cretaceous, and which were defined by Paul Sereno as all stegosaurians more closely related to Stegosaurus than to Huayangosaurus. This definition was also formalized in the PhyloCode by Daniel Madzia and colleagues in 2021 as "the largest clade containing Stegosaurus stenops, but not Huayangosaurus taibaii". They include per definition the well-known Stegosaurus. This group is widespread, with members across the Northern Hemisphere, Africa and South America.

Huayangosauridae (derived from Huayangosaurus, "Huayang reptile") is a family of stegosaurian dinosaurs from the Jurassic of China. The group is defined as all taxa closer to the namesake genus Huayangosaurus than Stegosaurus, and was originally named as the family Huayangosaurinae by Dong Zhiming and colleagues in the description of Huayangosaurus. Huayangosaurinae was originally differentiated by the remaining taxa within Stegosauridae by the presence of teeth in the premaxilla, an antorbital fenestra, and a mandibular fenestra. Huayangosaurinae, known from the Middle Jurassic of the Shaximiao Formation, was proposed to be intermediate between Scelidosaurinae and Stegosaurinae, suggesting that the origins of stegosaurs lay in Asia. Following phylogenetic analyses, Huayangosauridae was expanded to also include the taxon Chungkingosaurus, known from specimens from younger Late Jurassic deposits of the Shaximiao Formation. Huayangosauridae is either the sister taxon to all other stegosaurs, or close to the origin of the clade, with taxa like Gigantspinosaurus or Isaberrysaura outside the Stegosauridae-Huayangosauridae split. Huayangosauridae was formally defined in 2021 by Daniel Madzia and colleagues, who used the previous definitions of all taxa closer to Huayangosaurus taibaii than Stegosaurus stenops.

In 2017, Raven and Maidment published a comprehensive phylogenetic framework including most valid stegosaurian genera. Several subsequent publications expanded and corrected this matrix based on novel taxa and revised anatomical interpretations. In 2025, Sánchez-Fenollosa & Cobos compiled these variations and other observations into an updated and expanded dataset. The authors further coined the name Neostegosauria for the clade comprising the Dacentrurinae (including Kentrosaurus) and the Stegosaurinae. These results are displayed in the cladogram below:

- Eurypoda
  - Ankylosauria
  - Stegosauria
    - Huayangosauridae
      - Isaberrysaura
      - - - Bashanosaurus
          - Huayangosaurus
        - - Baiyinosaurus
          - Gigantspinosaurus
    - Stegosauridae
      - Chungkingosaurus
      - - - Tuojiangosaurus
          - Paranthodon
        - Neostegosauria
          - Dacentrurinae
            - Alcovasaurus
            - - Kentrosaurus
              - - Thyreosaurus
                - - Adratiklit
                  - Dacentrurus
                    (including Miragaia)
          - Stegosaurinae
            - - - Qigu Formation stegosaur
                - Loricatosaurus
              - - Hesperosaurus
                - Stegosaurus stenops
            - - Jiangjunosaurus
              - - Hekou Group stegosaur
                - - Wuerhosaurus homheni
                  - Yanbeilong

=== Undescribed species ===
To date, several genera from China bearing names have been proposed but not formally described, including "Changdusaurus". Until formal descriptions are published, these genera are regarded as nomina nuda.

=== Evolutionary history ===
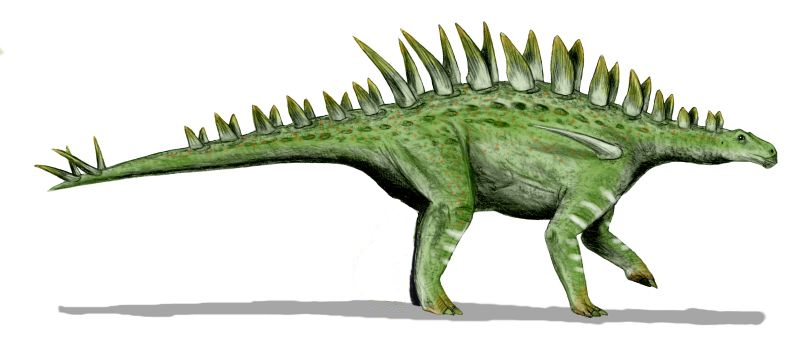
Huayangosaurus is among the oldest known stegosaurians for which good material is known, giving an impression of the build of the earliest members of the group

Like the spikes and shields of ankylosaurs, the bony plates and spines of stegosaurians evolved from the low-keeled osteoderms characteristic of basal thyreophorans. One such described genus, Scelidosaurus, is proposed to be morphologically close to the last common ancestor of the clade uniting stegosaurians and ankylosaurians, the Eurypoda. Galton (2019) interpreted plates of an armored dinosaur from the Lower Jurassic (Sinemurian-Pliensbachian) Lower Kota Formation of India as fossils of a member of Ankylosauria; the author argued that this finding indicates a probable early Early Jurassic origin for both Ankylosauria and its sister group Stegosauria. Footprints attributed to the ichnotaxon Deltapodus brodricki from the Middle Jurassic (Aalenian) of England represent the oldest probable record of stegosaurians reported so far. Outside that, there are assigned fossils to stegosauria from the Toarcian: the specimen "IVPP V.219", a chimaera with bones of the sauropod Sanpasaurus is known from the Maanshan Member of the Ziliujing Formation. The earliest possible trackways of stegosaurians are discovered from the Hettangian-aged deposits of France, indicating a possibly earlier origin. The perhaps most basal known stegosaurian, the four-metre-long Huayangosaurus, is still close to Scelidosaurus in build, with a higher and shorter skull, a short neck, a low torso, long slender forelimbs, short hindlimbs, large condyles on the thighbone, a narrow pelvis, long ischial and pubic shafts, and a relatively long tail. Its small tail club might be a eurypodan synapomorphy. Huayangosaurus lived during the Bathonian stage of the Middle Jurassic, about 166 million years ago.

A few million years later, during the Callovian-Oxfordian, from China much larger species are known, with long, "graviportal" (adapted for moving only in a slow manner on land due to a high body weight) hindlimbs: Chungkingosaurus, Chialingosaurus, Tuojiangosaurus and Gigantspinosaurus. Most of these are considered members of the derived Stegosauridae. Lexovisaurus and Loricatosaurus, stegosaurid finds from England and France of approximately equivalent age to the Chinese specimens, are likely the same taxon. During the Late Jurassic, stegosaurids seem to have experienced their greatest radiation. In Europe, Dacentrurus and the closely related Miragaia were present, while they are represented in Asia by Jiangjunosaurus. While older finds had been limited to the northern continents, in this phase, Gondwana was also colonised as shown by Kentrosaurus living in Africa. The most derived Jurassic stegosaurians are known from North-America: Stegosaurus (perhaps several species thereof) and the somewhat older Hesperosaurus. Stegosaurus was quite large (some specimens indicate a length of at least seven metres), had high plates, no shoulder spine, and a short, deep rump.

From the Early Cretaceous, far fewer finds are known, and it seems that the group had declined in diversity. Some fragmentary fossils have been described, such as Craterosaurus from England, Paranthodon from South Africa, and indeterminate remains from the Late Jurassic Cañadón Calcáreo Formation of Argentina. Up until recently, the only substantial discoveries were those of Wuerhosaurus from Northern China, the exact age of which is highly uncertain More recent discoveries from Asia however would later begin to fill out the Early Cretaceous diversity of the group. Indeterminate stegosaurs are known from the Early Cretaceous of Siberia, including the Ilek Formation and Batylykh Formation. The youngest known definitive remains of stegosaurs are those of Mongolostegus from Mongolia, a stegosaurine from the Hekou Group of China, and Yanbeilong of the Zuoyun Formation of China, all of which date to the Aptian-Albian.

It has often been suggested that the decline in stegosaur diversity was part of a Jurassic-Cretaceous transition, where angiosperms became the dominant plants, causing a faunal turnover where new groups of herbivores evolved. Although in general the case for such a causal relation is poorly supported by the data, stegosaurians are an exception in that their decline coincides with that of the Cycadophyta.

Though Late Cretaceous stegosaurian fossils have been reported, these have mostly turned out to be misidentified. A well-known example is Dravidosaurus, known from Coniacian fossils found in India. Though originally thought to be stegosaurian, in 1991 these badly-eroded fossils were suggested to instead have been based on plesiosaurian pelvis and hindlimb material, and none of the fossils are demonstrably stegosaurian. The reinterpretation of Dravidosaurus as a plesiosaur wasn't accepted by Galton and Upchurch (2004), who stated that the skull and plates of Dravidosaurus are certainly not plesiosaurian, and noted the need to redescribe the fossil material of Dravidosaurus. A purported stegosaurian dermal plate was reported from the latest Cretaceous (Maastrichtian) Kallamedu Formation (southern India); however, Galton & Ayyasami (2017) interpreted the specimen as a bone of a sauropod dinosaur. Nevertheless, the authors considered the survival of stegosaurians into the Maastrichtian to be possible, noting the presence of the stegosaurian ichnotaxon Deltapodus in the Maastrichtian Lameta Formation (western India). Furthermore, Ayyasami announced that he was in the process of working on new undescribed and likely stegosaurian bones from the original discovery site of the Dravidosaurus fossils.

== Paleobiology ==
=== Plate function ===
In an ontogenetic histological analysis of Stegosaurus plates and spikes, Hayashi et al. (2012) examined their structure and function through juveniles to old adults. They found that throughout the ontogeny, the dorsal osteoderms are composed of dense ossified collagen fibres in both the cortical and cancellous sections of the bone, suggesting that plates and spikes are formed from the direct mineralization of already existing fibrous networks in the skin. However, the many structural features, seen in the spikes and plates of old adult specimens, are acquired at different stages of development. Extensive vascular networks form in the plates during the change from juveniles to young adults and persist in old adults, but spikes acquire a thick cortex with a large axial vascular channel only in old adults. Hayashi et al. argue that the formation of nourishing vascular networks in young adults supported the growth of large plates. This would have enhanced the size of the animal, which may have helped attract mates and deter rivals. Furthermore, the presence of the vascular networks in the plates of the young adult indicates a secondary use of the plates as a thermoregulatory device for heat loss, much like the elephant ear, toucan bill, or alligator osteoderms. The thickening of the cortical section of the bone and the compaction of bone in the terminal tail-spikes in old adults suggest that they were used as defence weapons, but not until an ontogenetically late stage. The development of the large axial channel in old adults from small canals in young adults facilitated the further enlargement of the spikes by increasing the amount of nourishment supplied. On the other hand, plates do not show a similar degree of bone compaction or cortical thickening, indicating they would not be capable of taking much weight from above. This suggests they were not as important as spikes in active defense.

The protective nature of dorsal plates has also been questioned in the past; Davitashvili (1961) noted that the narrow dorsal location of the plates still left the sides vulnerable. Since the pattern of plates and spines varies between species, he suggested it could be important for intraspecific recognition and as a display for sexual selection. This is corroborated by Spassov's (1982) observations that the plates are arranged for maximum visible effect when viewed laterally during non-aggressive agonistic behaviour, as opposed to from a head-on aggressive stance.

=== Trace fossils ===
Stegosaurian tracks were first recognized in 1996 from a hindprint-only trackway discovered at the Cleveland-Lloyd quarry, which is located near Price, Utah. Two years later, a new ichnogenus called Stegopodus was erected for another set of stegosaurian tracks which were found near Arches National Park, also in Utah. Unlike the first, this trackway preserved traces of the forefeet. Fossil remains indicate that stegosaurians have five digits on the forefeet and three weight-bearing digits on the hind feet. From this, scientists were able to predict the appearance of stegosaurian tracks in 1990, six years in advance of the first actual discovery of Morrison stegosaurian tracks. More trackways have been found since the erection of Stegopodus. None, however, have preserved traces of the front feet, and stegosaurian traces remain rare.

Deltapodus is an ichnogenus attributed as stegosaurian prints, and are known across Europe, North Africa, and China. One Deltapodus footprint measures less than 6 cm in length and represents the smallest known stegosaurian track. Some tracks preserve exquisite scaly skin pattern.

Australia's 'Dinosaur Coast' in Broome, Western Australia, includes tracks of several different thyreophoran track-makers. Of these, the ichnogenus Garbina (a Nyulnyulan word for 'shield') and Luluichnus (honours the late Paddy Roe, OAM who went by the name 'Lulu') have been considered registered by stegosaurs. Garbina includes the largest stegosaur tracks measuring 80 cm in length. Trackway data show Garbina track-makers were capable of bipedal and quadrupedal progression, suggesting an adaptation to facultative bipedalism amongst some stegosaurs.

While has no body fossil evidence currently known for stegosaurs, handprints from underground coal mines near Oakey, Queensland, resembling Garbina tracks suggests their occurrence in this country from at least the Middle to Upper Jurassic (Callovian–Tithonian). A single plaster cast of one of these handprints is in the collections of the Queensland Museum.

=== Tail spikes ===
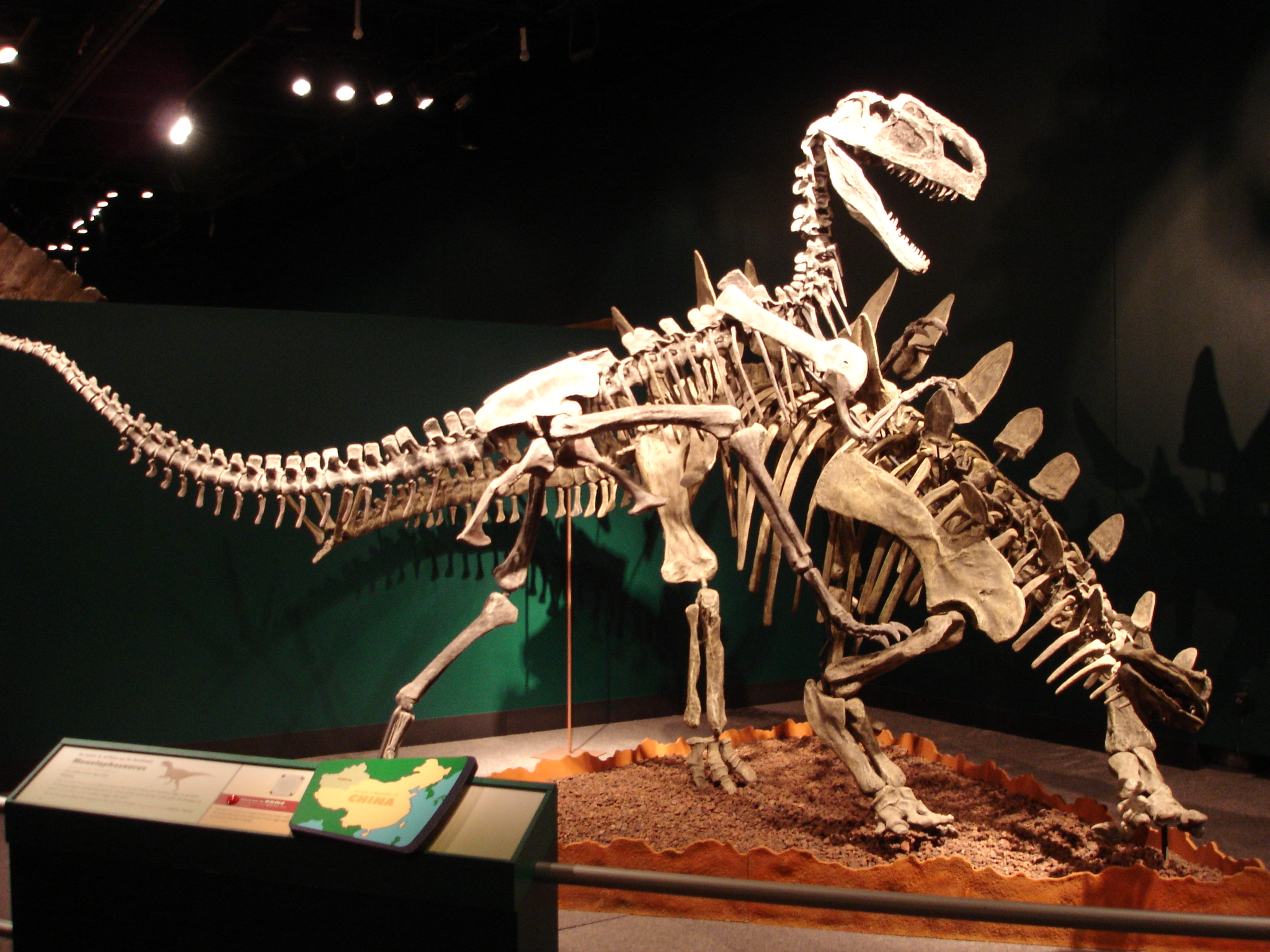
Mounted skeleton reconstruction of the stegosaur (Tuojiangosaurus) with a mid-sized theropod (Monolophosaurus), Field Museum in Chicago

There has been debate about whether the spikes were used simply for display, as posited by Gilmore in 1914, or used as a weapon. Robert Bakker noted that it is likely that the stegosaur tail was much more flexible than those of other ornithischian dinosaurs because it lacked ossified tendons, thus lending credence to the idea of the tail as a weapon. He also observed that Stegosaurus could have maneuvered its rear easily by keeping its large hindlimbs stationary and pushing off with its very powerfully muscled but short forelimbs, allowing it to swivel deftly to deal with an attack. In 2010, analysis of a digitized model of Kentrosaurus aethiopicus showed that the tail could bring the thagomizer around to the sides of the dinosaur, possibly striking an attacker beside it.

In 2001, a study of tail spikes by McWhinney et al., showed a high incidence of trauma-related damage. This also supports the theory that the spikes were used in combat. There is also evidence for Stegosaurus defending itself from Allosaurus predation, in the form of two specimens of the latter (a tail vertebra and a pubis) with partially healed puncture wounds that fit Stegosaurus tail spikes. Stegosaurus stenops had four dermal spikes, each about 60–90 cm (2–3 ft) long. Discoveries of articulated stegosaur armor show that, at least in some species, these spikes protruded horizontally from the tail, not vertically as is often depicted. Initially, Marsh described S. armatus as having eight spikes in its tail, unlike S. stenops. However, recent research re-examined this and concluded this species also had four.

=== Posture ===
A digital articulation and manipulation of digital scans of specimen material of Kentrosaurus inferred that stegosaurids may have used an erect limb posture, like that of most mammals, for habitual locomotion while using a sprawled crocodilian pose for defensive behavior. The sprawled pose would allow them to tolerate the large lateral forces used in swinging the spiked tail against predators as a clubbing device.

=== Sexual dimorphism ===
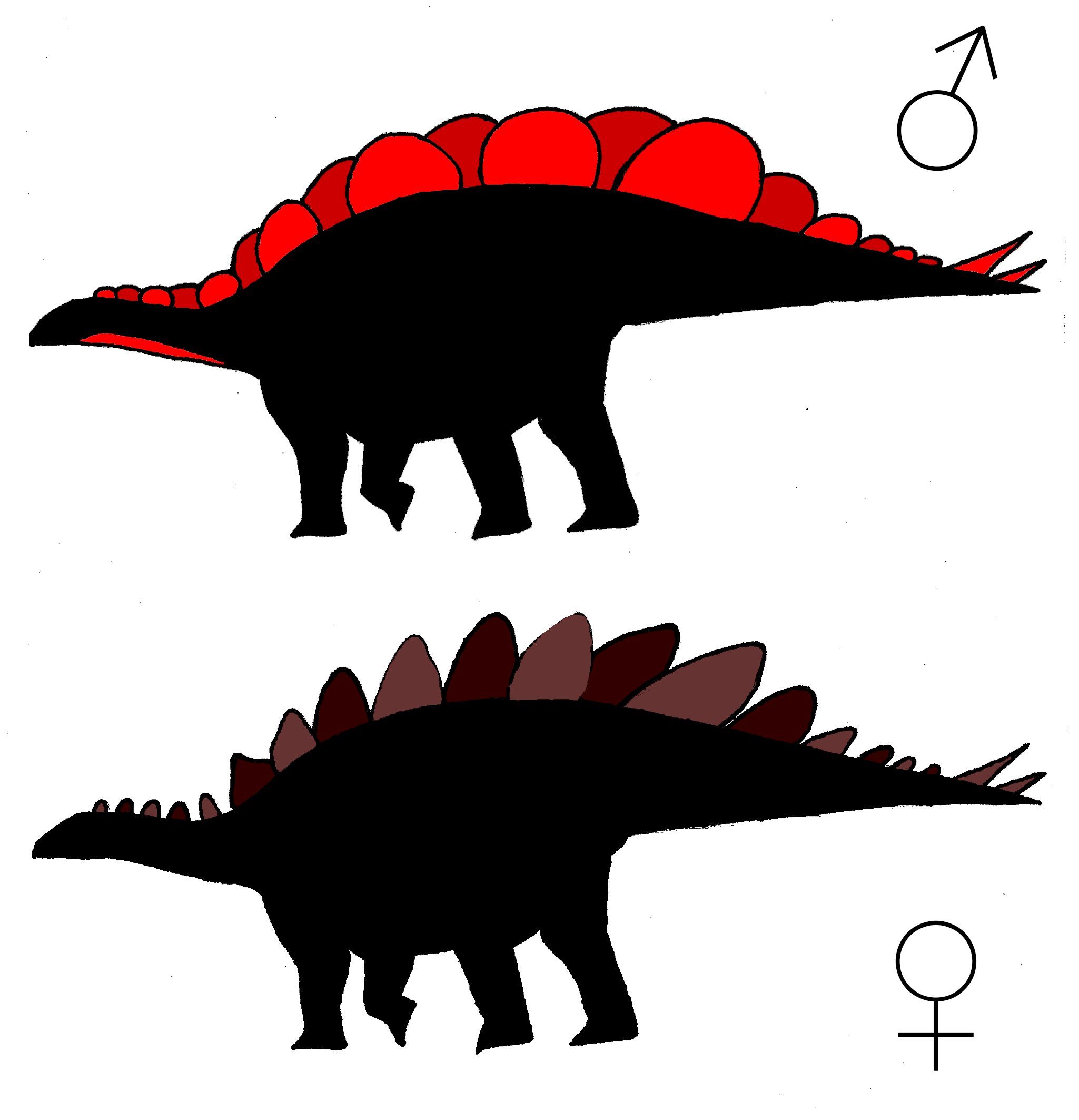
Hypothetical sexual dimorphism of Hesperosaurus mjosi, including variation in plate shape and coloration

There have been several findings of possible sexual dimorphism in stegosaurids. Saitta (2015) presents evidence of two morphs of Hesperosaurus dorsal plates, with one morph having a wide, oval plate with a surface area 45% larger than the narrow, tall morph. Considering that dorsal plates most likely functioned as display structures and that the wide oval shape allowed a broad continuous display, Saitta assigns the wider morph with a larger surface area as male.

Kevin Padian, a paleontologist at the University of California, Berkeley, remarked that Saitta had misidentified features in his specimen's bone tissue sections and said "there's no evidence the animal has stopped growing". Padian also expressed ethical concerns about the use of private specimens in the study.

Kentrosaurus, Dacentrurus, and Stegosaurus are also suggested to have exhibited dimorphism in the form of three extra sacral ribs in the females.

=== Feeding ===
In order to explore the feeding habits of stegosaurids, Reichel (2010) created a 3-D model of Stegosaurus teeth using the software ZBrush. The model finds that the bite forces of Stegosaurus were significantly weaker than those of Labradors, wolves, and humans. The finding suggests that these dinosaurs would be capable of breaking smaller branches and leaves with their teeth, but would not be able to bite through a thick object (12 mm or more in diameter). Parrish et al.'s (2004) description of Jurassic flora in the stegosaurid-rich Morrison Formation supports this finding. The flora during this time period was dominated by seasonal small, fast-growing herbaceous plants, which stegosaurids could consume easily if Reichel's reconstruction is accurate.

Mallison (2010) suggested that Kentrosaurus may have used a tripodal stance on their hindlimbs and tail to double the foraging height from the general low browsing height under one metre for stegosaurids. This challenged the view that stegosaurs are primarily low vegetation feeders because of their small heads, short necks, and short forelimbs, since the tripodal stance would also give them access to young trees and high bushes.

Another piece of evidence suggesting that some stegosaurids may have consumed more than just low vegetation was the discovery of the long-necked stegosaurid Miragaia longicollum. This dinosaur's neck has at least 17 cervical vertebrae achieved through the transformation of thoracic vertebrae into cervical vertebrae and possible lengthening of the centrum. This is more than most sauropod dinosaurs, which also achieved the elongation of the neck through similar mechanisms and had access to fodder higher off the ground.

Evidence from Yakutia suggests that Early Cretaceous stegosaurs living in high latitude environments were capable of palinal jaw motion and exhibited high rates of tooth replacement and short tooth formation time.
