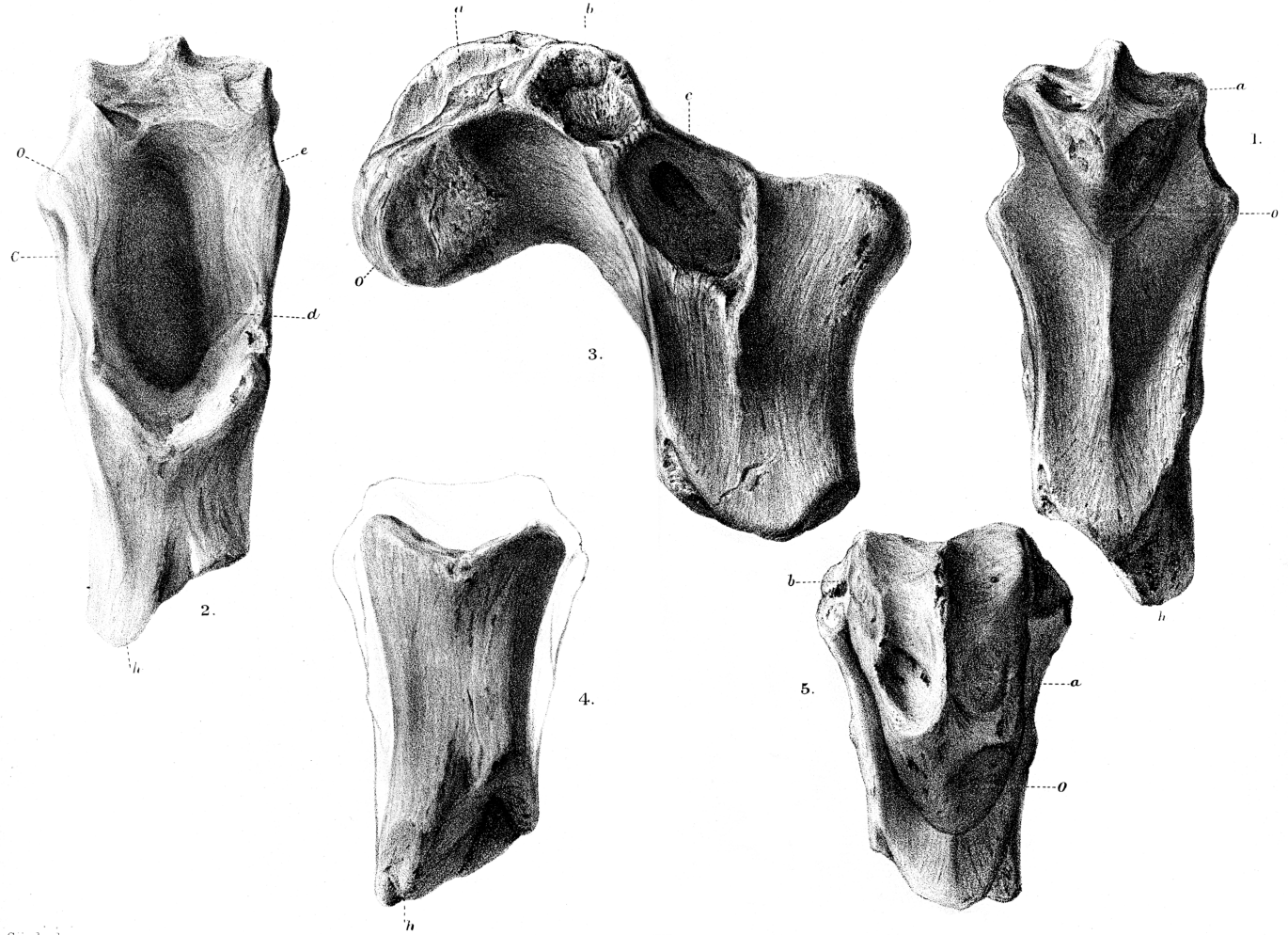
- Holotype neural arch of C. pottonensis as seen from multiple angles

Scientific classification
- Kingdom: Animalia
- Phylum: Chordata
- Class: Reptilia
- Clade: Dinosauria
- Clade: †Ornithischia
- Clade: †Thyreophora
- Clade: †Stegosauria
- Genus: †Craterosaurus; Seeley, 1874
- Species: †C. pottonensis

Binomial name
- †Craterosaurus pottonensis Seeley, 1874

= Craterosaurus =

Craterosaurus Temporal range: Early Cretaceous, Aptian

Extinct genus of dinosaurs

Craterosaurus (meaning krater reptile or bowl reptile) is a dubious genus of stegosaurian dinosaur that lived during the Early Cretaceous (possibly Aptian stage) of the Woburn Sands Formation of England. Estimated to measure around 4 m (13 ft) in length and weighing approximately 560 kg (1,230 lb), Craterosaurus may actually be a junior synonym of Regnosaurus, but only one fossil, a partial vertebra, was recovered.

== History of naming ==
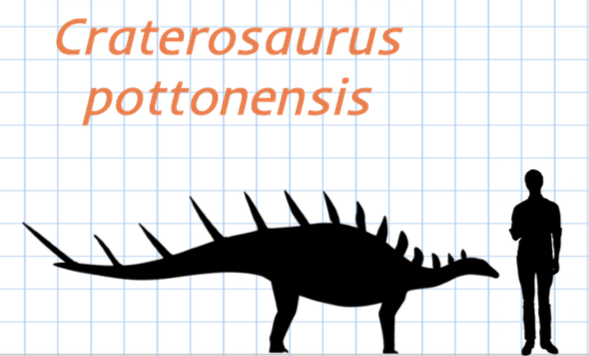
Size comparison, based on Kentrosaurus

A fossil was discovered by Mr. Charlesworth in the Woburn Sands Formation near Potton, Bedfordshire, in a brown sandstone layer with many phosphate nodules. In 1874 this fossil was described by British palaeontologist Harry Govier Seeley as a new taxon, named Craterosaurus pottonensis. The holotype and only definitive specimen of Craterosaurus is stored in the Sedgwick Museum of Earth Sciences under accession number SMC B.28814. Seeley interpreted Craterosaurus as being represented by a partial braincase, which he found showed support for it as a member of Dinosauria with uncertain relationships. It was possible that Craterosaurus could be aligned with Ceteosauria or Iguanodon, but with limited material to compare Seeley did not classify Craterosaurus further.

In 1912 Hungarian palaeontologist Franz Nopcsa re-evaluated Craterosaurus with the hope that it could be classified more confidently, identifying that the material, which Seeley believed was a braincase, was instead part of the neural arch of a dorsal vertebra. From this, Nopcsa was able to positively compare Craterosaurus to Stegosaurus, as a member of Stegosauria. Craterosaurus was so similar to Stegosaurus that Nopcsa considered their synonymy possible, but retained them as separate due to the younger age and location of Craterosaurus. British palaeontologist Peter Galton revisited Craterosaurus again in 1981, supporting its distinction as a stegosaurid, and narrowing down its provenance to the upper Aptian of the Woburn Sands at the youngest, though it is possibly reworked from older Neocomian or lower Aptian sediments. Galton also tentatively referred a second specimen, NHMUK R.4134, to Craterosaurus, having been found in the Wealden Formation of Sussex.

Reviews of Stegosauria by British palaeontologist Susannah Maidment and colleagues since 2008 have instead found that Craterosaurus is too incomplete to be diagnostic, and although it shows anatomy characteristic of Stegosauria, it lacks diagnostic features, so it is considered a nomen dubium.
