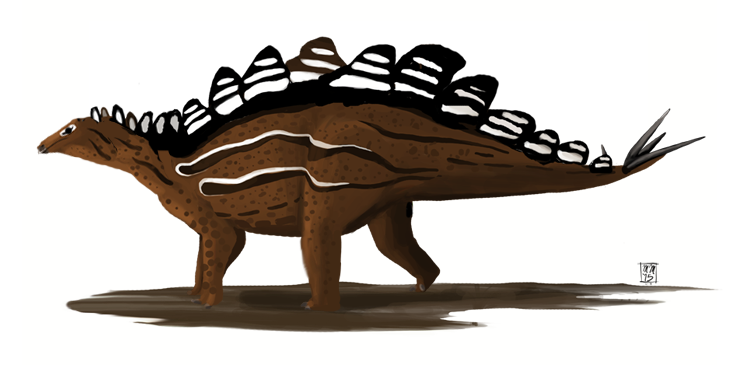
- Life restoration of Stegosaurus, the possible trackmaker of Stegopodus

Trace fossil classification
- Kingdom: Animalia
- Phylum: Chordata
- Class: Reptilia
- Clade: Dinosauria
- Clade: †Ornithischia
- Clade: †Thyreophora
- Clade: †Stegosauria
- Family: †Stegosauridae
- Ichnogenus: †Stegopodus; Lockley, Hunt & Foster, 1998

Type ichnospecies
- †Stegopodus czerkasi Lockley, Hunt & Foster, 1998

= Stegopodus =

Stegopodus Temporal range: Late Jurassic, Kimmeridgian–Tithonian

Stegosaur tracks

Stegopodus is an ichnogenus erected in 1998 for the second set of stegosaur tracks from the Morrison Formation. The tracks were found near Arches National Park, also in Utah. Unlike the first, this trackway preserved traces of the forefeet. Fossil remains indicate that stegosaurs have four digits on the forefeet and three weight-bearing digits on the hind feet. From this, paleontologists were able to successfully predict the appearance of stegosaur tracks in 1990, six years in advance of the first actual discovery of Morrison stegosaur tracks. Since the erection of Stegopodus, more trackways have been found, however none have preserved traces of the front feet, and stegosaur traces remain rare.

== See also ==
- Paleobiota of the Morrison Formation
- Timeline of stegosaur research
