= Yura =

Yura may refer to:

== Place ==
- Hon-Yura Station, a passenger railway station
- Tango-Yura Station, a passenger railway station
- Yura-Gora, a rural locality in Russia
- Yura, Wakayama, a town in Japan
- Yura Corporation d.o.o., Serbian cable and harnessing manufacturing company
- Yura District, a district in Peru
- Yura Fortress, was the name of a group of coastal fortifications
- Yura River (disambiguation)
- Yura Station, a railway station in Japan
- Yura Hotel Čeladná, Hotel in Czech Republic

== Ethnic groups and languages ==
- Yura, or Adnyamathanha, an Aboriginal group of South Australia
- Yura, or Eora, an Aboriginal group of New South Wales, Australia
- Yura, or Yuracaré people, a Bolivian indigenous group
- Yura, or Yuracaré language, a language of Bolivia
- Yura languages, a language group of Australia

== People with the name ==
- Yura (footballer), Júlio Titow (born 1952), Brazilian footballer
- Yura (South Korean singer) (born 1992), South Korean singer and member of Girl's Day
- Yura Borisov (born 1992), Russian actor
- Yura Halim (1923–2016), Bruneian politician
- Yura Kim, a nickname of Kim Jong-il, the leader of North Korea
- Yura Matsuda (born 1998), Japanese figure skater
- Yura Min (born 1995), South Korean ice dancer
- Yura Murase (born 2007) Japanese snowboarder
- Yura Movsisyan (born 1987), Armenian soccer player
- Yura Indera Putera (born 1996) Bruneian professional footballer
- Yura Yunita (born 1991), Indonesian jazz singer
- Akari Yura (born 1999) Japanese singer, voice actress, and model
- Hiroaki Yura (born 1981), Japanese violinist
- Hnat Yura (1888–1966), Soviet and Ukrainian director, actor of theatre and film, pedagogue
- Jeong Yura (disambiguation), several people

== Other uses ==
- Japanese cruiser Yura, a 1922 cruiser of the Imperial Japanese Navy
- Yura (Mandaeism), an uthra or angel in Mandaeism
- Yura Sakuratsuki, a character in the anime series Futakoi

== See also ==
- Iura (disambiguation)
- Jura (disambiguation)
