= Lura =

Lura may refer to: y tế

== People ==
- Lura (singer) (born 1975), a Portuguese singer and musician, of Cape Verdean descent
- Lura Harris Craighead (1858-1926), American civic and patriotic worker, author, parliamentarian, clubwoman
- Lura Lynn Ryan (1934–2011), the First Lady of the U.S. state of Illinois from 1999 to 2003
- Lura Eugenie Brown Smith (1864–?), American journalist, newspaper editor, author
- Lura S. Tally (1921–2012), American politician and educator from North Carolina
- Michael Lura (1948–2004), American politician from Iowa

== Places ==
=== Albania ===
- Lura, or Lurë, a former municipality in the Dibër County, northeastern Albania
- Lura National Park, a national park located in the municipality of Dibër in northeastern Albania

=== China ===
- Lura, Tibet, a village in the Tibet Autonomous Region of China

=== Italy ===
- Lura (stream), a stream in Italy, a tributary of the Olona

=== Norway ===
- Lura, Norway, a borough of the city of Sandnes in Rogaland county, Norway

=== United States ===
- Lura Lake, a lake in Blue Earth and Faribault counties in Minnesota, USA
- Lura Township, Faribault County, Minnesota, a township in Minnesota, USA

== See also ==
- Lura Formation, a geological formation in western China
- Lura Building, a building in Mayville, North Dakota, USA that was built in 1900
- LuraTech, a software company which makes products for handling and conversion of digital documents
- Loura (disambiguation)
- Iura (disambiguation)
