= Iura =

Iura may refer to:

- Ius, plural iura, right or law in Latin
- Arata Iura (born 1974), Japanese actor

== See also ==
- Lura (disambiguation)
- Jura (disambiguation)
- Yura (disambiguation)
