= Timeline of stegosaur research =

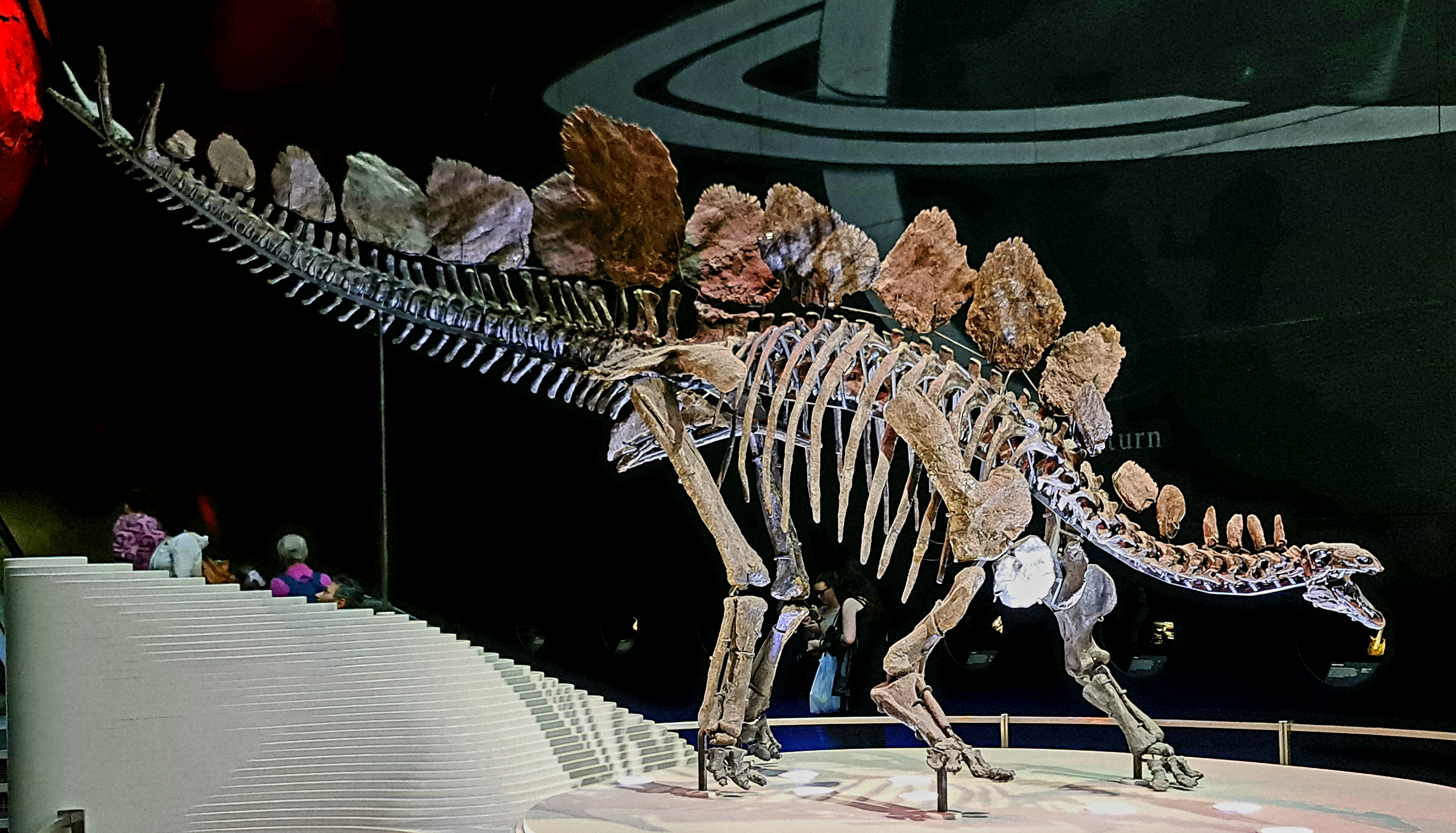
Skeletal mount of Stegosaurus.

This timeline of stegosaur research is a chronological listing of events in the history of paleontology focused on the stegosaurs, the iconic plate-backed, spike-tailed herbivorous eurypod dinosaurs that predominated during the Jurassic period. The first scientifically documented stegosaur remains were recovered from Early Cretaceous strata in England during the mid-19th century. However, they would not be recognized as a distinct group of dinosaurs until Othniel Charles Marsh described the new genus and species Stegosaurus armatus in 1877, which he regarded as the founding member of the Stegosauria. This new taxon originally included all armored dinosaurs. It was not until 1927 that Alfred Sherwood Romer implemented the modern use of the name Stegosauria as specifically pertaining to the plate-backed and spike-tailed dinosaurs.

From the time of their earliest description, the chief mystery surrounding stegosaurs was the function of their distinctive back plates. Marsh originally interpreted them as being plates of armor that would protect against predators. In 1910, Richard Swann Lull would agree with this hypothesis. Charles Whitney Gilmore disagreed in 1914 and argued that the only protection a stegosaur could gain from its plates was to appear intimidatingly larger to potential predators. Nearly forty years later, Davitashvili argued that the plates were too fragile to be used for defense and instead used to attract mates and signal the stegosaur's rank in a social hierarchy.

In the late 1970s, James O. Farlow and others would propose that the thin, blood vessel-rich plates helped absorb or lose body heat, depending on the animal's own physiological requirements. This hypothesis was put forth in a broader context of scientists considering the possibility that dinosaurs may have maintained body temperatures and activity levels similar to those of modern birds and mammals, in which case the plates may have served primarily to shed heat rather than gain it. In the late 1980s Buffrenil and others revived the idea that stegosaur plates were display structures, an interpretation that would continue to find favor from researchers like Main and colleagues into the 21st century.

== 19th century ==
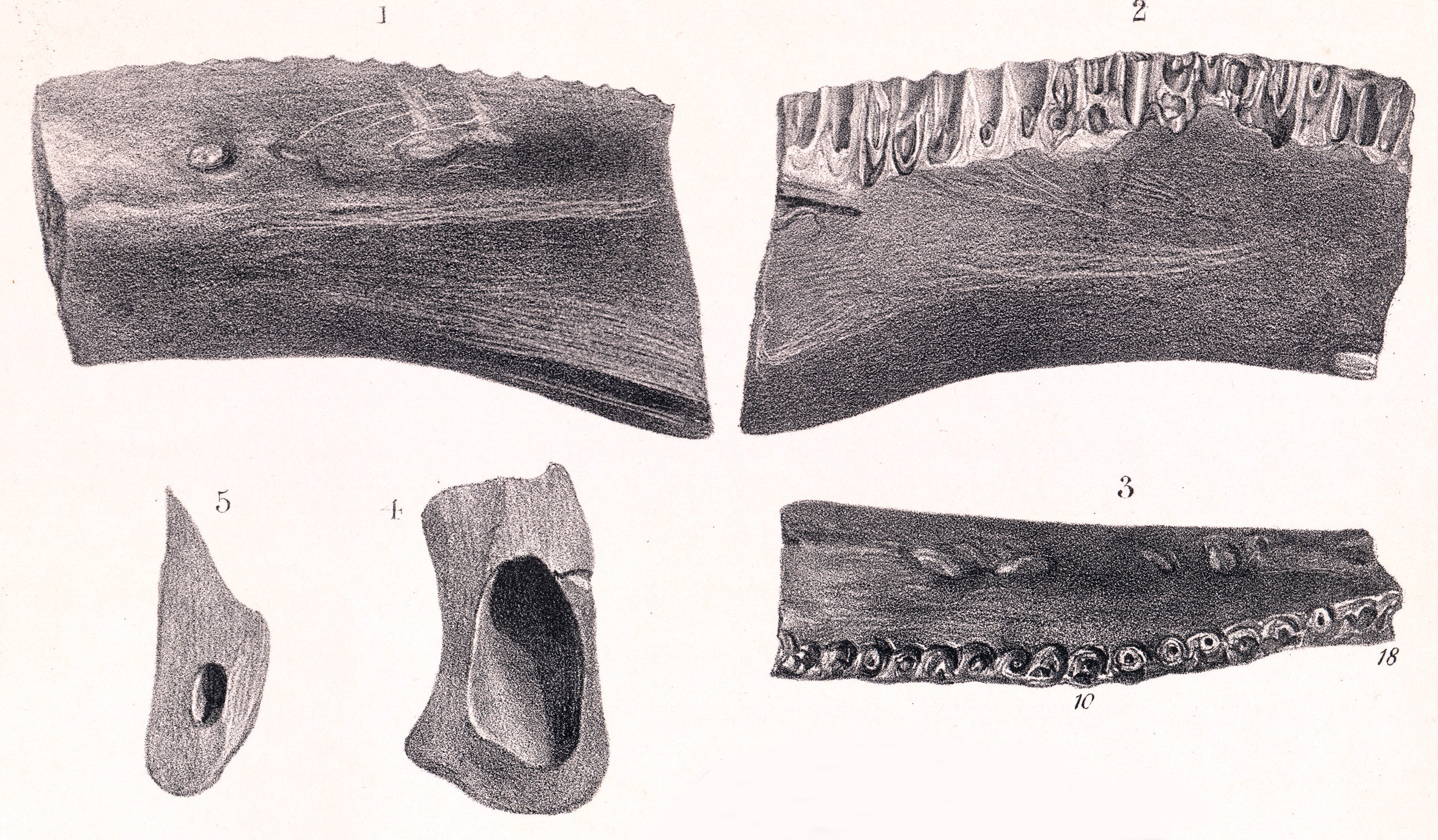
Regnosaurus jaw fragments.

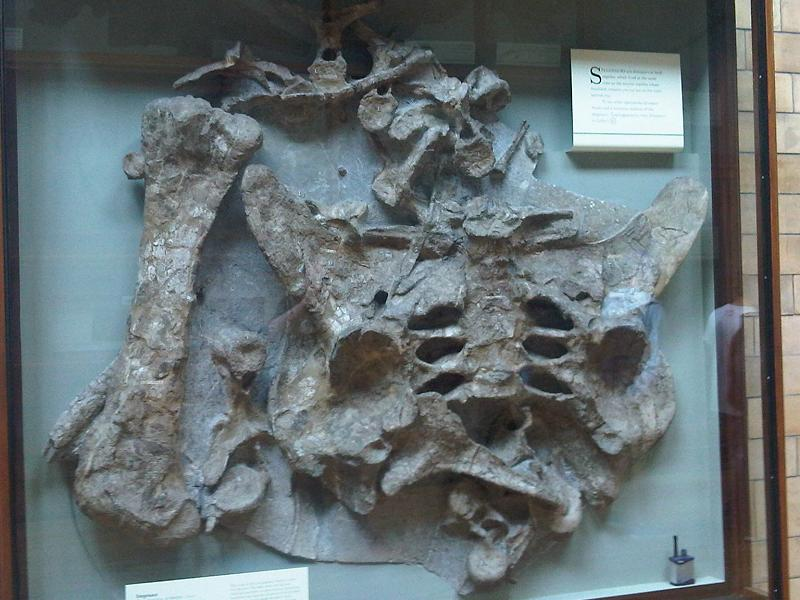
Type specimen of Omosaurus armatus.

=== 1840s ===
==== 1841 ====
- Gideon Mantell described the new genus and species Regnosaurus northamptoni.

=== 1870s ===
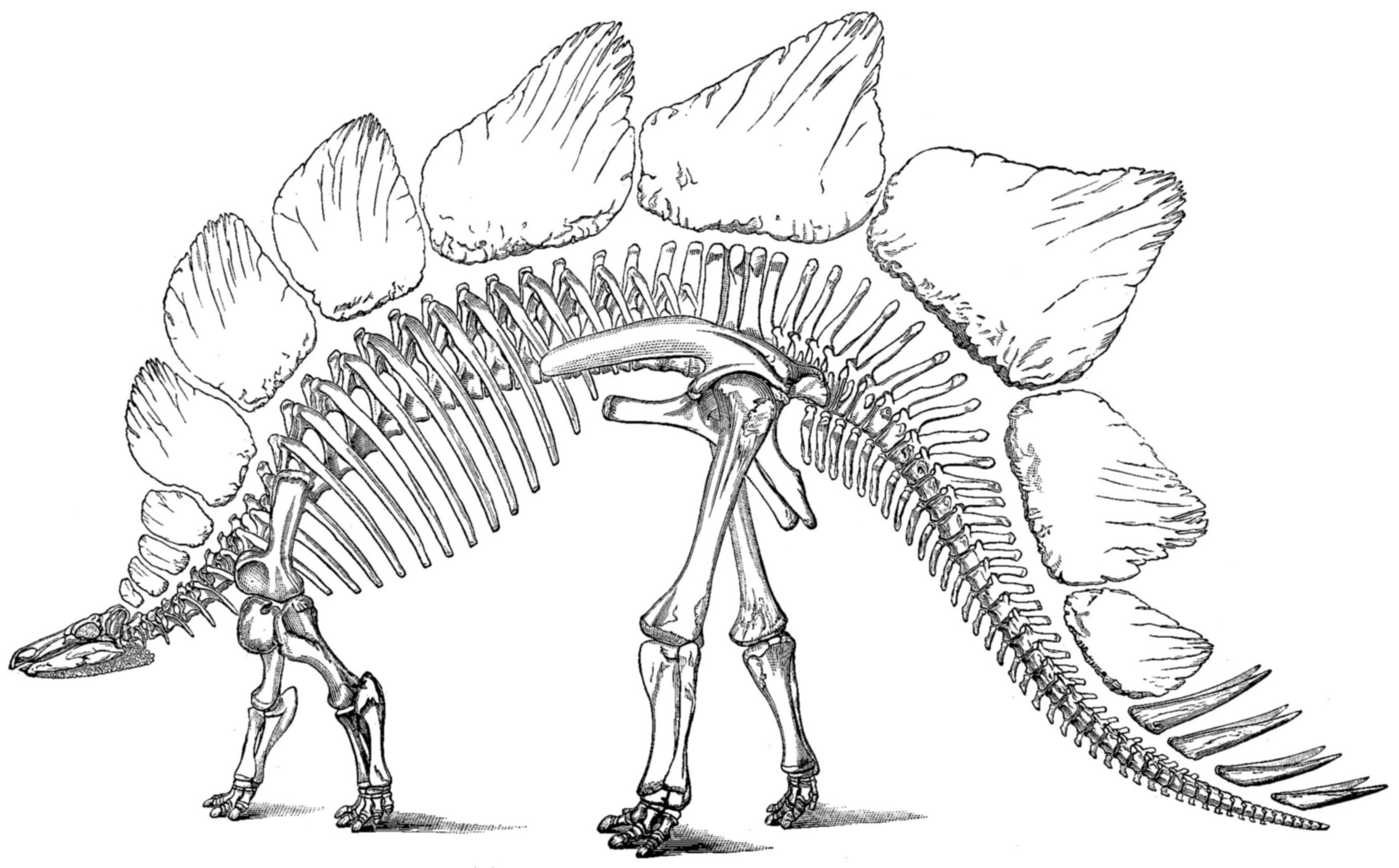
Othniel Charles Marsh's reconstruction of Stegosaurus.

==== 1874 ====
- Harry Govier Seeley described the new genus and species Craterosaurus pottonensis.

==== 1875 ====
- Sir Richard Owen described the new genus and species Omosaurus armatus.

==== 1876 ====
- Owen described the new species Anthodon serrarius.

==== 1877 ====
- Othniel Charles Marsh described the new genus and species Stegosaurus armatus.
- Marsh named the Stegosauria.
- Owen described the new species Omosaurus hastiger.

==== 1878 ====
- Edward Drinker Cope described the new genus and species Hypsirhophus discurus.

==== 1879 ====
- Cope described the new species Hypsirhophus seeleyanus.

=== 1880s ===
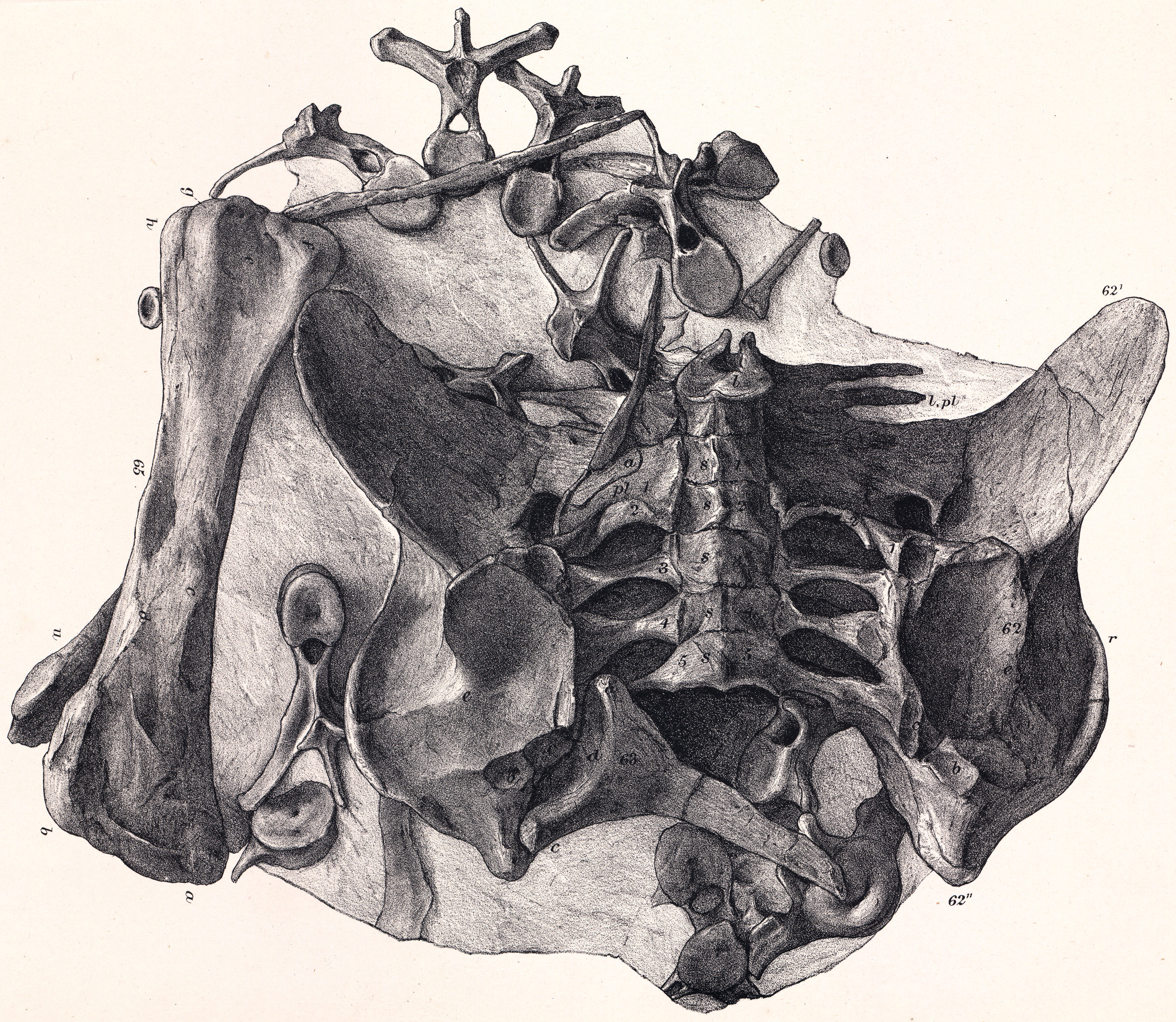
Holotype of Omosaurus (now Dacentrurus) armatus, from Sir Richard Owen's 1875 monograph.

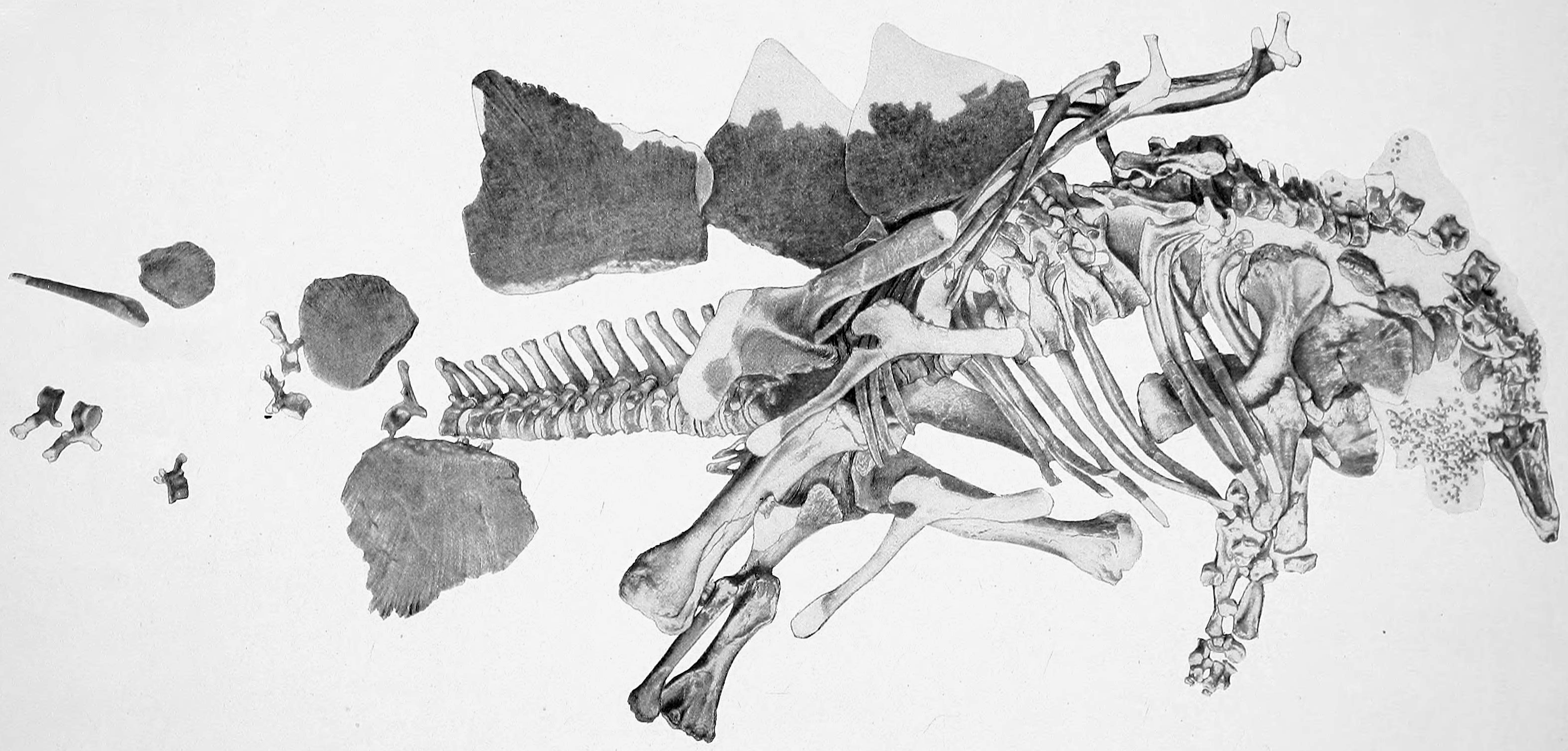
Holotype of Stegosaurus stenops.

==== 1880 ====
- Marsh named the Stegosauridae.
- Marsh interpreted the plates of Stegosaurus as an armored covering and its spines as natural weapons.
- Marsh described the new species Stegosaurus affinis.

==== 1881 ====
- Marsh described the new genus and species Diracodon laticeps.

==== 1884 ====
- Hulke reported a Cretaceous stegosaur pubis from England.

==== 1887 ====
- Hulke described the new species Omosaurus durobrivensis.
- Marsh described the new species Stegosaurus sulcatus.
- Marsh described the new species Stegosaurus duplex. Marsh described the new species Stegosaurus stenops.

=== 1890s ===
==== 1891 ====
- Marsh provided an illustrated description of Stegosaurus ungulatus, with a row of erect plates running along the centre of its back.

==== 1893 ====
- Harry Govier Seeley described the new species Omosaurus phillipsi.

== 20th century ==
=== 1900s ===
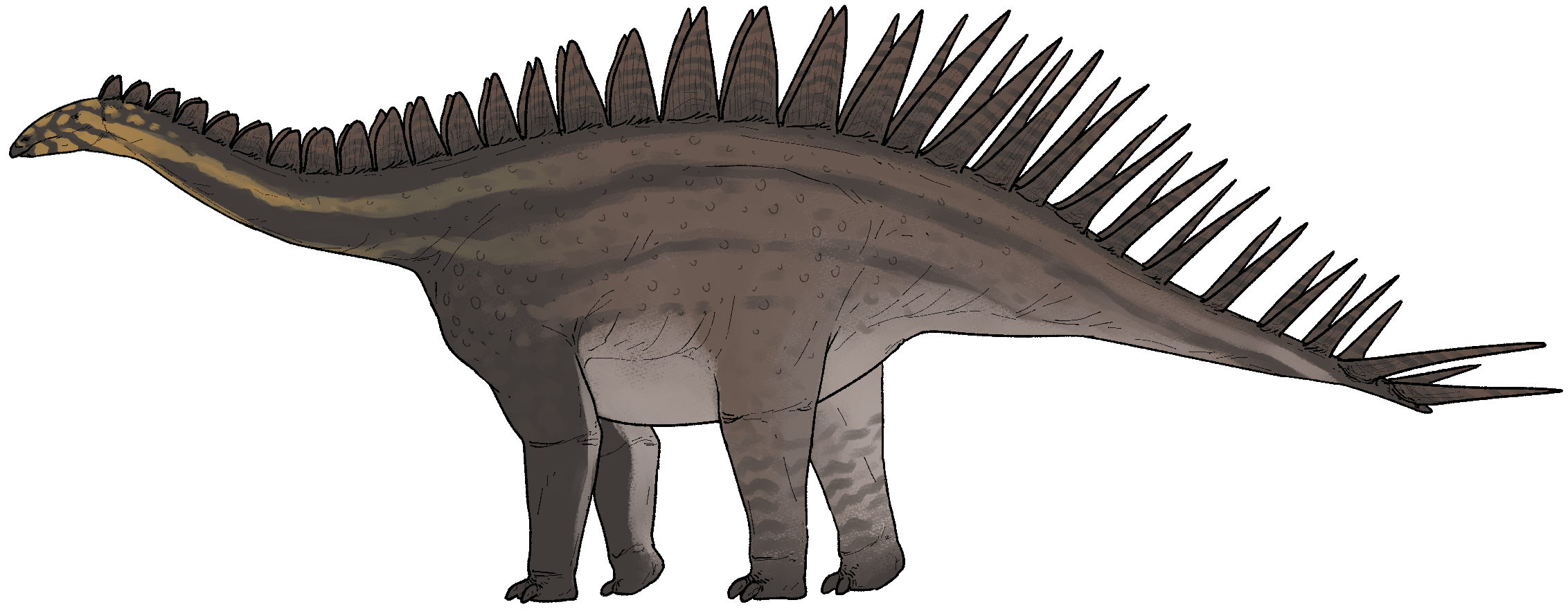
Artist's restoration of Dacentrurus.

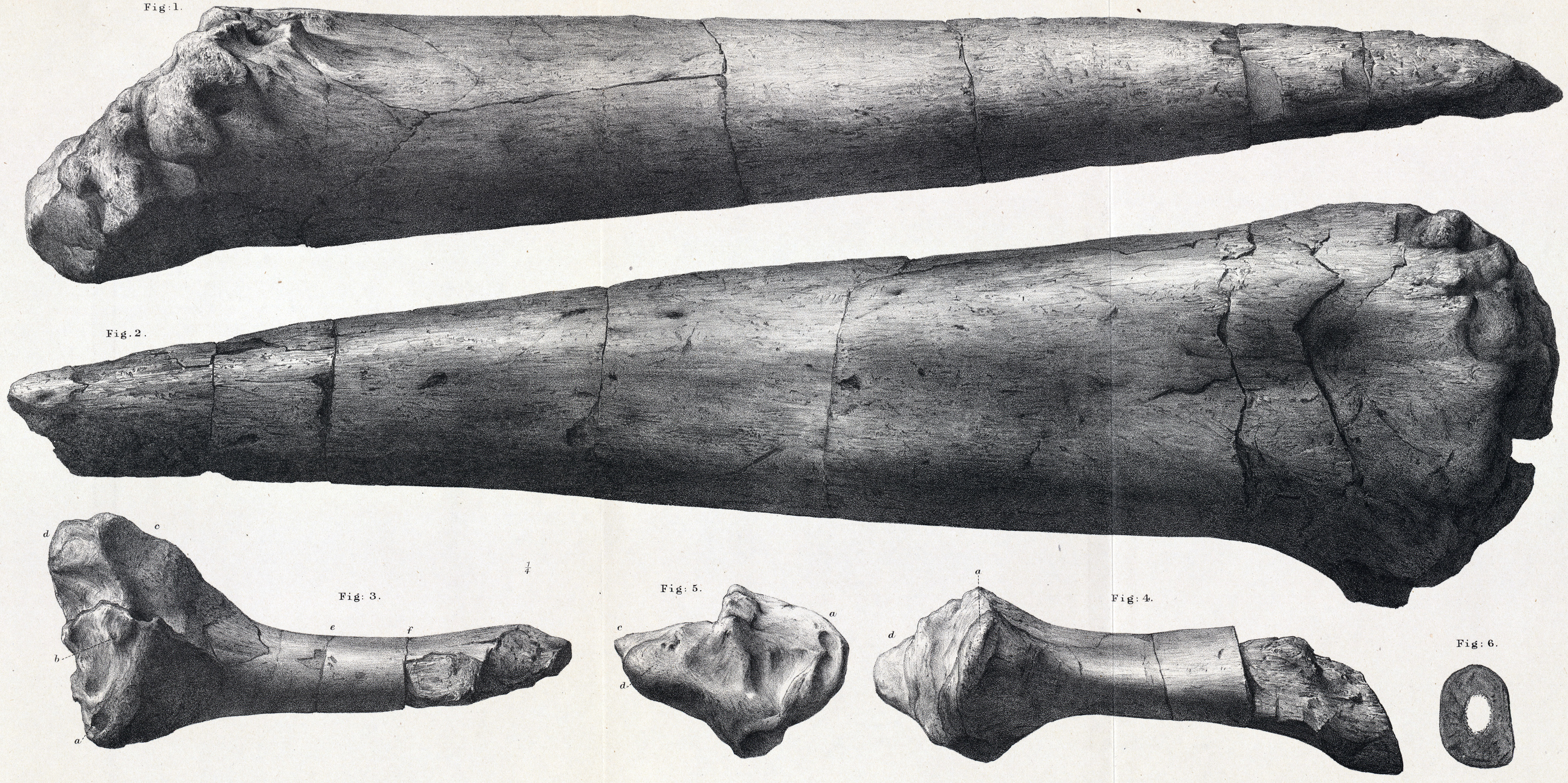
Dacentrurus spike and limb bones.

==== 1901 ====
- Seeley described the new species Omosaurus leedsi.

==== 1902 ====
- Frederick Augustus Lucas described the new genus Dacentrurus to house the species Omosaurus armatus.

==== 1905 ====
- Loomis argued that the plates adorning the backs of stegosaurs were maladaptive traits that sapped their vigor and signaled their impending extinction. Similar arguments would later be extended to the extinction of the dinosaurs overall by Woodward in 1910.

=== 1910s ===
==== 1910 ====
- Von Huene described the species Omosaurus vetustus.
- Richard Swann Lull followed Marsh's interpretation of Stegosaurus plates as armor and its tail spines as "defensive" weapons.

==== 1911 ====
- Franz Nopcsa described the new species Omosaurus lennieri. He also described the new species Stegosaurus priscus.

==== 1912 ====
- Robert Broom described the new species Palaeoscincus africanus.

==== 1914 ====
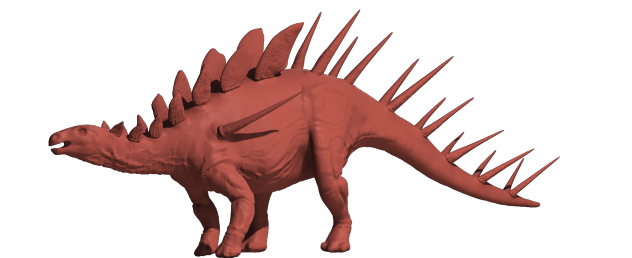
Artist's restoration of Kentrosaurus.

- Charles Whitney Gilmore described Stegosaurus longispinus. He agreed with previous workers that Stegosaurus used its spines to protect itself, but dismissed the idea that its plates functioned as armor. However, Gilmore conceded that the plates may have helped protect it by making it appear intimidatingly large to predators.

==== 1915 ====
- Edwin Hennig described the new genus and species Kentrosaurus aethiopicus.

==== 1916 ====
- Nopcsa renamed Kentrosaurus into Doryphorosaurus.
- Hennig renamed Kentrosaurus into Kentrurosaurus. Both new names were unnecessary.

=== 1920s ===
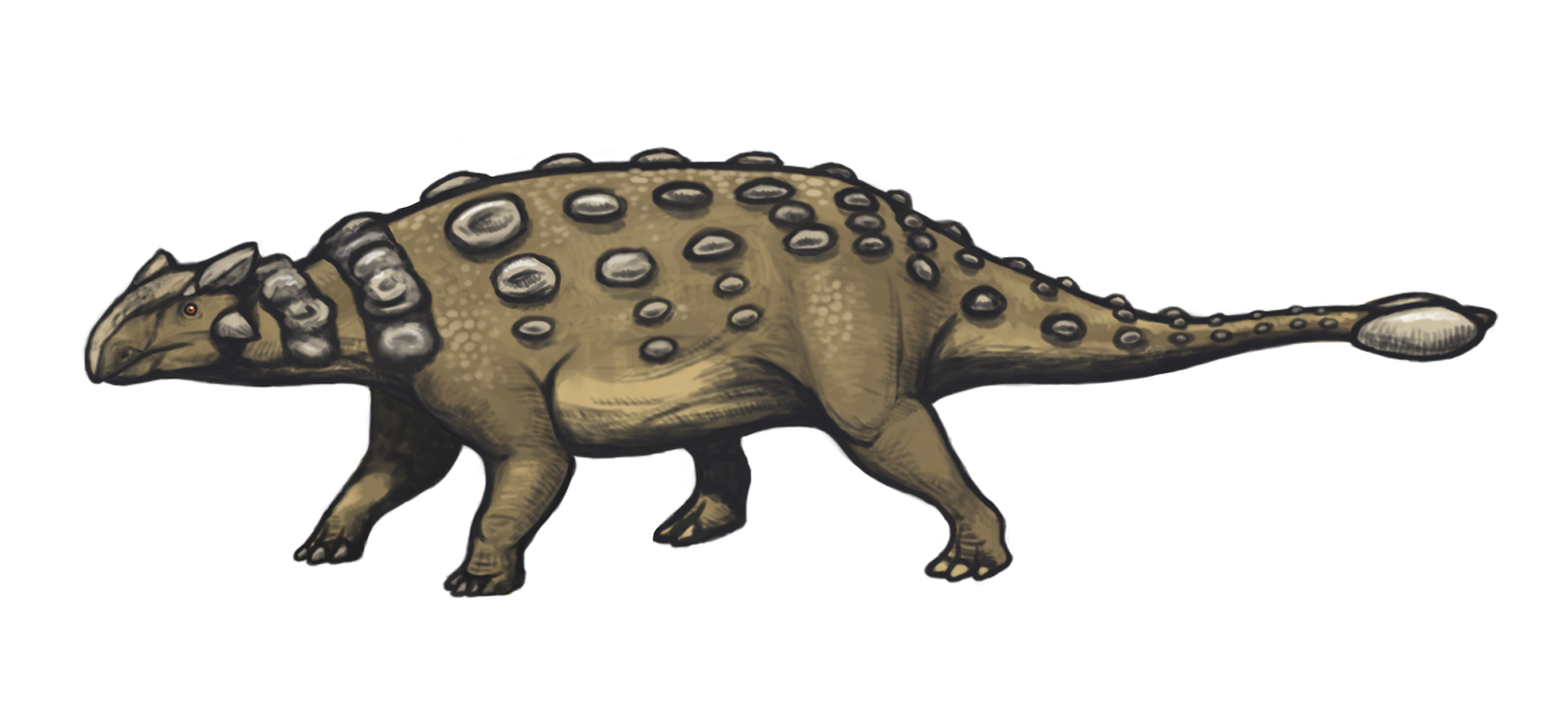
Ankylosaurs (pictured) were first distinguished from stegosaurs in 1927 by Romer.

==== 1924 ====
- Hennig described the distribution of Kentrosaurus bones in Quarry St at Tendaguru, Tanzania. He observed that at one place in the quarry multiple sacra were found near each other, while another area of the quarry contained limb bones, and yet another preserved vertebrae.

==== 1927 ====
- Alfred Sherwood Romer observed that the anatomy of the stegosaur pelvis and hindlimb as well as their primarily Jurassic age distinguished them from the mainly Cretaceous ankylosaurs. As the Stegosauria originally included all armored dinosaurs, Romer's distinction marked the beginning of the modern use of the name to refer to the plate-backed and spike-tailed dinosaurs.

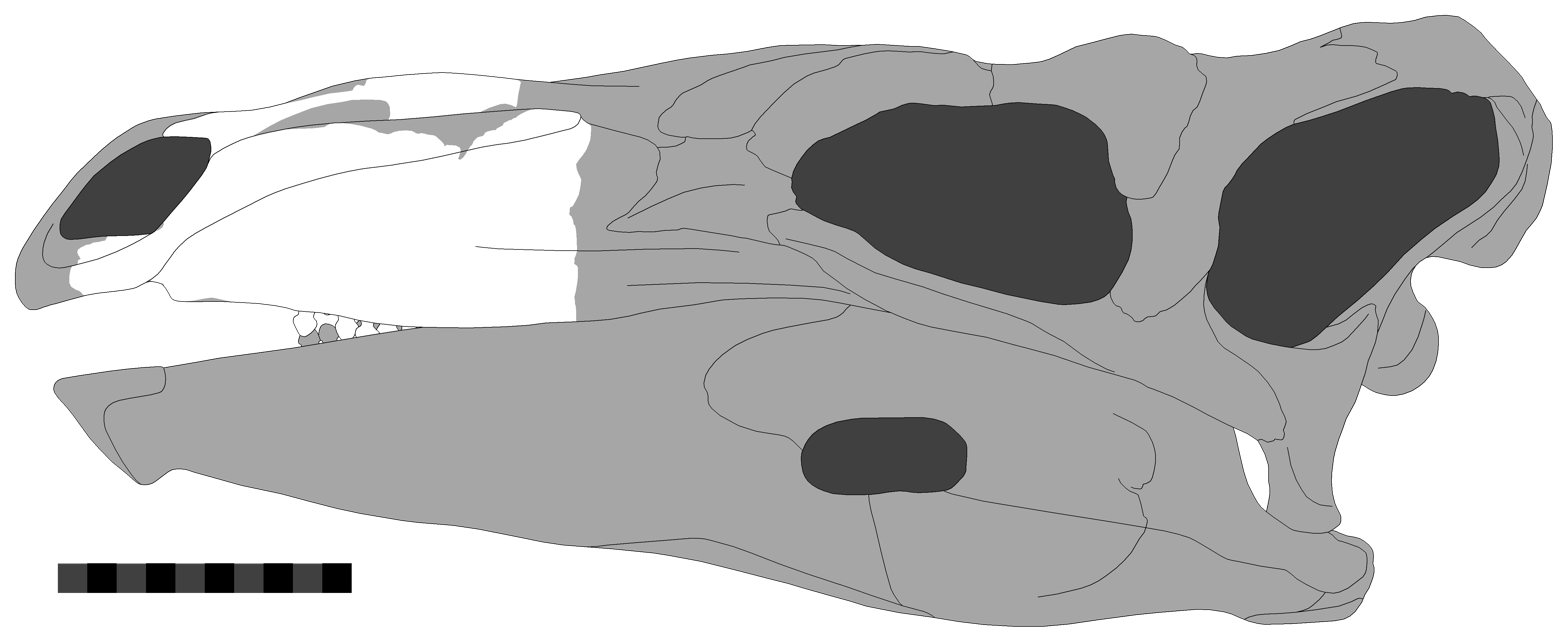
Skull of Paranthodon.

==== 1929 ====
- Nopcsa erected the new taxon Paranthodon oweni for the same material as Palaeoscincus africanus.

=== 1940s ===
==== 1944 ====
- Yang Zhongjian ("C. C. Young") reported indeterminate stegosaur remains from the Kuangyuan Series. They are among the oldest known stegosaur bones.

=== 1950s ===
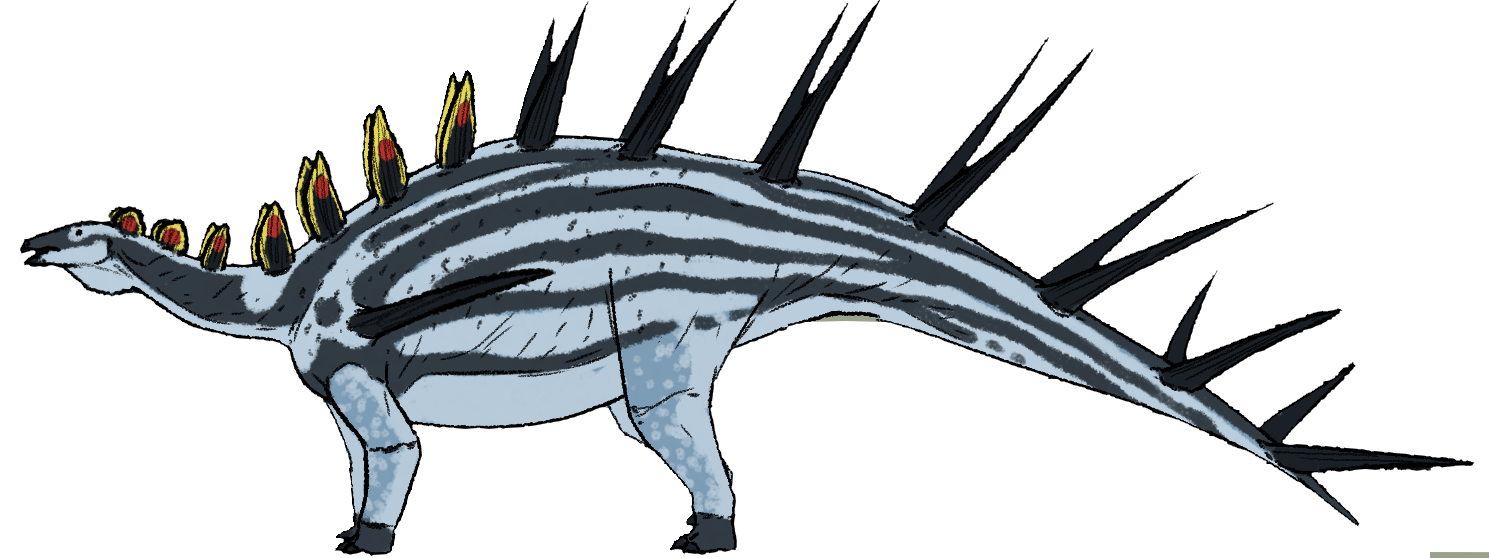
Artist's restoration of Chialingosaurus kuani.

==== 1951 ====
- Young (Yang) described the new genus and species Chialingosaurus kuani.

==== 1957 ====
- De Lapparent and Georges Zbyszewski described the new species Astrodon pusillus.
- De Lapparent and Zbyszewski reported a possible stegosaur egg associated with a Dacentrurus skeleton from Portugal. However, as the mysterious object lacks a shell, it is now considered to be a nodule of geologic rather than biological origin.
- Hoffstetter described the new genus Lexovisaurus to house the species Omosaurus durobrivensis.

=== 1960s ===
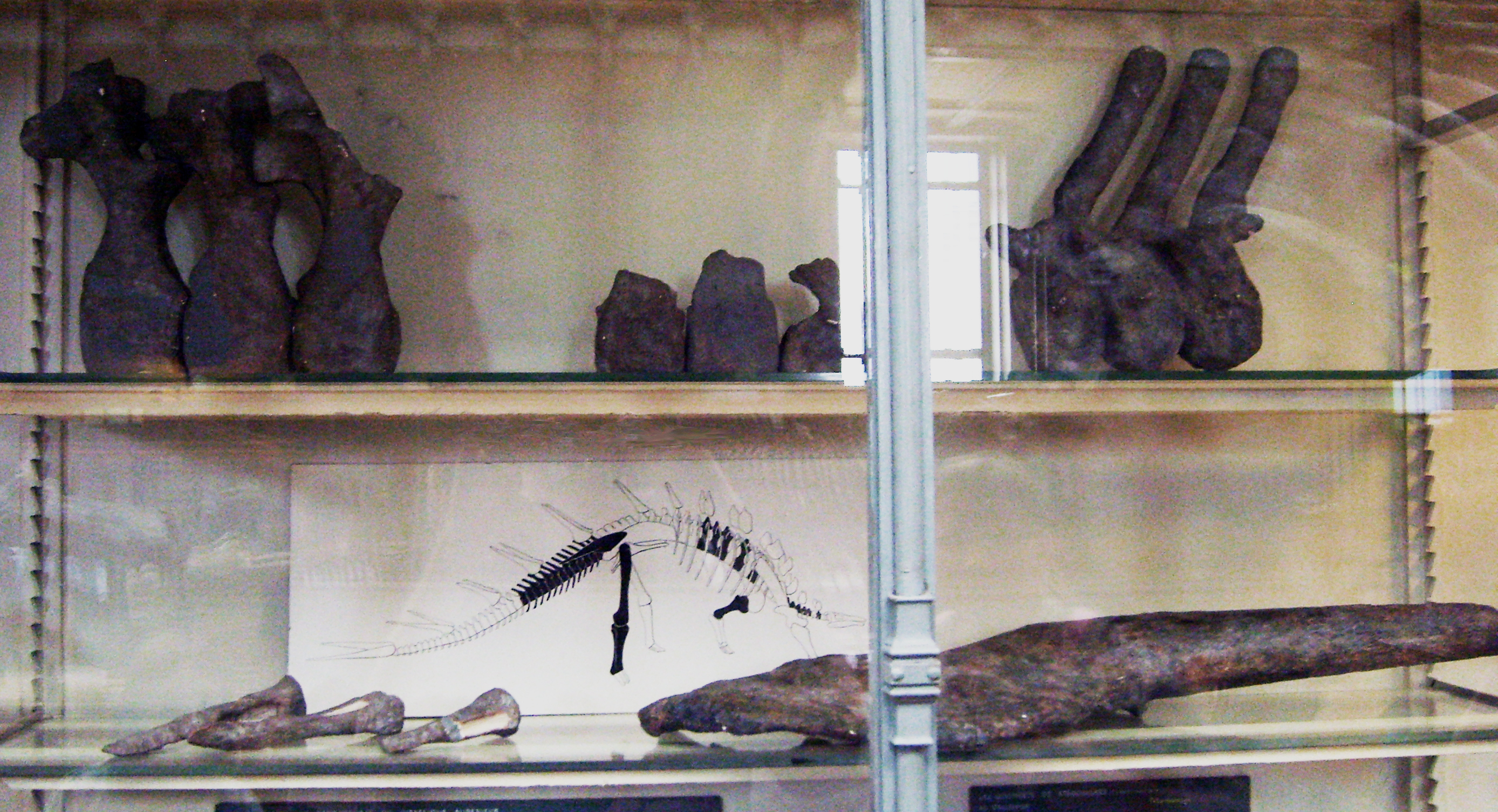
Fossils of Lexovisaurus.

==== 1961 ====
- Davitashvili marshalled further evidence against the hypothesis that stegosaur plates functioned as armor. He observed that the plates would be ineffective as armor because they were thin, only shallowly embedded in the skin, and left most of the animal's sides exposed. He felt they were used as display structures to attract mates and signal an individual's position within a social hierarchy.

==== 1963 ====
- Nicholas Hotton III proposed that stegosaur plates could be moved by flexing muscles in the skin, allowing the plates to function defensively, discouraging attacks from either above or the side depending on the plates' position at any given time.

==== 1966 ====
- Dorothy Hill and others reported a possible Early Jurassic stegosaur footprint from Australia.
- John Ostrom and John Stanton McIntosh reported that Stegosaurus remains were unusually common in Quarry 13 at Como Bluff, Wyoming.

=== 1970s ===
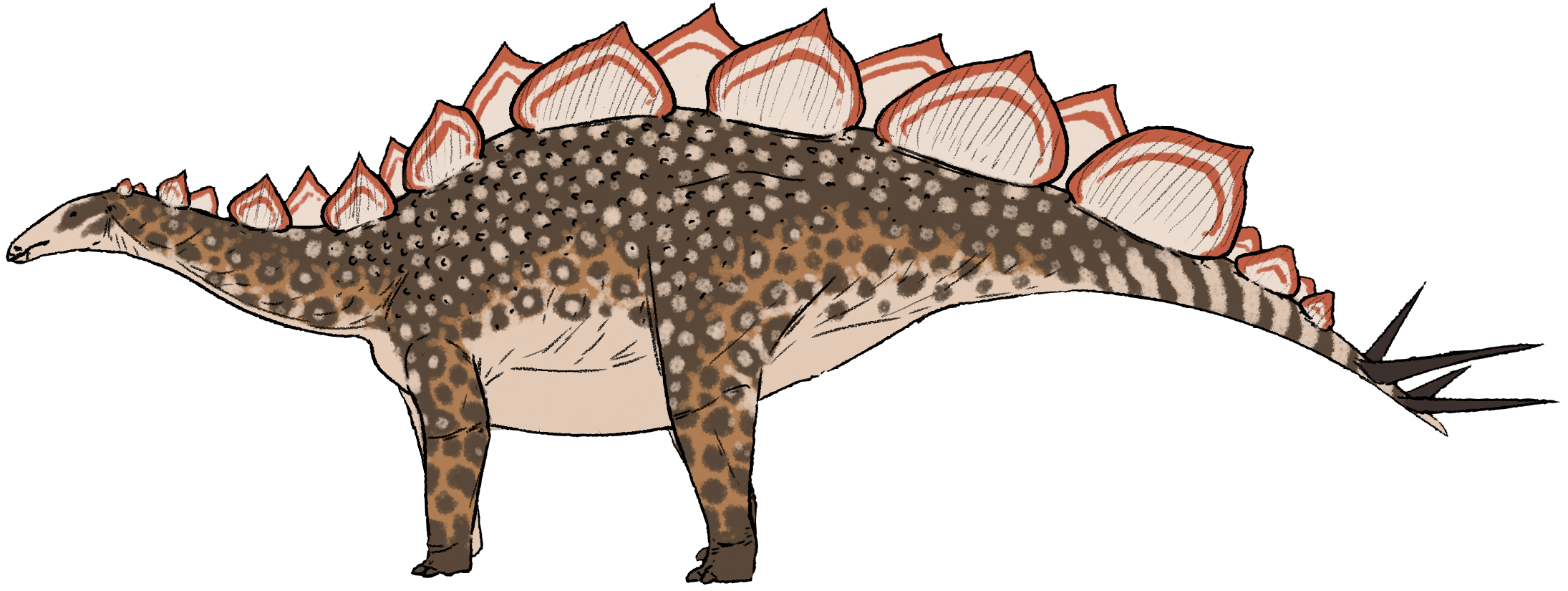
Artist's restoration of Wuerhosaurus.

==== 1973 ====
- Dong Zhiming described the new genus and species Wuerhosaurus homheni.

==== 1976 ====
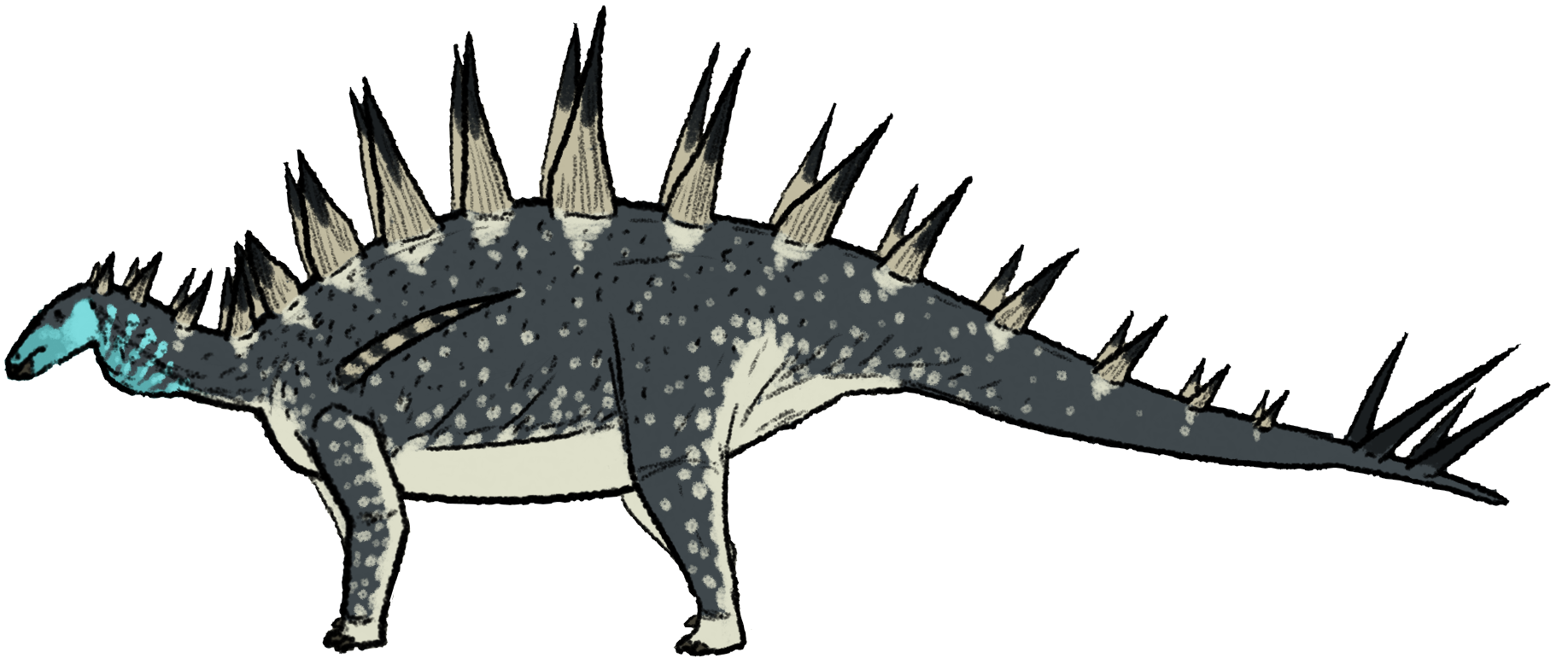
Artist's restoration of Tuojiangosaurus.

- James O. Farlow and others proposed that stegosaur plates were used to help regulate the animal's body temperature. Their alternating placement along its spine would allow them to dissipate its body heat by acting as forced-convection fins, the researchers argued.

==== 1977 ====
- Dong and others described the new genus and species Tuojiangosaurus multispinus.

==== 1978 ====
- Robert T. Bakker proposed that contrary to the prevailing interpretation of stegosaurs as low browsers, they were actually high browsers who fed on high foliage by rearing up on their hind limbs and propping themselves up in this position with their tail.
- Walter Coombs argued based on their limb anatomy that stegosaurs were graviportal animals.

==== 1979 ====
- P. M. Yadagiri and Krishnan Ayyasami described the new genus and species Dravidosaurus blanfordi based on fragmentary material assumed to include a skull and plates. Since it was dated to the Coniacian it would have been the most recent known surviving stegosaur taxon. The authors also reported the existence of Maastrichtian stegosaur remains, but they did not describe these fossils.
- Michael Seidel argued that while the plates of Stegosaurus were used to help regulate its body temperature, they were actually used to absorb heat rather than lose it as argued by Farlow and others in 1976.

=== 1980s ===
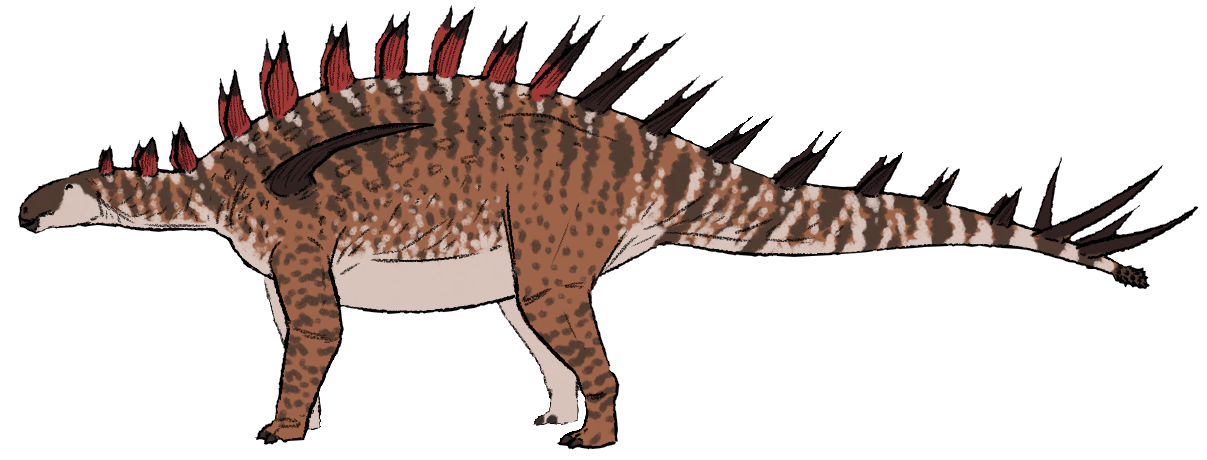
Artist's restoration of Huayangosaurus taibaii.

==== 1980 ====
- Dale Russell and others reconstructed the ancient environment of Tendaguru, Tanzania as a warm coastal area that sometimes experienced droughts. The stegosaur Kentrosaurus was present there, although not especially common. Its local fossil record consists largely of "medium-sized" members of the species.

==== 1981 ====
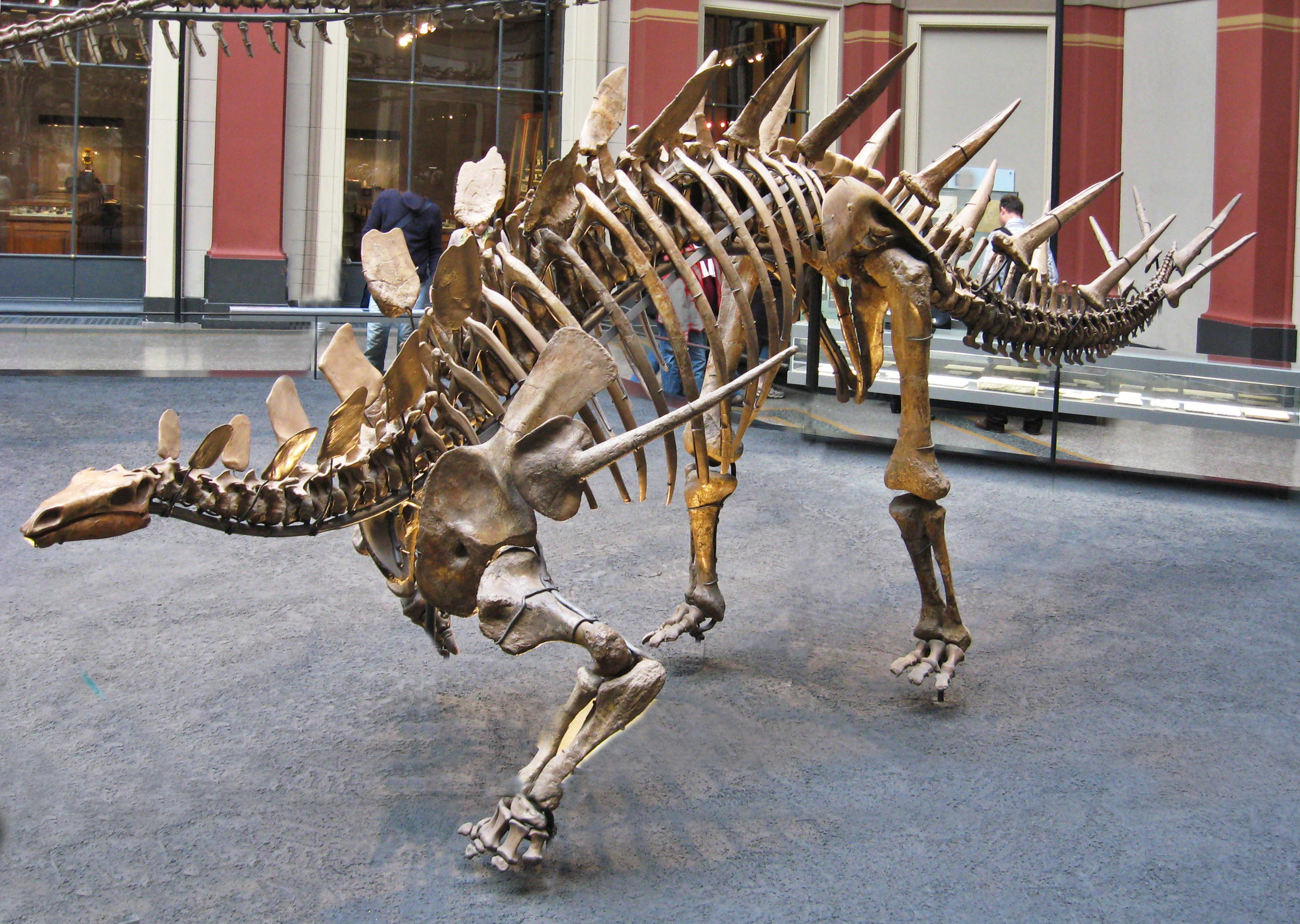
Skeletal mount of Kentrosaurus.

- Peter Malcolm Galton observed that stegosaurs were uncommon during the Cretaceous period.

==== 1982 ====
- Dong, Tang Zilu, and Zhou Shiwu described the new genus and species Huayangosaurus taibaii as well as the Huayangosauridae.
- Nikolaï Spassov argued that the plates of stegosaurs were used as display structures in competitions over mates. Their orientation made them best suited to being viewed from the side.
- Galton studied the growth and development of Stegosaurus.
- Galton found that Kentrosaurus came in two varieties, one with an extra sacral rib. He speculated that this morph with the extra sacral rib was the female and the other morph lacking the rib was male.

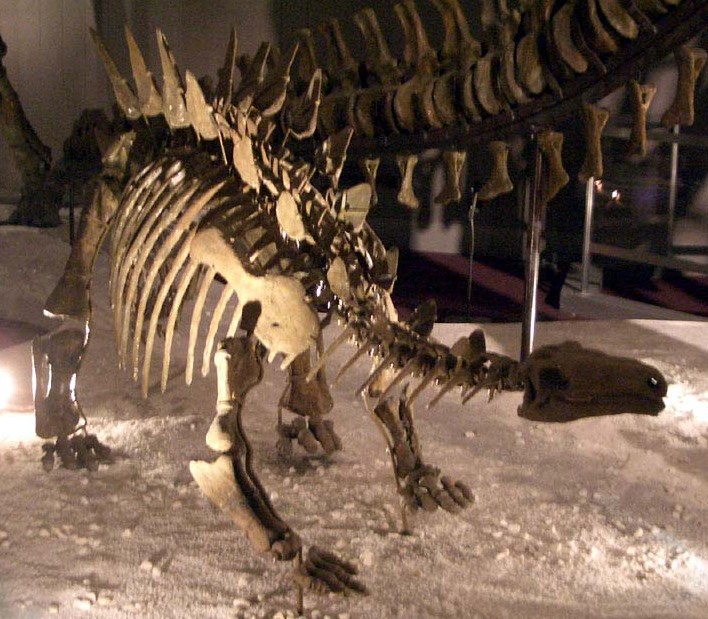
Skeletal mount of Chungkingosaurus jiangbeiensis.

- Ralph Molnar published more research on the possible Early Jurassic stegosaur track from Australia.
- Jacques Jenny and Jean-Arsène Jossen reported a possible Pliensbachian stegosaur trackway from Morocco.

==== 1983 ====
- Dong, Zhou and Zhang Yihong described the new genus and species Chungkingosaurus jiangbeiensis.
- Galton and Harry Philip Powell reported stegosaur armor and vertebrae from the Early Bajocian of England. These are among the oldest known stegosaur bones.
- Comic Artist Gary Larson humorously suggests the tail spikes on a stegosaur be named the Thagomizer.

==== 1984 ====
- Giuseppe Leonardi attributed Early Cretaceous footprints of the ichnogenus Caririchnium to stegosaurs.
- Zhou observed that the Bathonian to Callovian Huayangosaurus was among the oldest known stegosaur fossils.
- Vivian de Buffrénil and others studied the histology of a Stegosaurus plate. They concluded that since the Sharpey's fibers that anchored it within the animal's skin were symmetrical it could not be moved. They also argued that there was no physical evidence in the anatomy of the plate to suggest that it was covered by horn in life. The researchers dismissed the idea that the plates could function as armor on the grounds that they were too fragile. They also doubted that the plates were used as threat displays for intimidation because "they could not unfold suddenly". They found that the plates were more likely used as sexual displays to attract mates or help regulate the animal's body temperature. They proposed that the plates were covered by a skin dense with blood vessels that helped exchange heat by both convection and radiation. They argued that their hypothesis was compatible with both major competing interpretations of dinosaur thermophysiology since if Stegosaurus was cold-blooded the plates could be used to absorb heat while if it was warm-blooded the plates could shed the excess heat that its body produced.

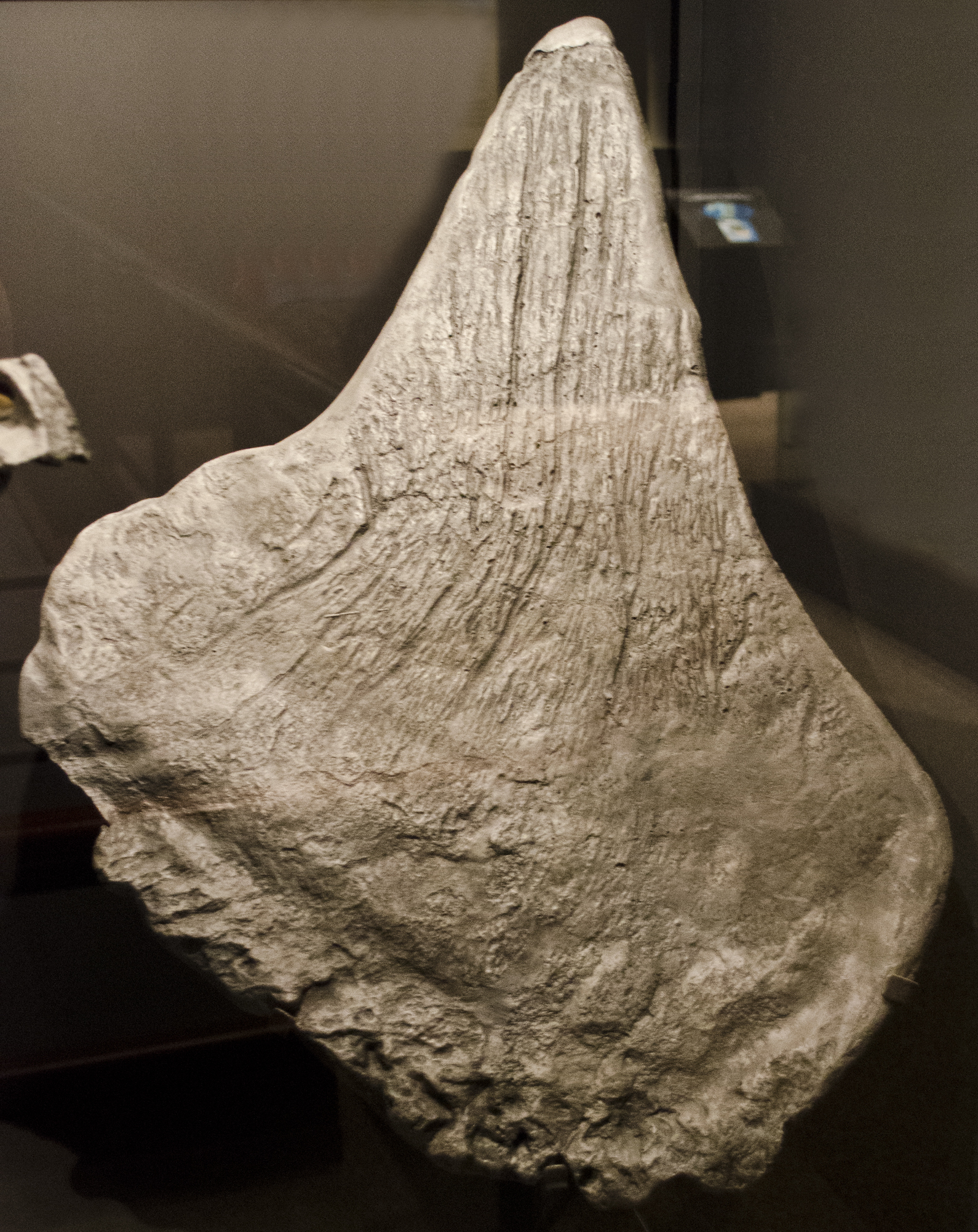
Stegosaurus back plate.

- David B.Weishampel observed that the stiff construction of the stegosaur skull rendered its jaws capable only of simple straight up-and-down movements. This distinguishes them from some other herbivorous dinosaur groups like ornithopods which were capable of complex chewing motions.
- Weishampel interpreted Stegosaurus as a browser whose diet consisted of low-growing foliage and "the fleshy parts of bennettitalean inflorescences plus the fructifications of Nilssoniales and Caytoniales plant groups."
- Xia Wei and others interpreted the ancient environment of the Lower Shaximiao Formation where Huayangosaurus was preserved as the still, shallow water of an ancient lake.

==== 1985 ====
- Daniel Brinkman and Conway studied the bone texture and mineralogy of stegosaur plates.
- Galton observed that the plates of Lexovisaurus were large, thin, and rich in blood vessels like Stegosaurus plates are.

==== 1986 ====
- Bakker expanded on his hypothesis that stegosaurs were high browsers that fed while rearing up on their hindlimbs. He also supported the idea that stegosaur plates were mobile armor that could defend the animal's back or flanks depending on what angle to which they were flexed. He also argued that the anatomy of the tail of Stegosaurus rendered it more flexible than that of other bird-hipped dinosaurs, whose tails were often stiffened by bony tendons. He hypothesized that Stegosaurus could "push off" using its massive chest muscles to turn its body about its back legs.
- Buffrénil and others studied the histology of a Stegosaurus plate. They concluded that since the Sharpey's fibers that anchored it within the animal's skin was symmetrical that it couldn't be moved. They also argued that there was no physical evidence in the anatomy of the plate to suggest that it was covered by horn in life. The researchers dismissed the idea that the plates could function as armor on the grounds that they were too fragile. They also doubted that the plates were used as threat displays for intimidation because "they could not unfold suddenly". They found that the plates were more likely used as sexual displays to attract mates or help regulate the animal's body temperature. They proposed that the plates were covered by a skin dense with blood vessels that helped exchange heat by both convection and radiation. They argued that their hypothesis was compatible with both major competing interpretations of dinosaur thermophysiology since if Stegosaurus was cold-blooded the plates could be used to absorb heat while if it was warm-blooded the plates could shed the excess heat that its body produced.

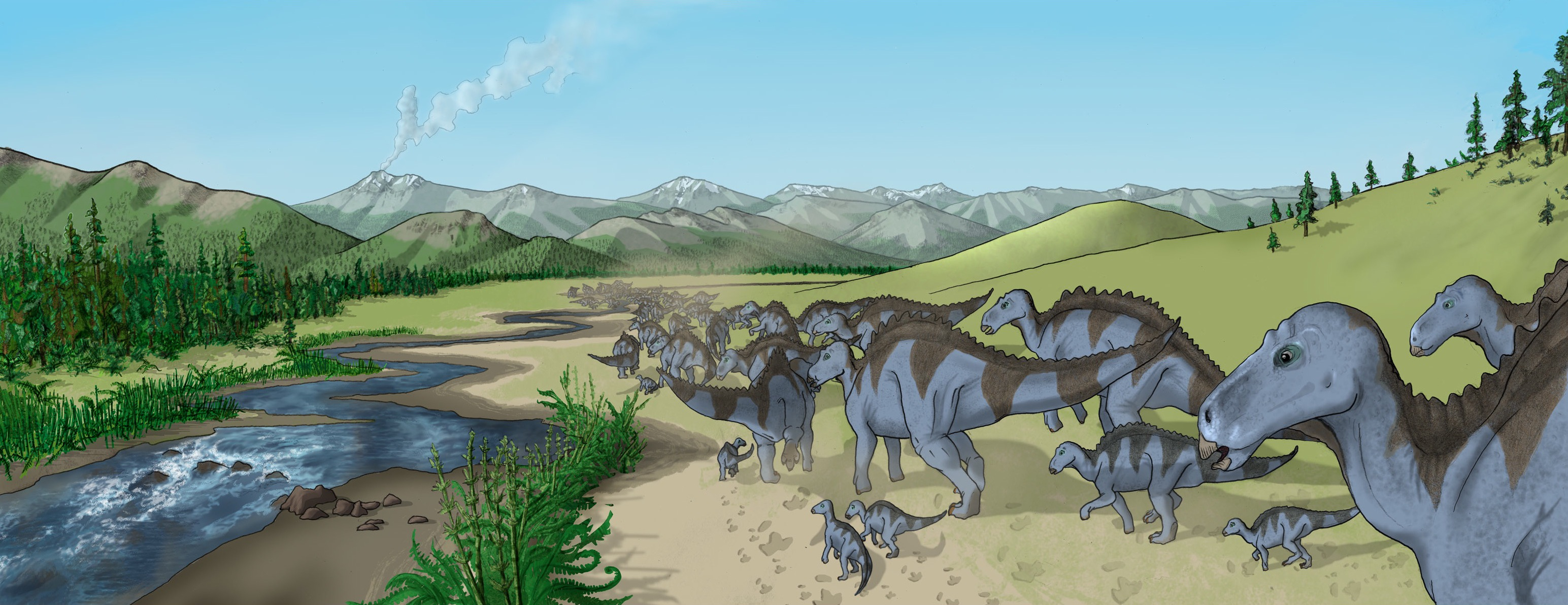
Tracks supposedly left by stegosaurs in South America may actually have been left by hadrosaurs.

==== 1987 ====
- Martin Lockley disputed Leonardi's attribution of the Brazilian Caririchnium tracks to stegosaurs. Instead, Lockley concluded that they were left by hadrosaurs walking on all fours.
- Farlow examined the possible distinct feeding strategies exploited by stegosaurs that enabled them to flourish alongside other ornithischians during the Middle and Late Jurassic.
- Malcolm James Coe and others disputed Bakker's reinterpretation of stegosaurs as high browsers, observing that even if stegosaurs were capable of rearing like Bakker portrays, that it doesn't imply it was their normal feeding posture since elephants are also physically capable of standing on their hind limbs but do not feed in this stance. Instead, Coe and the other researchers supported the traditional view of Stegosaurus as feeding on plants one meter high or less.

=== 1990s ===
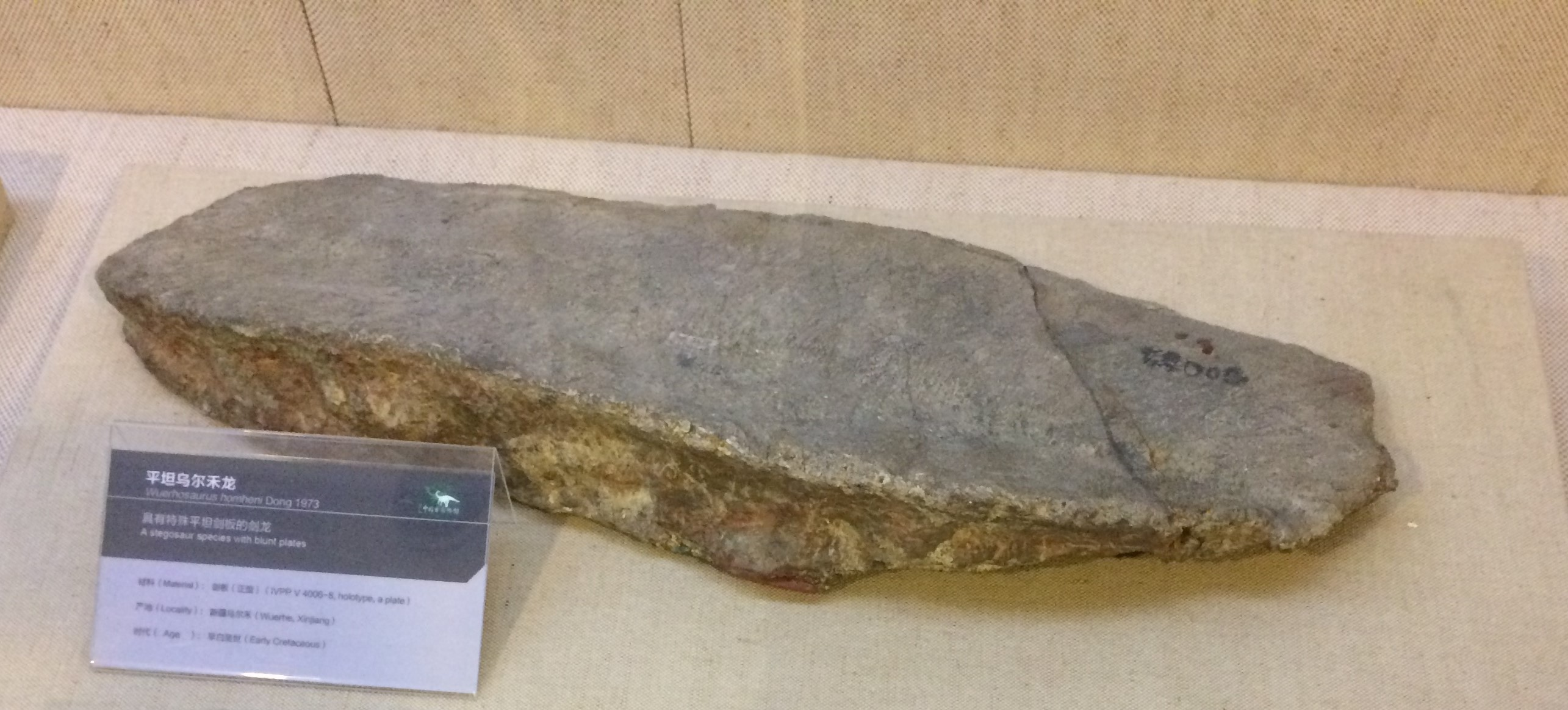
Wuerhosaurus back plate

==== 1990 ====
- Dong published the new genus and species name Monkonosaurus lawulacus but attributed it to Zhou.

==== 1991 ====
- Dayton reported possible Early Cretaceous stegosaur footprints from Australia.

==== 1992 ====
- Boneham and Forsey reported stegosaur armor and vertebrae from the Early Bajocian of England. These are among the oldest known stegosaur bones.

==== 1993 ====
- Dong described the new species Wuerhosaurus ordosensis.
- Kenneth Carpenter uses Thagomizer formally to describe stegosaur tail spikes, moving the term from humor to informal designation of the anatomy.

==== 1994 ====
- Sara Metcalf and Rachel Walker reported a stegosaur tooth from the early Bajocian of England. It is among the oldest known stegosaur remains.

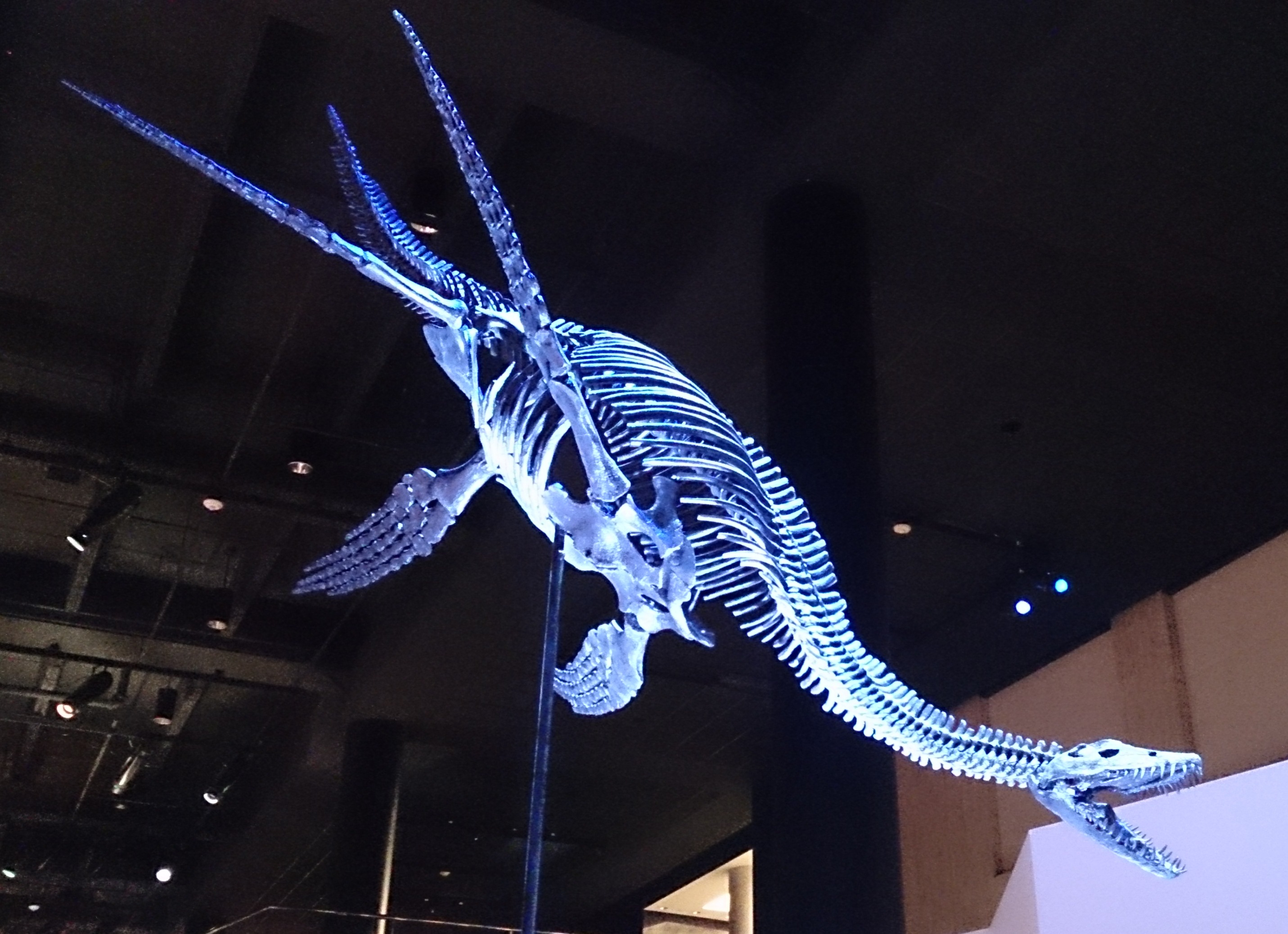
Dravidosaurus may have actually been a plesiosaur (pictured).

- Zhu describes the new genus and species Yingshanosaurus jichuanensis.

==== 1996 ====
- José Fernando Bonaparte reported fragmentary Early Cretaceous stegosaur remains from Argentina.
- Bonaparte reported fragmentary Early Cretaceous stegosaur remains from Argentina.
- Sankar Chatterjee and Dhiraj Kumar Rudra argued that Dravidosaurus was actually a plesiosaur rather than a stegosaur.

==== 1997 ====
- Chatterjee expanded on his argument that Dravidosaurus was actually a plesiosaur rather than a stegosaur, however he did not provide concrete reasons for the assessment.
- Thulborn reported possible Early Cretaceous stegosaur footprints from Australia.
- Tracy Popowics and Mikael Fortelius reported wear facets on stegosaur teeth caused by physical interactions between teeth.

==== 1998 ====
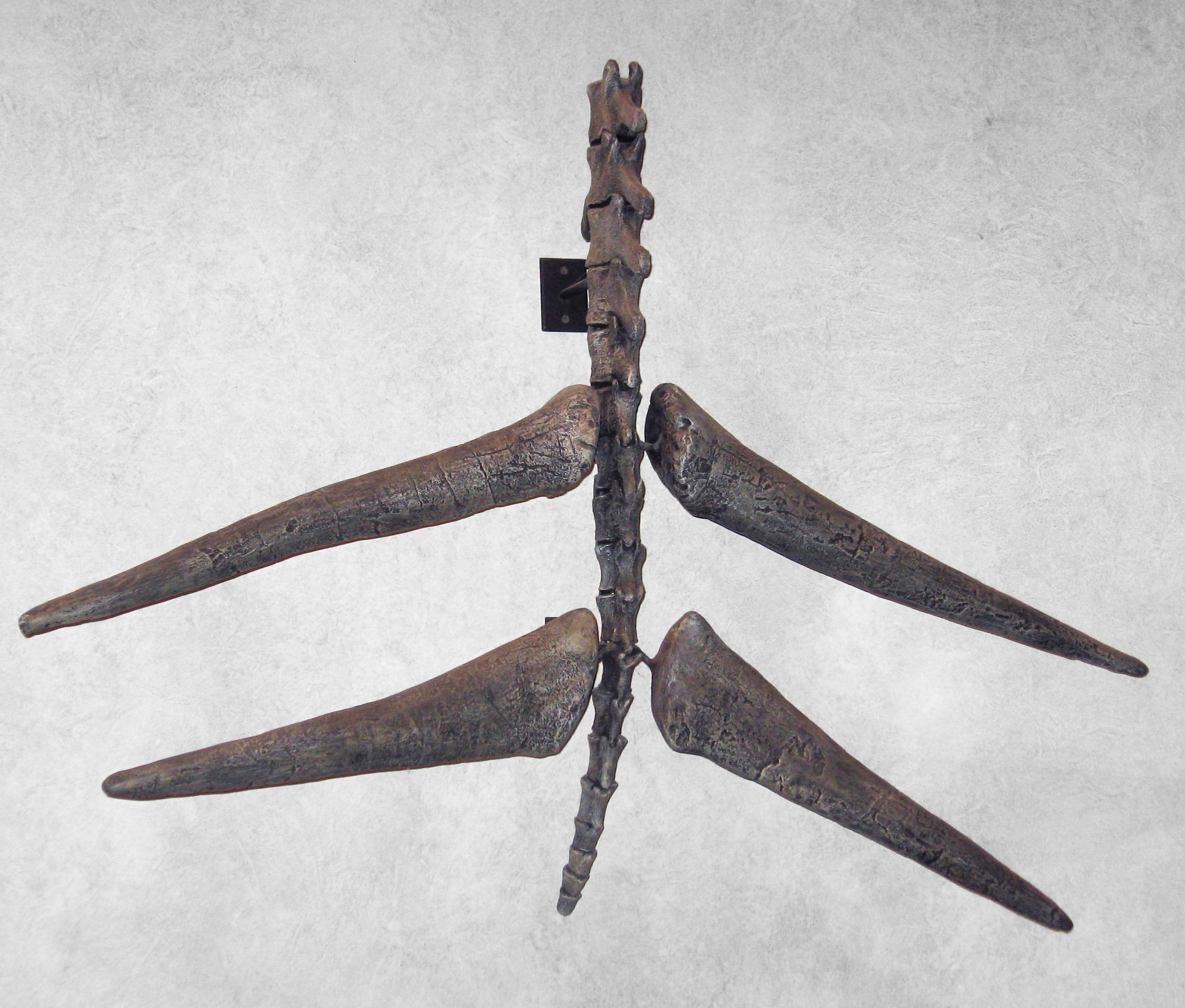
Stegosaurus tail spikes.

- Paul Sereno proposed a stem-based definition of Stegosauria that included all taxa more closely related to Stegosaurus than to Ankylosauria.
- Kenneth Carpenter disputed Bakker's reinterpretation of Stegosaurs as high browsers. He argued that the plates along the animal's tail made it too rigid to be used as the third "leg" of the tripodal stance needed to support it in the rearing posture Bakker imagined stegosaurs adopted to reach high foliage. He noted that the first vertebra in the tail had a wedge shape that fit under a backward-facing projection of bone from the top of the last vertebra in the pelvis. This configuration would have held the tail out straight from the animal's body. Its other tail vertebrae show anatomical evidence for ligaments that would have assisted in keeping the tail aloft. Carpenter concluded that while the plates limited the mobility between individual vertebrae, the tail itself had enough range of motion to swing its spiked tip to an angle exceeding ninety degree from a resting position.

==== 1999 ====
- Sereno continued to use the stem-based definition of Stegosauria he proposed in 1998.
- Jean Le Loeuff and others reported some fossil footprints from France that may have been left behind by stegosaurs. As these tracks date back to the Hettangian, they may represent the oldest known stegosaur fossils.
- Wolf-Dieter Heinrich observed that stegosaur bones were common in Quarry X at Tendaguru, Tanzania. He interpreted the deposit as resulting from the gradual accumulation of remains in a fresh-to-brackish water environment.
- Stephen A. Czerkas argued that the beak near the front of the jaws of stegosaurs like Chungkingosaurus, Kentrosaurus, and Stegosaurus actually extended along the entire length of the jaw, like in turtles.
- Galton argued that stegosaurs were sexually dimorphic and the females had extra rib in their sacra.

== 21st century ==
=== 2000s ===
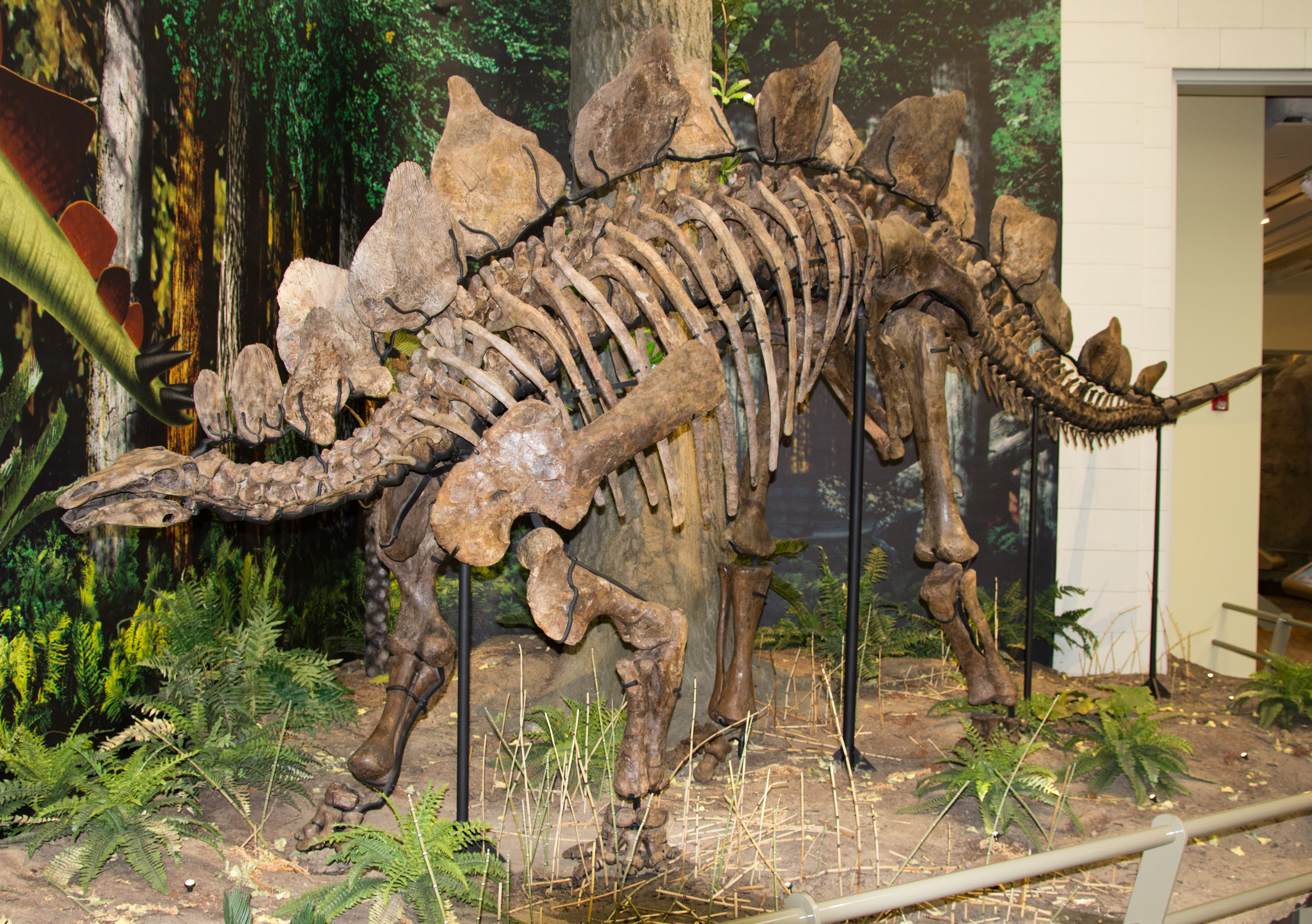
Main and others argued that Stegosaurus did not use its plates to regulate its body temperature.

==== 2000 ====
- Lockley and Christian Andreas Meyer published more research on the possible Hettangian stegosaur footprints from France.

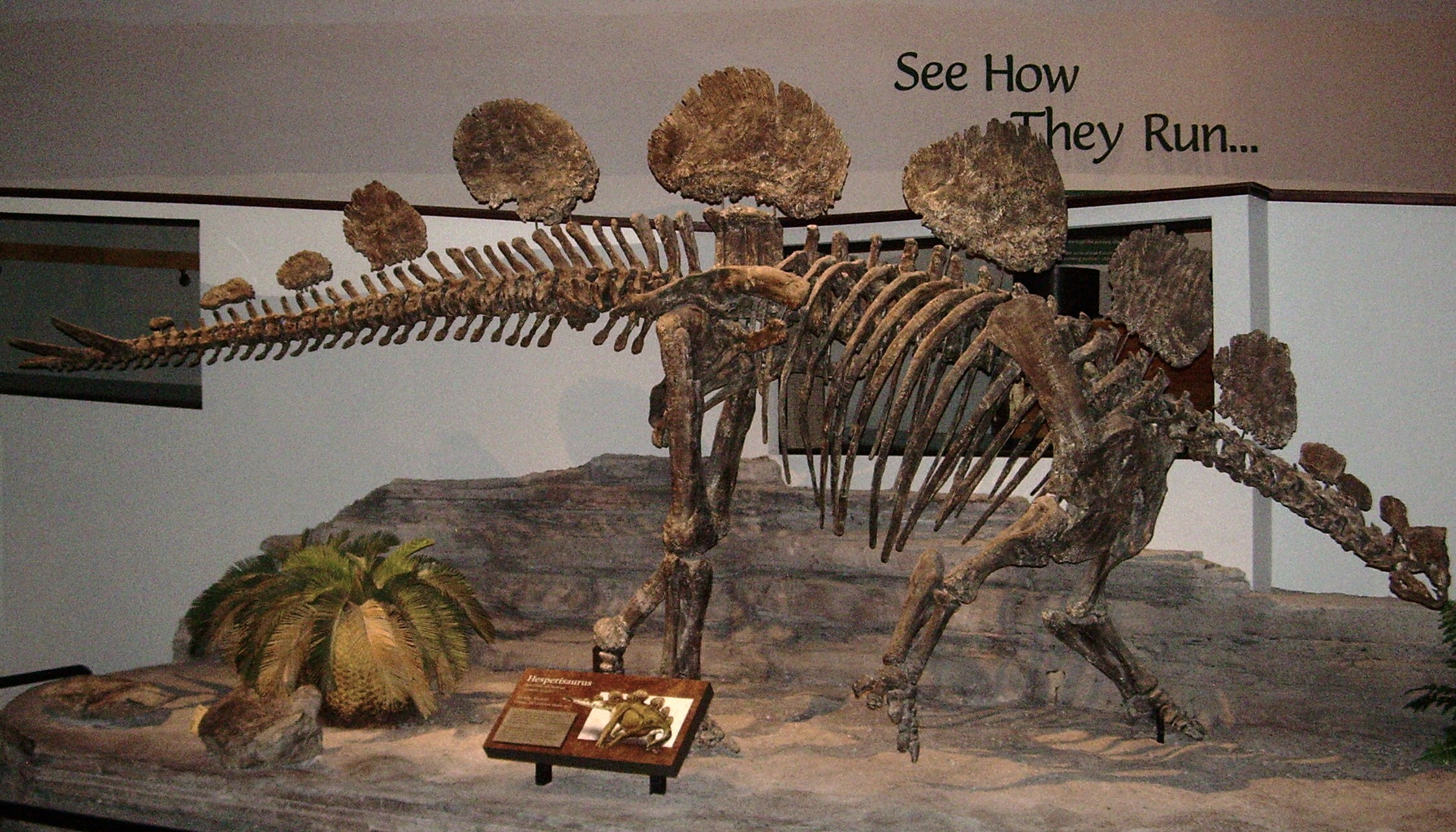
Skeletal mount of Hesperosaurus mjosi.

- Russell Main and others disputed the idea that Stegosaurus used its plates to help regulate its body temperature because other kinds of stegosaurs have differently shaped plates. Instead they argued that these were display structures that helped stegosaurs recognize and acquire mates of their own species. The researchers also examined the histology of stegosaur plates. They found that during development the plates and spikes grew mainly from their bases and the structure of their interiors changed significantly as the animal matured. They hypothesized that stegosaur plates evolved by greatly expanding the raised keel of bone that ran the length of the nodules of bone embedded in the skin of armored dinosaurs. They concluded that processes of growth are the main reason why stegosaur plates showed so many signs of the presence of blood vessels instead of using the blood vessels to absorb or shed heat. They also noticed that structures in other dinosaur groups and even modern mammals like artiodactyls unrelated to heat regulation like horns and frills often show similar amount of vasculature to stegosaur plates.

==== 2001 ====
- Paul Michael Barrett found further anatomical support for the hypothesis that stegosaur jaws were only capable of opening and closing in a straight up-an-down fashion that precluded the complex chewing motions seen in some other herbivorous dinosaur groups. He concluded that the tooth-tooth wear facets reported by Popowics and Fortelius only formed as a result of teeth growing in at slightly different angles rather than tooth-tooth contact occurring as part of the animals' natural feeding strategy.
- Carpenter, Clifford Miles, and Karen Cloward described the new genus and species Hesperosaurus mjosi.
- Neil Donald Lewis Clark reported the discovery of near ends of a radius and ulna from Early Bajocian rocks in Scotland. Although they might be ankylosaur fossils, these are likely to be some of the oldest known stegosaur bones.
- Éric Buffetaut and others reported a stegosaur vertebra from Thailand. This was the first scientifically recognized stegosaur fossil from southeast Asia.
- William Blows reported Cretaceous stegosaur dermal armor from England.
- Darren Naish and David Martill reported Cretaceous stegosaur dermal armor from England.
- Galton and Paul Upchurch accepted Dravidosaurus as a stegosaur while dismissing the arguments made by Chatterjee and Rudma in the 1990s that it was actually a plesiosaur.

==== 2004 ====
- The Dinosauria's second edition reevaluated Dravidosaurus blanfordi as a stegosaur/plesiosaur chimera.

==== 2007 ====
- Jia Chengkai and others described the new genus and species Jiangjunosaurus junggarensis.

==== 2008 ====
- Susannah C. R. Maidment and others described the new genus Loricatosaurus.

==== 2009 ====
- Octávio Mateus, Maidment, and Nicolai A. Christiansen described the new genus and species Miragaia longicollum.

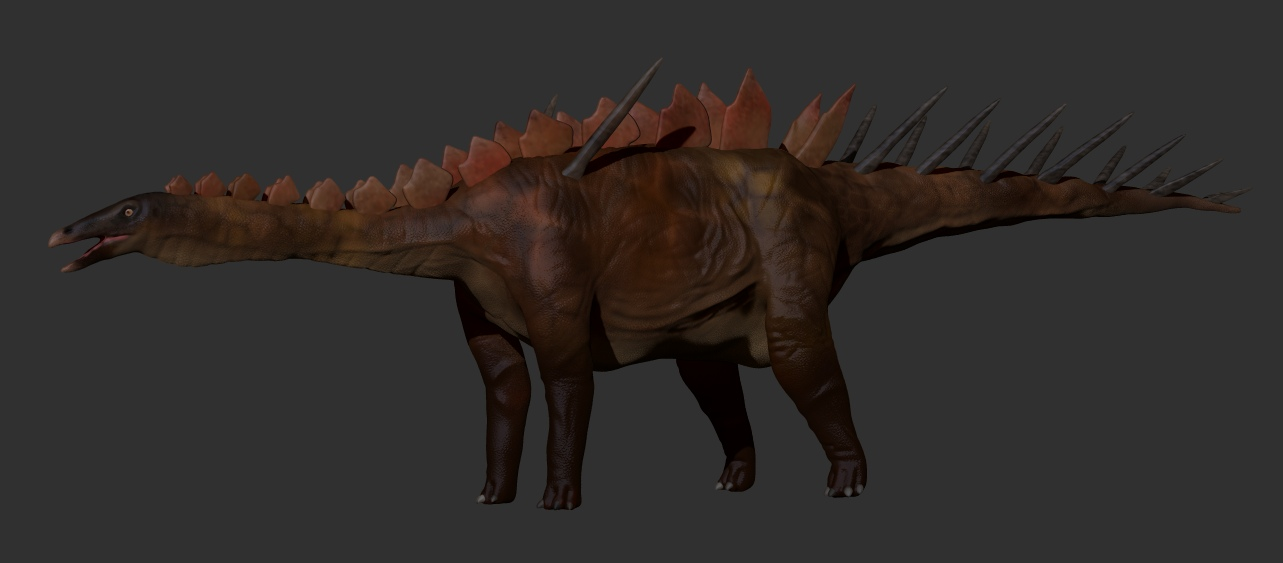
Artist's restoration of Miragaia longicollum.

=== 2010s ===
==== 2015 ====
- Robert P. Cameron, John A. Cameron and Stephen M. Barnett recognised that Stegosaurus exhibited exterior chirality and highlighted the need to distinguish a specimen from its distinct, hypothetical mirror-image form.

==== 2016 ====
- Galton and Carpenter described the new genus Alcovasaurus for the species "Stegosaurus" longispinus.
- R. Cameron, J. Cameron, and Barnett published another paper on exterior chirality in Stegosaurus.

==== 2018 ====
- Tumanova and Alifanov described the new genus and species Mongolostegus exspectabilis.

==== 2019 ====
- A study on the morphological diversity of stegosaurs through the evolutionary history of the group will be published by Romano (2019).
- A study on pathological characteristics of left femur of a specimen of Gigantspinosaurus sichuanensis from the Late Jurassic of China will be published by Hao et al. (2019), who interpret this specimen as probably affected by bone tumor.

=== 2020s ===
==== 2020 ====
- Maidment and others described the new genus and species Adratiklit boulahfa.

==== 2022 ====
- A new older stegosaur was found in Zigong Dinosaur Museum's Dinosaur Fossil Wall and named Bashanosaurus.

==== 2024 ====
- Sánchez-Fenollosa and others described a new stegosaurian skeleton from the Upper Jurassic of Europe (one of the most complete specimens) and performed a comprehensive taxonomic assessment of all the material not attributed to Stegosaurus from the Upper Jurassic of Europe. The results obtained had strong implications for the taxonomy, diversity and abundance of European stegosaurs.

== See also ==
- History of paleontology
  - Timeline of paleontology
- Timeline of ankylosaur research
