= Loura =

Loura may refer to:

- Mount Loura, northern Guinea
- Lou Yixiao (born 1988), Chinese actress and singer also known as Loura Lou
- Chhotu Loura, Indian boxer, bronze medalist at the 2006 Women's World Amateur Boxing Championships

== See also ==
- Mark DeLoura (born 1969 or 1970), American video gaming advocate and an author
- Lura (disambiguation)
- Lööra, a village in Estonia
