= Monkonosaurus =

Monkonosaurus Temporal range: Late Jurassic, 163–152.01 Ma

Scientific classification
- Kingdom: Animalia
- Phylum: Chordata
- Class: Reptilia
- Clade: Dinosauria
- Clade: †Ornithischia
- Clade: †Thyreophora
- Clade: †Stegosauria
- Genus: †Monkonosaurus; Dong, 1990
- Species: †M. lawulacus

Binomial name
- †Monkonosaurus lawulacus Dong, 1990

Extinct genus of dinosaurs

Monkonosaurus (meaning "Monkon lizard") is a dubious genus of herbivorous stegosaurian dinosaur from the Late Jurassic/Early Cretaceous-aged Loe-ein Formation of Tibet (or the Early Cretaceous Lura Formation of China). Some sources place it as alive during the Oxfordian - Albian stages, around 163 - 100 million years ago, although Monkonosaurus was probably only alive during the Late Jurassic (163 – 152.1 ± 0.9 million years ago), making it among the earliest known stegosaurs along with Chungkingosaurus and Bashanosaurus.

== Discovery and naming ==
The genus was formalized by Zhao Xijin in 1986. The generic name refers to Markam County, also known as Monko. Zhao at the time gave neither a description, meaning the name remained a nomen nudum, nor a specific name. The latter was provided in 1986 when the type species Monkonosaurus lawulacus was named, the epithet referring to the Lawushan, the Lawu mountains. The first description was provided in 1990 by Dong Zhiming.

The holotype, IVPP V 6975, was found in a layer of the Loe-ein Formation dating probably from the Late Jurassic, or from the Early Cretaceous Lura Formation. It consists of a partial skeleton lacking the skull. It contains a pelvis with sacrum, two vertebrae and three back plates. The fragmentary condition of this single skeleton places doubt on the validity of this genus, with some studies concluding it is a nomen dubium.

== Description ==
Monkonosaurus was about 5 metres (16 ft) long when fully grown. The ilium has a length of 905 millimetres. The sacrum consists of five sacral vertebrae.

== Classification ==
Zhao (1983) placed Monkonosaurus in the now obsolete Oligosacralosauroidea. Later researchers considered it an indeterminate member of the Stegosauridae.

== See also ==
- Timeline of stegosaur research
