= Lura Formation =

Geological formation in China

- Stratigraphic range: Early Cretaceous, ~120–100 Ma
- Type: Geological formation
- Overlies: Loe-ein Formation

Location
- Region: Asia
- Country: China

The Lura Formation is a geological formation in western China, which outcrops in Tibet, whose strata date back to the Early Cretaceous. Dinosaur remains are among the fossils that have been recovered from the formation.

== Vertebrate paleofauna ==
- Tetanurae indet.
- ?Coelurosauria indet. (="Microvenator chagyabi")
- Sauropoda indet. (=cf. Asiatosaurus kwangshiensis)
- Monkonosaurus lawulacus? - "[Two] vertebrae, sacrum with illia, [three] plates, adult. (possibly found instead in the overlying Loe-ein Formation)"

== See also ==
- List of dinosaur-bearing rock formations
