= Jeong Yura =

Jeong Yura (Korean: 정유라) may refer to:

- Jung Yu-ra (born 1992), South Korean handballer
- Chung Yoo-ra (born 1996), South Korean equestrian
