= Yura River =

Yura River may refer to:

- Yura River (Bolivia)
- Yura River (Japan)

== See also ==
- Yula (river)
