= Whitehill Formation =

Early Permian geological formation in South Africa

- Stratigraphic range: Artinskian-Kungurian; ~282.6–275 Ma
- Type: Geological formation
- Unit of: Ecca Group
- Sub-units: Khabus Tuff
- Underlies: Collingham & Tierberg Formations
- Overlies: Prince Albert Formation
- Area: 600 km × 600 km (370 mi × 370 mi)
- Thickness: 50–70 m (160–230 ft)

Lithology
- Primary: Black shale, dolomite, mudstone
- Other: Gypsum, halite, tuff, dolerite (intrusions)

Location
- Coordinates: 21.2°S 14.1°E
- Approximate paleocoordinates: 51.0°S 30.5°W
- Region: ǁKaras Region; Eastern, Northern & Western Cape
- Country: Namibia; South Africa
- Extent: Nama & Karoo Basins
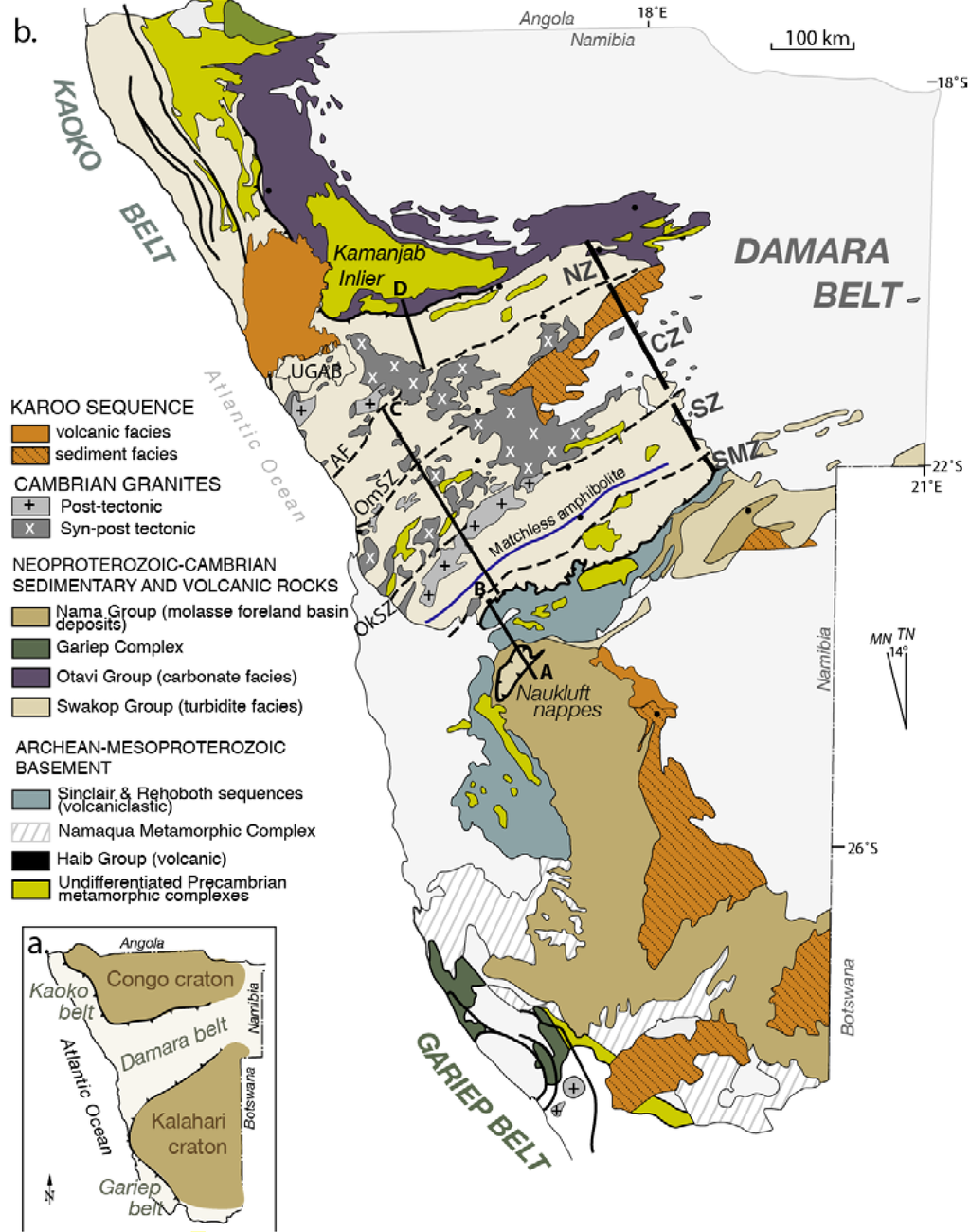
- Geologic map of Namibia with the Whitehill Formation partly cropping out in the southeastern area (orange)

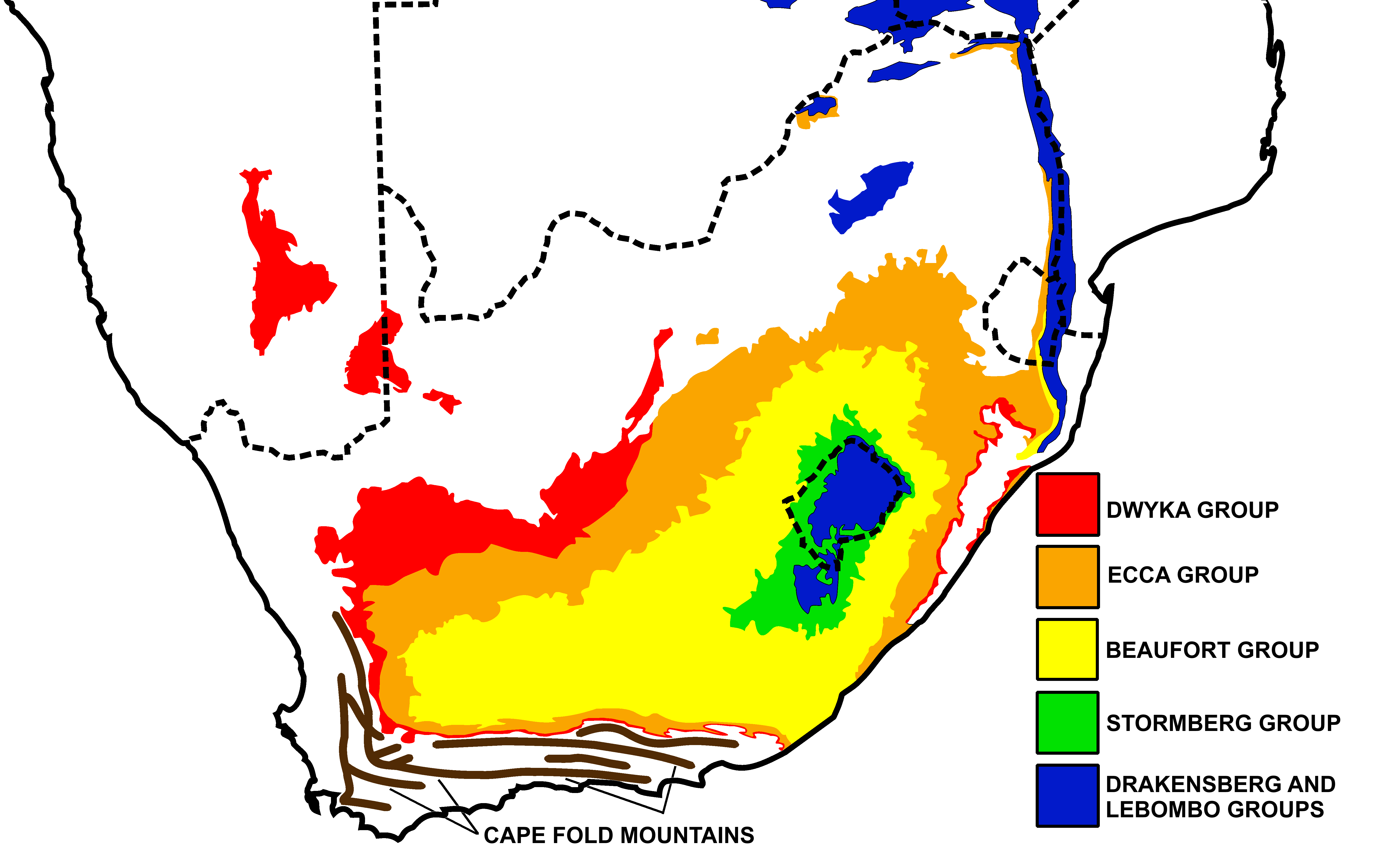
Extent of outcrops of the Ecca Group in South Africa in orange, the group is also found in the subsurface underneath the Beaufort Group in yellow

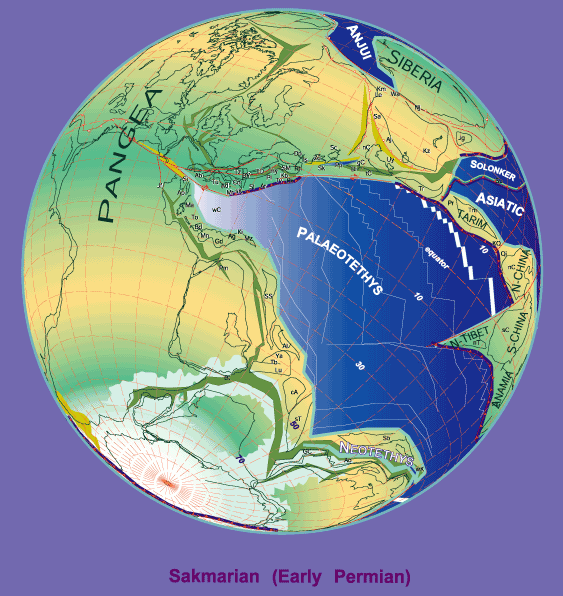
Early Permian paleogeography (280 Ma)

The Whitehill Formation, alternatively written as White Hill Formation and formerly known as White Band or Whitehill or White Hill Member, is a regional Early Permian (Artinskian to Kungurian, dating to around 282 to 275 Ma) geologic formation belonging to the Ecca Group in the southeastern ǁKaras Region of southeastern Namibia and Eastern, Northern and Western Cape provinces of South Africa.

The formation comprises black shales, mudstones, siltstones, dolomite beds, gypsum and halite layers and a layer of tuff within the formation. With a thickness between 50 and 70 metres (160 and 230 ft) and present in an area of 600 by 600 kilometres (370 by 370 mi), the formation is considered the primary target for shale gas potential in the Southern Karoo. Total Organic Carbon (TOC) values average 4.5% with a range from 0.5 to 14.7%, placing the formation in the same range as the well-known Barnett Shale and Marcellus Formation of the United States.

The Whitehill Formation of the Karoo and Nama or Kalahari Basin is contemporaneous with the Huab Formation of the Huab Basin and is correlated with a series of formations in the Pelotas and Paraná Basins in southeastern Brazil, deposited in a larger basinal area, 150 million years before the break-up of Pangea. The abundance of Glossopteris and Mesosaurus fossils are characteristic of the Gondwanan correlation across present-day South America, Africa, Antarctica and Australia. The Whitehill Formation has provided fossil reptiles, insects, fish and flora.

== Description ==
The Whitehill Formation is an extensive Lower Permian unit, cropping out in a thin band stretching from the Western Cape in South Africa through southeastern Namibia and the Northern Cape in the north to the Eastern Cape of South Africa in the east. The formation is found at the edge of the Karoo Basin at distances of 600 kilometres (370 mi) north to south and east to west. The formation is part of the Karoo Supergroup, more precisely the Ecca Group, where it overlies the Prince Albert Formation and is overlain by the Collingham Formation, and in the southern Karoo by the Tierberg Formation.

Single zircon U-Pb SHRIMP dating yielded an age of 279.1 ± 1.5 Ma for the Uhabis River Tuff present in the upper strata of the underlying Prince Albert Formation. The Khabus Tuff within the Whitehill Formation provided a weighted mean ^{206}Pb/^{238}U age of 280.5 ± 2.1 Ma. Other authors use an estimated age for the whole formation of around 275 Ma.

In the central part of the Karoo Basin, the formation ranges in thickness from 50 to 70 metres (160 to 230 ft) and is highly organic with up to 14 weight percent of Total Organic Carbon (TOC). The formation is highly conductive and can be traced in seismic profiles across nearly the whole basin.

=== Lithologies ===
The Whitehill Formation has been subdivided into two major subunits according to their weathering color in outcrops. The lower and thicker part consists mainly of bluish- to greenish-grey shales and mudstones, which grade upward into more light brownish, buff weathering, slightly coarser grained siltstones. This zone is conformably overlain by white weathering shales, with intermittent chert lenses and pyritic stringers; the latter rarely exceeding 20 millimetres (0.79 in) in thickness. The sedimentary structure is generally massive, however laminations do occur that resemble algal lamellae. The formation appears white due to weathering of pyrite (sulfide) at surface to sulfate (gypsum). This section is grading upward into dark carbonaceous, bluish-grey weathering shales. From a lithological point of view only the upper part of the succession consists of the Whitehill-characteristic carbonaceous black shales.

A tuffaceous zone occurs within the Whitehill Formation a few metres below the stratigraphic interval, which contains several dolomitic limestones. This limestone interval forms a mappable unit in all outcrops of the Whitehill Formation in central southern Namibia. In the Northern Cape, the formation is intruded by dolerite sills. The sediments are considered to be deposited in an anoxic environment. Besides pyrite, the shales contain dolomite lenses near the base. The rocks are highly folded and faulted by the Cape orogeny forming the Cape Fold Belt, and thus, interpreted as "decollement".

=== Depositional environments ===
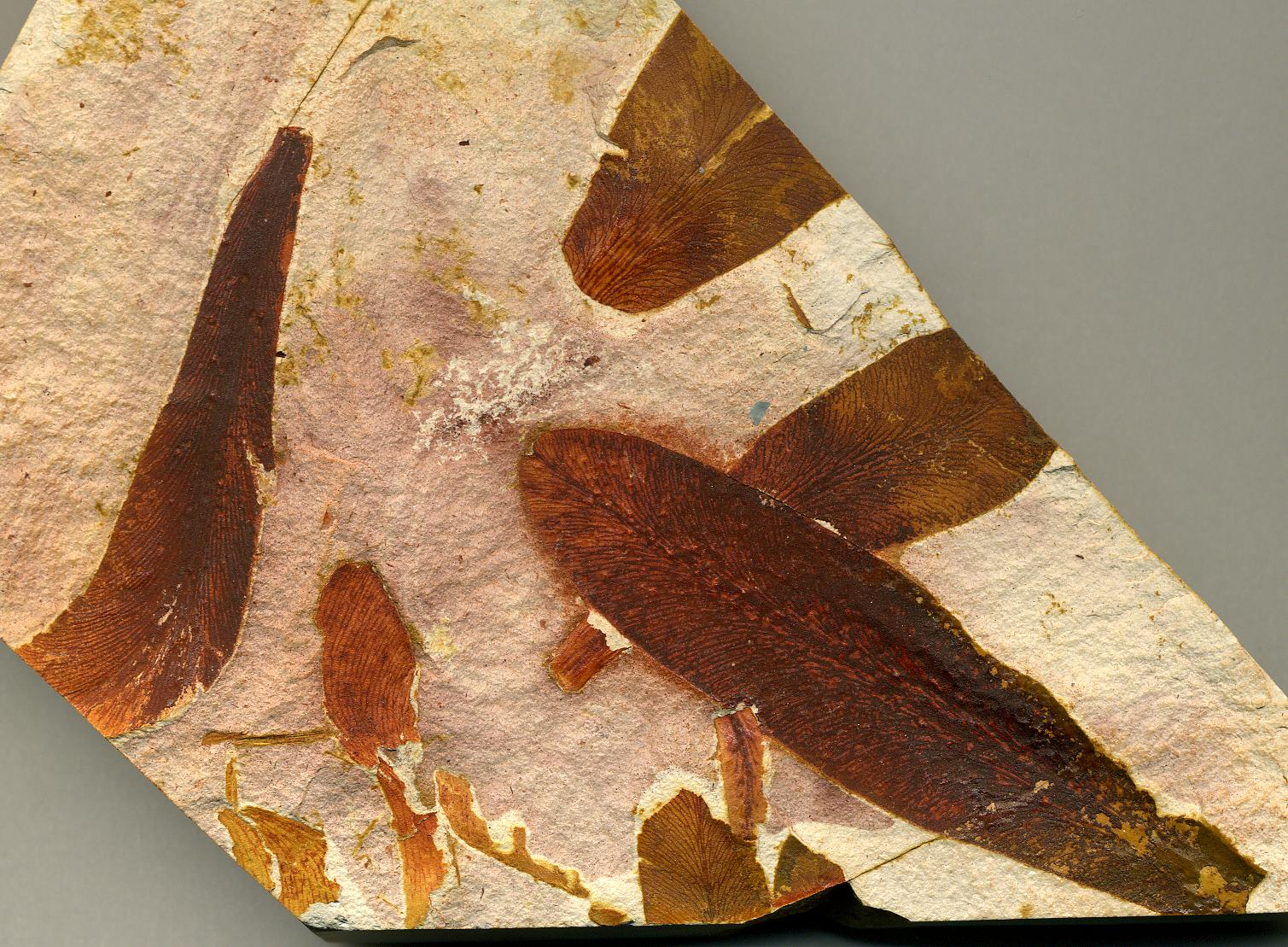
Glossopteris (Illawarra Coal Measures, Australia)

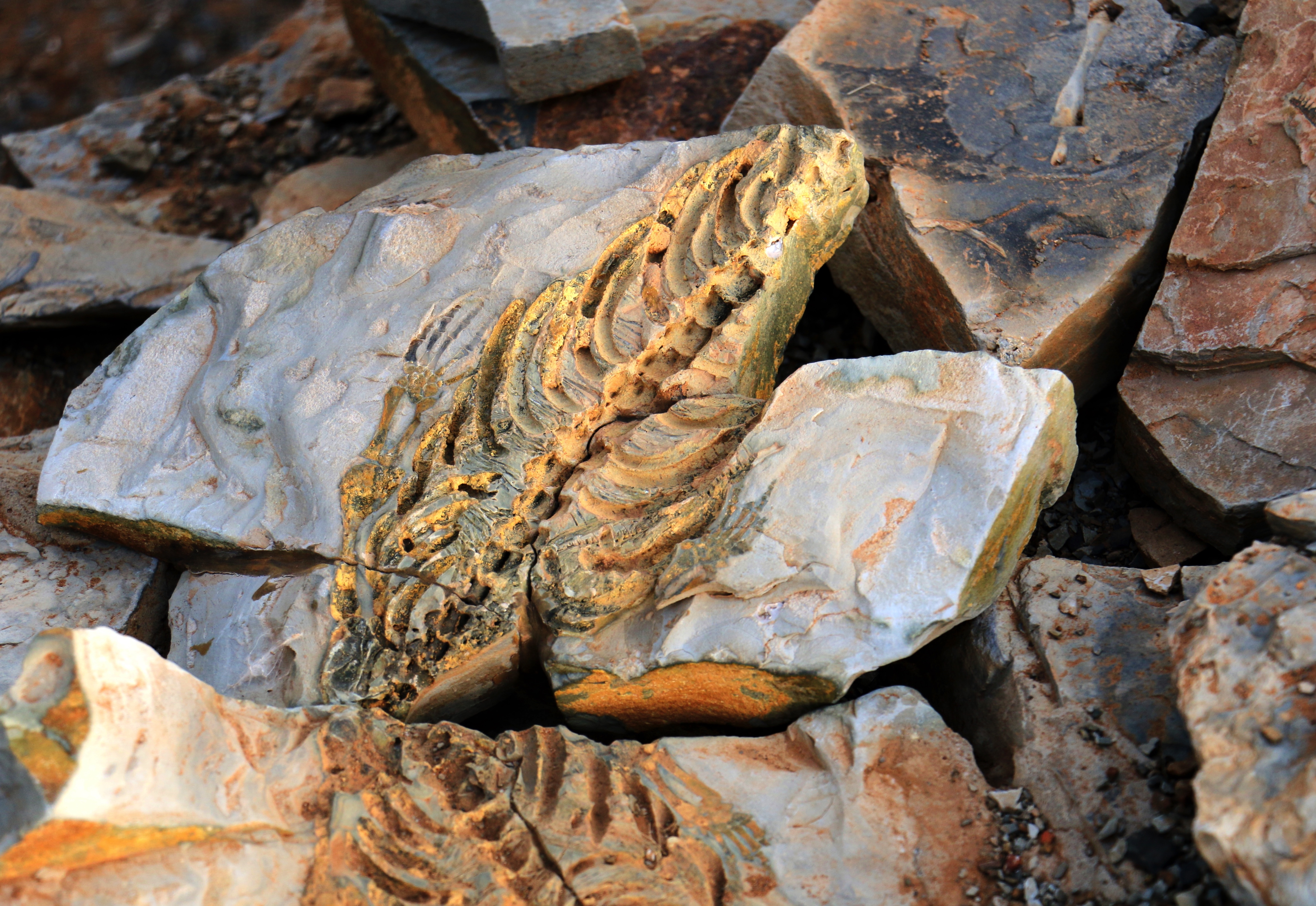
Mesosaurus (Whitehill Formation)

Glossopteris and Mesosaurus, characteristic flora and fauna for the Permian of Gondwana

The Whitehill Formation was deposited in a shallow inland sea with little to no connection to the open ocean. This sea, stretching from the Paraná Basin in current southeastern Brazil to the Karasberg and Karoo Basins of southwestern Africa, probably represents the transition from marine to brackish or freshwater conditions, in sediment-starved, stratified and anoxic embayments.

From outcrops in southernmost Namibia (Aussenkjer-Noordoewer area) it became evident that the boundary between the Prince Albert and the Whitehill Formation represents the turning point from a progradational to a retrogradational succession. The tuffs within the Whitehill Formation, as well as other tuffaceous beds found in the underlying and overlying formations, were possibly sourced by volcanoes located in present-day South America, although other interpretations of the tuffs of the Dwyka and Ecca Groups propose a general source along the southern Panthalassian margin of current southern Africa.

=== Correlations ===
The Whitehill Formation is time equivalent with the Pietermaritzburg Formation of the Waterberg Basin of southern Namibia. To the north in the Karoo Basin, the shales of the Whitehill Formation are laterally equivalent with the Vryheid Formation. The upper part of the formation is correlated with the Irati Formation of the Paraná and Pelotas Basins in Rio Grande do Sul, Brazil, the Black Rock Member of the Falkland Islands, and with the Huab Formation in the Huab Basin of northwestern Namibia. The lower section correlates with the Palermo and Rio Bonito Formations of the Paraná Basin and the Prince Albert Formation of the Karoo. The Permian sequence in the Huab Basin is much thinner than those of the Paraná and Karoo Basins. The fossil assemblages of Glossopteris and Mesosaurus are known from other parts of Gondwana; the Vryheid Formation of South Africa and coal deposits of the Lower Permian in Australia.

=== Fossil content ===
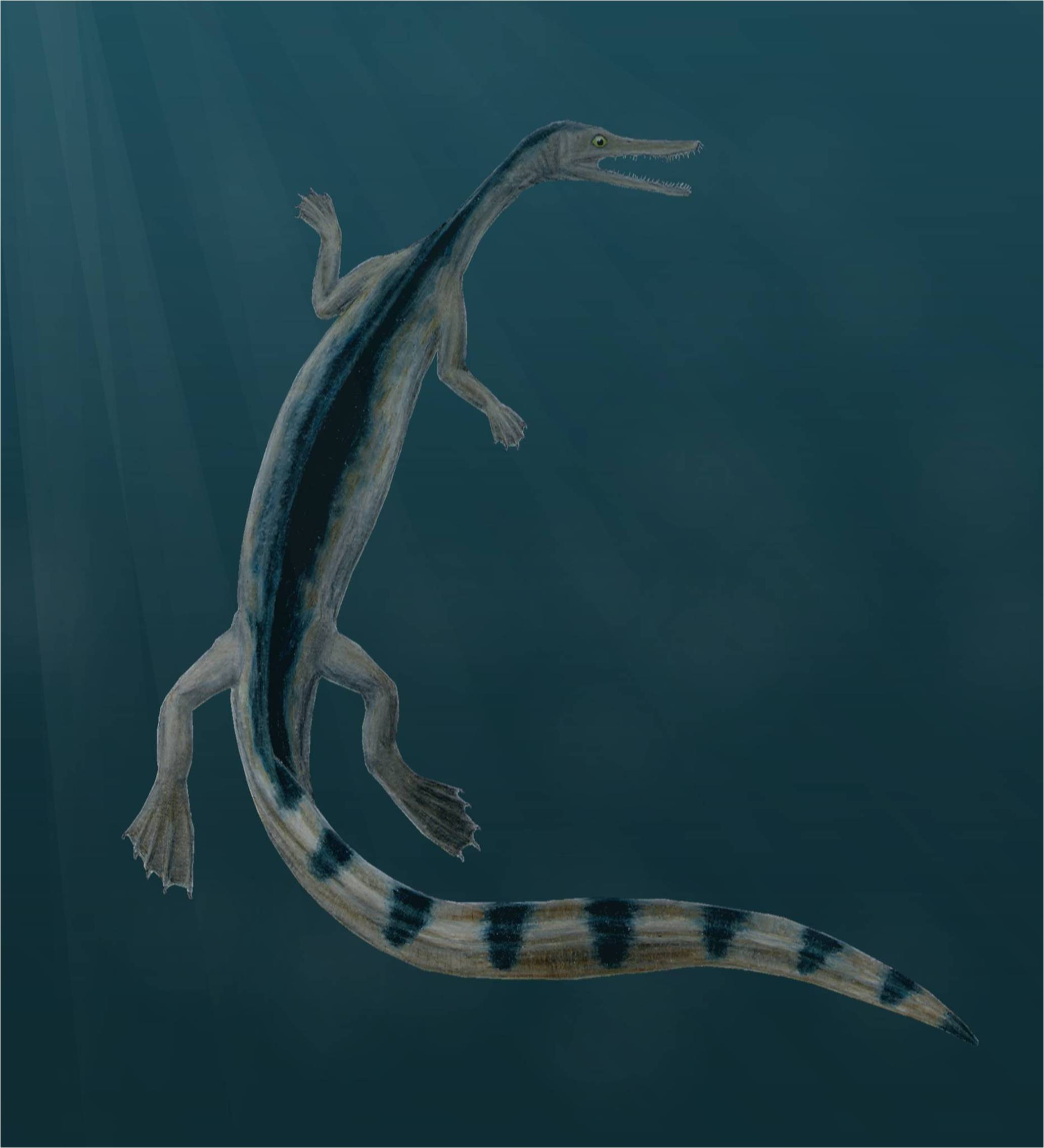
Interpretation of Stereosternum

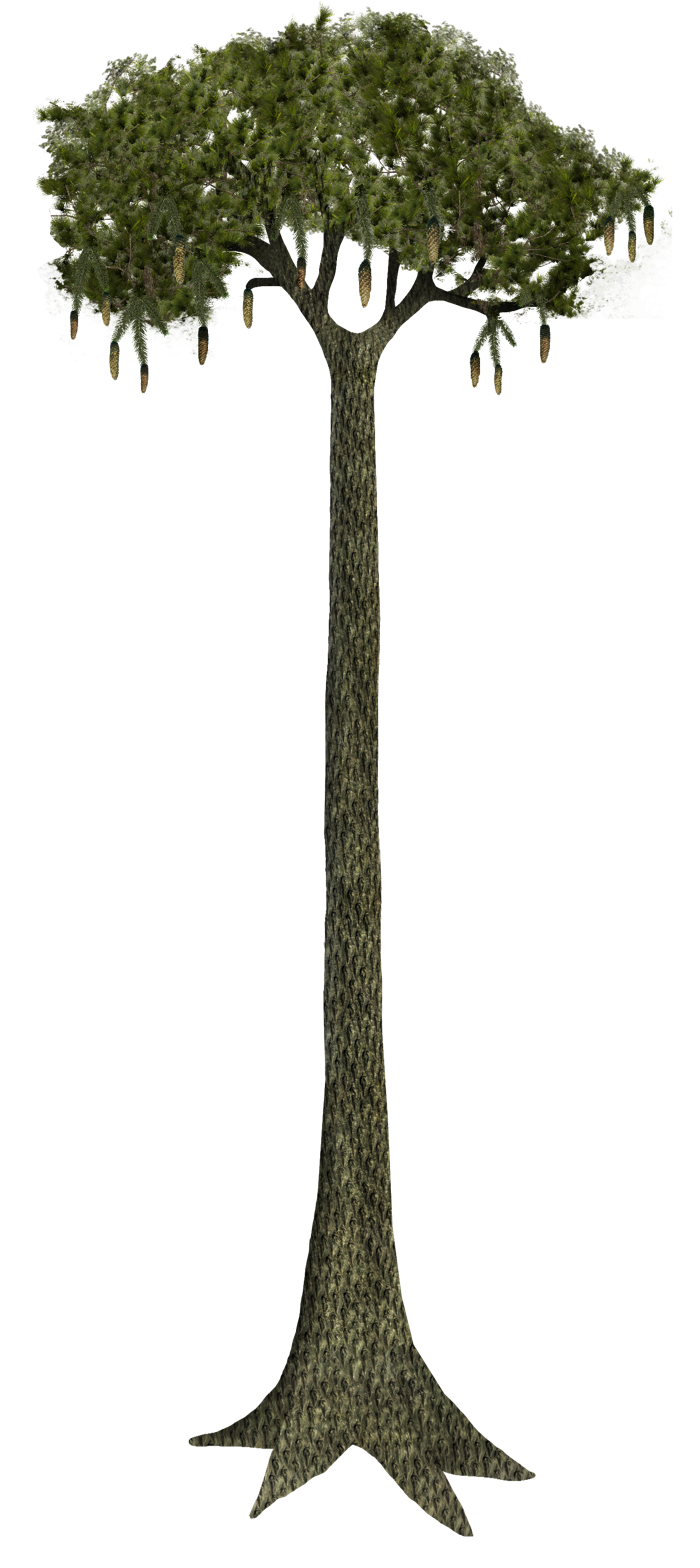
Interpretation of Lepidodendron

The Whitehill Formation has provided a variety of fossil insects, rare flora and Mesosaurus fossils, typical for the Permian of Gondwana. The mesosaurids are preserved as molds filled with gypsum crystals; they are commonly disarticulated. More rarely, casts of mesosaurids are found. Plant stems are similarly rare, and most commonly occur as chloritized fragments floating in the pink lower, more massive mudstone succession of the Whitehill Formation, while coprolites containing either palaeoniscoid scales or fragmentary crustacean carapaces are preserved on bedding planes.

The following fossils have been reported from the Whitehill Formation:

Reptiles

- Mesosaurus tenuidens
- Noteosaurus africanus
- Stereosternum tumidum

Fish

- Palaeoniscum capensis
- Watsonichthys lotzi

Insects

- Afrochoristella maclachlani
- Afrocupes firmae
- Sharovia permiafricana

Flora

- Lepidodendron whitehillianum

== Economic geology ==
The high concentration of organic matter in the black shales of the Whitehill Formation make it an interesting target for shale gas exploration. The formation is considered the prime focus for potential shale gas prospects in the Southern Karoo. TOC levels average at 4.5% TOC, and range from 0.5 to 14.7%, comparable to known shale gas producing formations as the Marcellus Formation and the Barnett Shale. The formation is considered to have economic potential in an area around Beaufort West to Graaff-Reinet.

Results from Rock-Eval pyrolysis, vitrinite reflectance measurements, open pyrolysis and thermovaporization analyses carried out on core samples drilled through the formation show that organic matter has reached an advanced stage of kerogen development. These rocks can therefore be classified as overmature, likely because of the thermotectonic processes related to the Cape orogeny forming the Cape Fold Belt overprint on lower Karoo rocks in the study area. It is possible that the maturity of the shales decreases farther north in the Karoo basin.

== See also ==
- List of fossiliferous stratigraphic units in Namibia
- List of fossiliferous stratigraphic units in South Africa
- Geology of Namibia
- Geology of South Africa
- Ganigobis Formation
- Gondwanide orogeny
