= Huab Formation =

Geologic formation in Africa

- Stratigraphic range: Artinskian-Kungurian typically Artinskian; ~285–275 Ma
- Type: Geological formation
- Unit of: "Ecca" Group
- Underlies: Gai-As Formation
- Overlies: Basement
- Area: From Atlantic coast to Twyfelfontein
- Thickness: 75–190 m (246–623 ft)

Lithology
- Primary: Shale, limestone
- Other: Sandstone, conglomerate, stromatolite, coal

Location
- Location: Damaraland
- Coordinates: 21.2°S 14.1°E
- Approximate paleocoordinates: 51.0°S 30.5°W
- Region: Kunene & Erongo Regions
- Country: Namibia
- Extent: Huab Basin

Type section
- Named for: Huab River
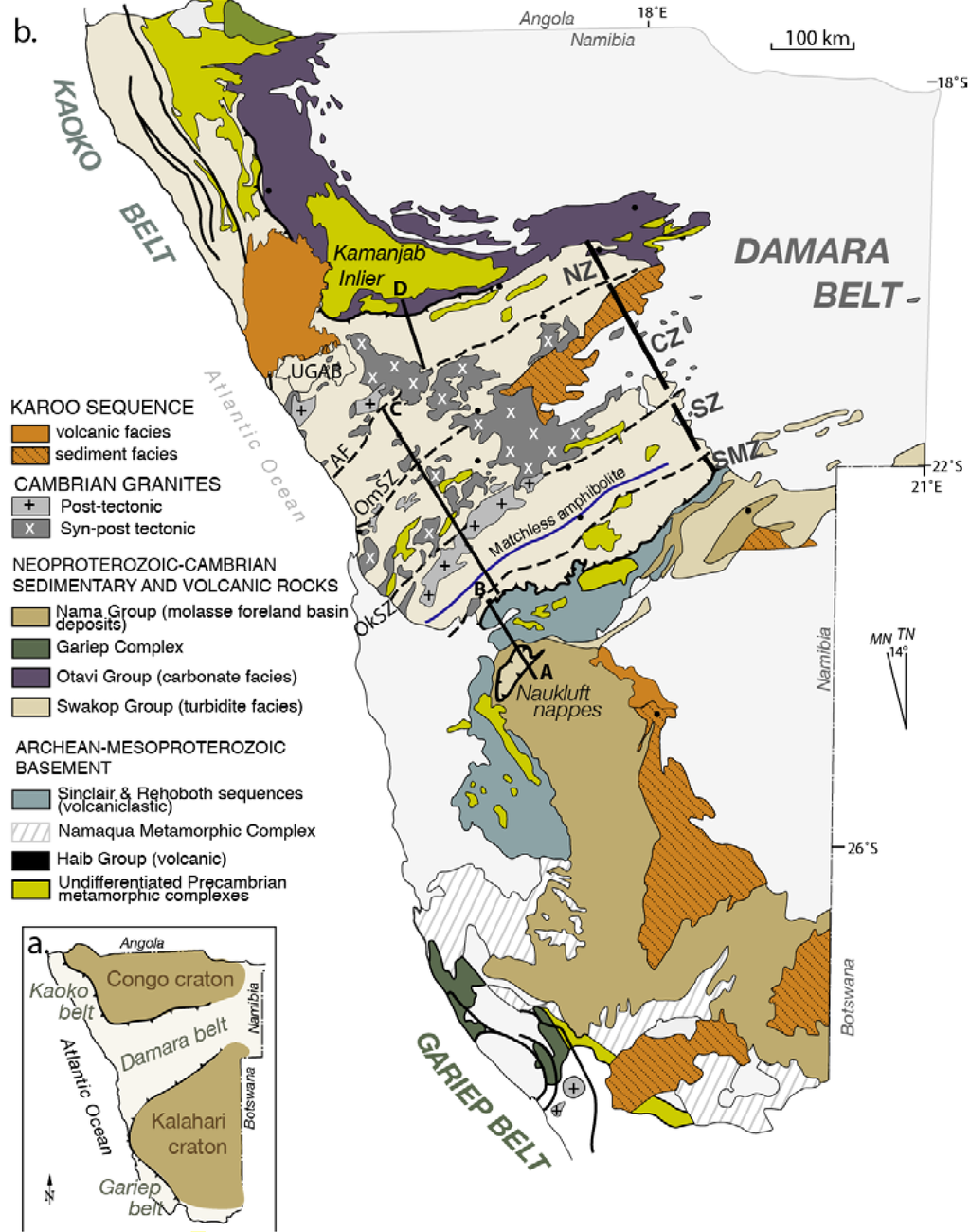
- Geologic map of Namibia with the Huab Formation partly cropping out in the northwestern area (orange)

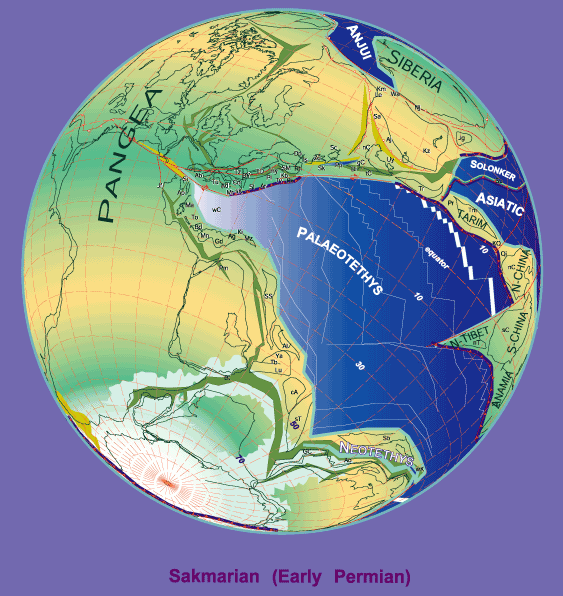
Early Permian paleogeography (280 Ma)

The Huab Formation is an Early Permian (Artinskian to Kungurian) geologic formation correlated with the Ecca Group and designated "Ecca" Group, because it does not belong to the Karoo, in the southwestern Kunene Region and northern Erongo Region of northwestern Namibia. The Huab Formation represents the oldest sedimentary unit of the Huab Basin, overlying the basement. The oil shales within the formation were deposited in a shallow lacustrine environment, and the formation marks the transition from terrestrial deposits under glacial climatic circumstances towards a warmer fluvial and marine deltaic environment.

The Huab Formation is correlated with a series of formations in the Pelotas and Paraná Basins in southeastern Brazil, deposited in a larger basinal area, 150 million years before the break-up of Pangea. The abundance of Glossopteris and Mesosaurus fossils are characteristic of the Gondwanan correlation across present-day South America, Africa, Antarctica and Australia.

== Description ==
The Huab Formation is a lithological unit with an approximate maximum thickness of 190 metres (620 ft), deposited in the eponymous basin where it underlies the Gai-As Formation, separated by a significant hiatus, and overlies the basement. The formation crops out south of the Huab River, extending from the Atlantic coast to Twyfelfontein. The thickness in the coastal area is about 75 metres (246 ft).

=== Lithologies ===
Part of the formation in the west is composed of carbonates (domal stromatolites with an east to west orientation and thin laminae of less than 1 millimetre (0.039 in)). The stromatolites occur in a 35 kilometres (22 mi) wide zone, reaching from 3 kilometres (1.9 mi) east of the Uniab Fault to 2 kilometres (1.2 mi) east of the Bergsig Fault system. The eastward sections comprise oolitic conglomeratic horizons of up to 50 centimetres (1.6 ft) thick. The carbonates (mudstones and marls) are overlain by silty, partly calcareous shales. The shales interfinger with sandstones and in certain parts coal beds are found. In the eastern domain around the Doros crater, dark iron-oxide cements occur in the upper conglomerate horizons. In virtually all lithological units, bones of the amphibious reptile Mesosaurus tenuidens can be encountered in concretions. The laminated mudstones and marls contain a diverse ichnofauna including Skolithos, Planolites, and large exemplars of Rhizocorallium irregulare.

=== Depositional environments ===
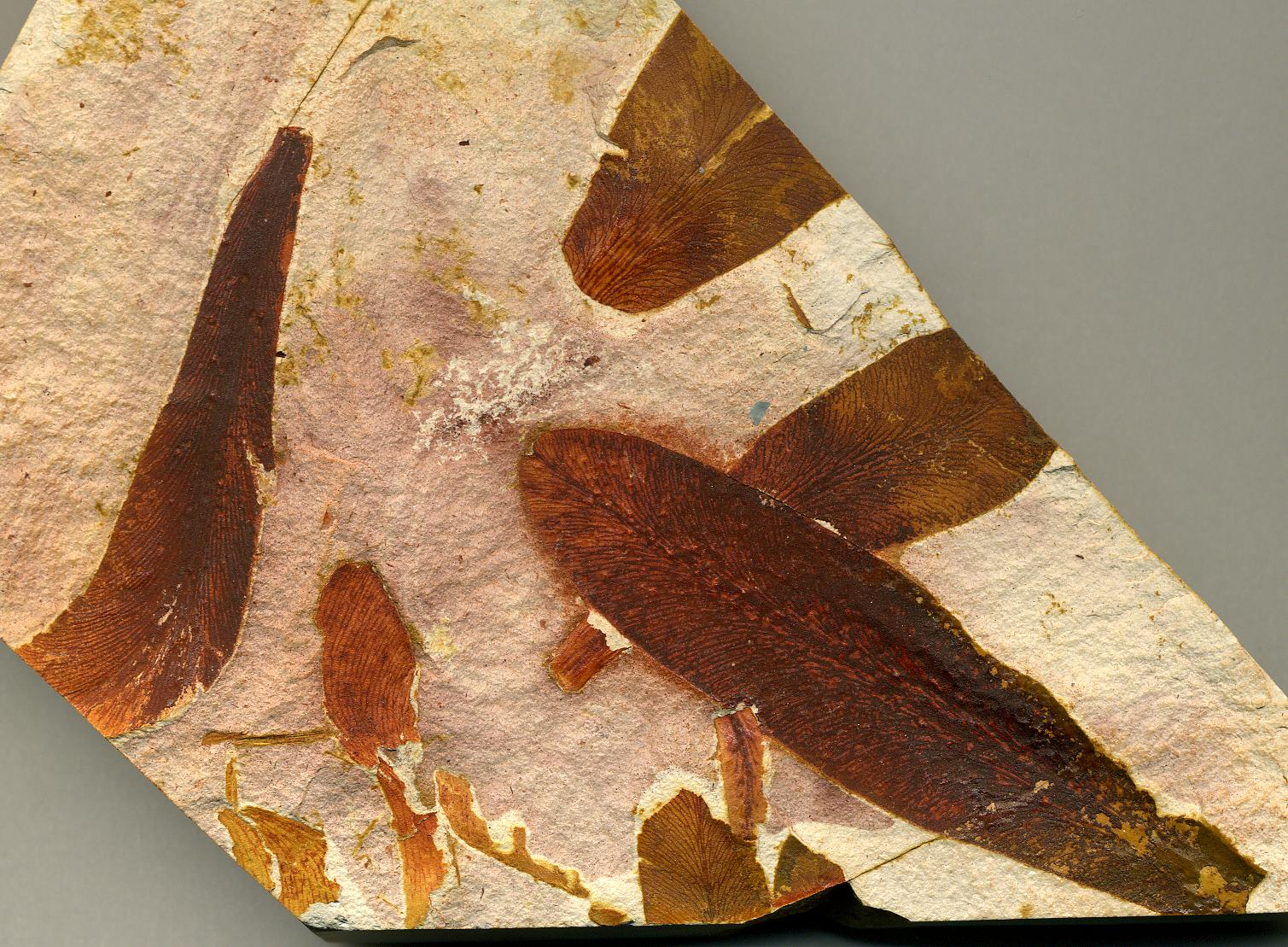
Glossopteris

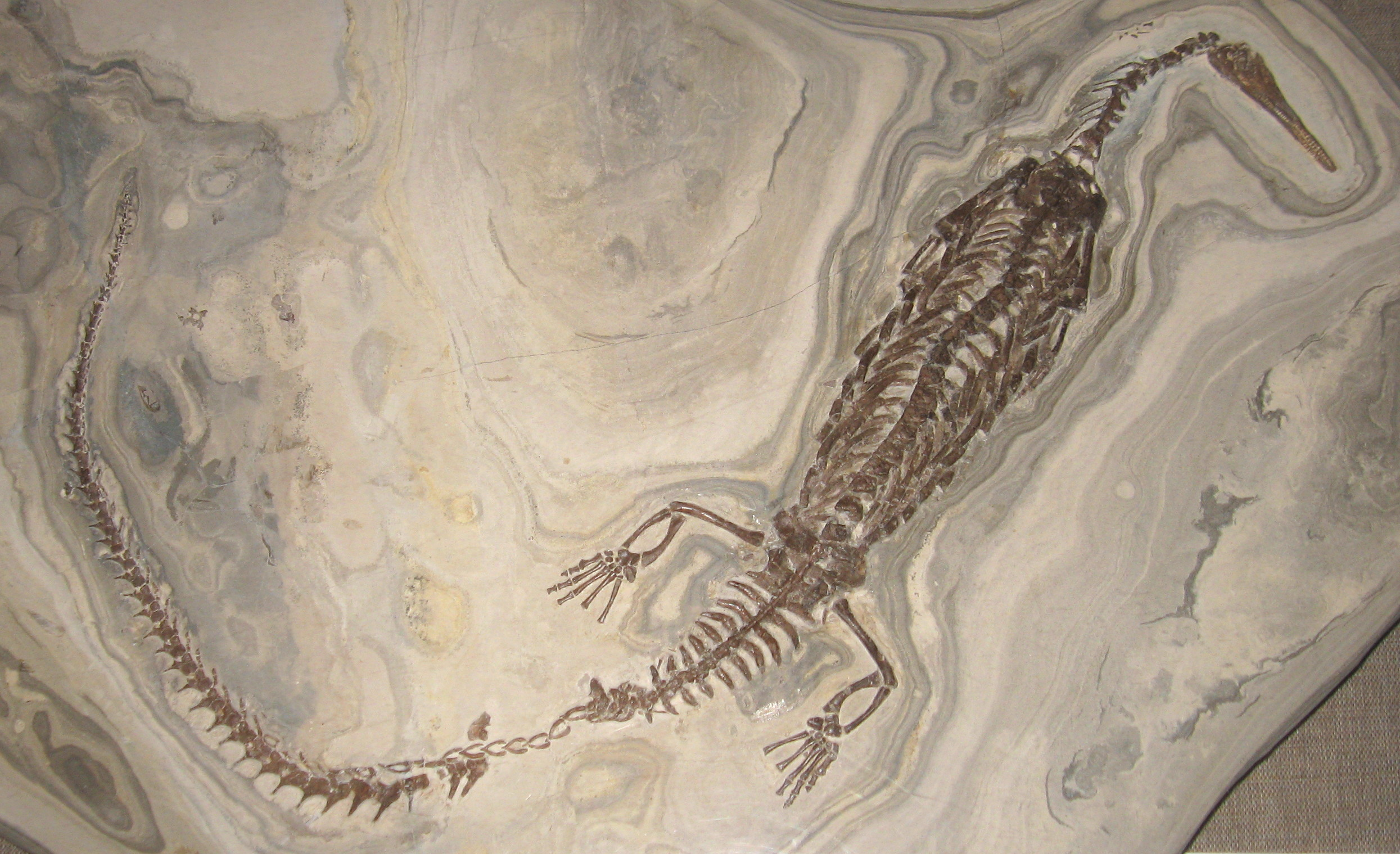
Mesosaurus

Glossopteris and Mesosaurus, characteristic flora and fauna for the Permian of Gondwana

The depositional environment is interpreted as ranging from glacial (tillite) at the very base, followed by a glacio-fluvial setting, and a warmer climate fluvial environment. The sequence higher up is formed by a fan deltaic setting, with a lateral shallow lake with increased salinity where stromatolite bioherms were formed. The uppermost section of the Huab Formation, underlying the Gai-As Formation, was deposited in an estuarine environment.

The depositional environments have been described in detail by Wanke in 2000 as follows:

Western and central domain

Stromatolitic bioherms acted as a barrier towards the open sea in the west. Their preferred E-W orientation coincides with tidal- and wave induced currents perpendicular to the palaeo-coastline. Lagoonal environments were established landwards of the bioherm belts, in which laminated shales developed. The lamination is due to suspension fallout in slightly agitated water. Erosive based interbeds of coarse to gritty sandstones formed during storm events and are therefore interpreted as tempestites. West of the bioherm belts, the fair weather wave basis reached the ground, expressed in oscillation-rippled surfaces.

Channels between bioherm ridges have been interpreted as tidal channels. They host flat-pebble conglomerates, which are characterized by a high ooid content. These ooid bearing flat-pebble conglomerates support the facies concept of shallow, wave dominated water in the vicinity of the bioherms: Ooids form in very shallow, fairly agitated, carbonate saturated water probably under warm climate. The flat pebbles derived from desiccated layers of unlithified cohesive fine clastics that had been reworked, preferentially under the influence of storm waves. Tidal flats or lagoons provide the conditions for the generation of both, ooids and flat-pebble conglomerates.

Eastern domain

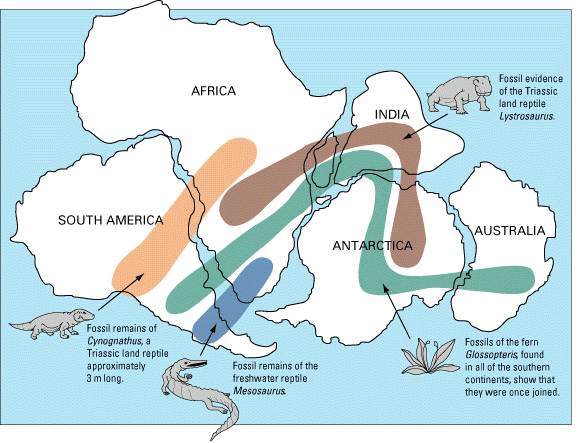
Correlation with former neighboring basins as the Paraná Basin in Brazil, characterized by the presence of Glossopteris (green) and Mesosaurus (blue)

Shales and mudstones besides algal laminites represent deposition in a slightly agitated, shallow water body with relatively intensive carbonate production. Oscillating water-levels resulted in the formation of paleosols, which were reworked in flat pebble conglomerates after flooding. Autochthonous breccias give clear evidence for frequent sea level fluctuations, that refer to palustrine soils, which underwent periodically subaerial exposure. Coarse sandstones, partly channelized, reveal fluvial influence. The coarser material was probably sourced by a nearby delta that was temporarily flooded during storm events. The dominance of those coarse sandstones towards the top of the eastern flat-pebble facies association might indicate delta progradation. The iron-oxide cements are interpreted as ferricretes, that either formed autochthonous or derived from adjacent reworked ferricrete crusts. An early uplift of the eastern hinterland might be indicated by coarse, westwardly prograding deltaic deposits of the upper Huab Formation in the eastern Huab area.

=== Correlations ===
The upper part of the formation is correlated with the Irati Formation of the Paraná and Pelotas Basins in Rio Grande do Sul, Brazil, and with the Whitehill Formation in the Karoo Basin of southern Namibia and the Eastern, Northern and Western Cape, South Africa. The lower section correlates with the Palermo and Rio Bonito Formations of the Paraná Basin and the Prince Albert Formation of the Karoo. The Permian sequence in the Huab Basin is much thinner than those of the Paraná and Karoo Basins. The fossil assemblages of Glossopteris and Mesosaurus are known from other parts of Gondwana; the Vryheid Formation of South Africa and coal deposits of the Lower Permian in Australia.

== See also ==
- List of fossiliferous stratigraphic units in Namibia
- Geology of Namibia
- Ganigobis Formation
- Gondwanide orogeny
