= List of fossiliferous stratigraphic units in South Africa =

Recognised geological strata of the region

Major fossiliferous stratigraphic units in South Africa
Pleistocene
Pliocene
Miocene
Late Cretaceous
Early Cretaceous
Jurassic
Triassic
Permian
Devonian
Ordovician

This is a list of fossiliferous stratigraphic units in South Africa.

Group	Formation	Period	Notes
	Third White Ash Formation	Late Pleistocene	
	Rietputs Formation	Calabrian	
Transvaal Group	Sterkfontein Formation	Pliocene-Pleistocene	
Transvaal Group	Swartkrans Formation	Pliocene-Pleistocene	
	Kromdraai Formation	Pliocene-Pleistocene	
	Makapansgat Formation	Pliocene	
	Elandsfontyn Formation	Miocene-Pliocene	
	Bredasdorp Formation	Miocene	
	Varswater Formation	Miocene	
Alphard Group		Coniacian-Maastrichtian	
	St Lucia Formation	Coniacian-Maastrichtian	
	Mzamba Formation	Coniacian-Campanian	
	Umzamba Formation	Coniacian-Campanian	
	Mzinene Formation	Albian-Cenomanian	
	Makatini Formation	Barremian-Albian	
	Brenton Formation	Valanginian	
	Mngazana Formation	Valanginian	
	Umgazana Formation	Valanginian	
Uitenhage Group	Sundays River Formation	Valanginian-Hauterivian	
Uitenhage Group	Kirkwood Formation	Berriasian-Hauterivian	
Uitenhage Group	Enon Formation	Late Jurassic-Early Cretaceous	
	Lisbon Formation	Early Jurassic	
Drakensberg Group	Drakensberg Formation	Early Jurassic	
Stormberg Group	Bushveld Sandstone	Hettangian-Sinemurian	
Stormberg Group	Clarens Formation	Early Jurassic	
Stormberg Group	Elliot Formation	Norian-Sinemurian	
Stormberg Group	Molteno Formation	Carnian	
	Bosbokpoort Formation	Late Triassic	
Beaufort Group; Adelaide Subgroup	Balfour Formation	Changhsingian	
Beaufort Group	Burgersdorp Formation	Triassic	
Beaufort Group	Katberg Formation	Triassic	
Beaufort Group	Normandien Formation	Induan	
Beaufort Group	Estcourt Formation	Permian	
Beaufort Group	Teekloof Formation	Permian	
Beaufort Group	Middleton Formation	Permian	
Beaufort Group	Koonap Formation	Permian	
Beaufort Group	Abrahamskraal Formation	Capitanian	
Ecca Group	Waterford Formation	Permian	
Ecca Group	Laingsburg Formation	Permian	
Ecca Group	Pietermaritzburg Formation	Permian	
Ecca Group	Whitehill Formation	Artinskian-Kungurian	
Ecca Group	Vryheid Formation	Permian	
Ecca Group	Volksrust Formation	Permian	
	Emakwezini Formation	Permian	
Dwyka Group	Ganigobis Formation	Gzhelian-Artinskian	
Witteberg Group	Weltevrede Formation	Frasnian	
Witteberg Group	Waaipoort Shale	Mid-Late Devonian	
Witteberg Group	Witpoort Formation	Mid-Late Devonian	
Witteberg Group	Kweekvlei Shale	Mid-Late Devonian	
Witteberg Group	Blinkberg Sandstone	Mid-Late Devonian	
Witteberg Group	Driekuilen Sandstone	Mid-Late Devonian	
Witteberg Group	Wagen Drift Formation	Givetian	
Bokkeveld Group	Waboomberg Formation	Middle Devonian	
Bokkeveld Group	Boplaas Formation	Devonian	
Bokkeveld Group	Tra-Tra Formation	Devonian	
Bokkeveld Group	Hexriver Formation	Devonian	
Bokkeveld Group	Voorstehoek Formation	Devonian	
Bokkeveld Group	Gamka Formation	Devonian	
Bokkeveld Group	Gydo Formation	Early Devonian	
	Natal Formation	Devonian	
Table Mountain Group	Cedarburg Formation	Hirnantian	
Table Mountain Group	Soom Shale	Hirnantian	

== See also ==
- Lists of fossiliferous stratigraphic units in Africa
  - List of fossiliferous stratigraphic units in Botswana
  - List of fossiliferous stratigraphic units in Lesotho
  - List of fossiliferous stratigraphic units in Madagascar
  - List of fossiliferous stratigraphic units in Mozambique
  - List of fossiliferous stratigraphic units in Namibia
  - List of fossiliferous stratigraphic units in Zimbabwe
- List of fossiliferous stratigraphic units in Antarctica
- Geology of South Africa
