= List of fossiliferous stratigraphic units in Botswana =

Fossiliferous stratigraphic units in Botswana
Middle Ecca Group

This is a list of fossiliferous stratigraphic units in Botswana.

Group	Period	Notes
Karoo Supergroup; Ecca Group; Middle Ecca Group	Artinskian	

== See also ==
- Lists of fossiliferous stratigraphic units in Africa
  - List of fossiliferous stratigraphic units in Namibia
  - List of fossiliferous stratigraphic units in South Africa
  - List of fossiliferous stratigraphic units in Zambia
  - List of fossiliferous stratigraphic units in Zimbabwe
- Geology of Botswana
