= List of fossiliferous stratigraphic units in Namibia =

Major fossiliferous stratigraphic units in Namibia
Elisabeth Bay Formation
Langental Formation
Etjo Sandstone
Omingonde Formation
Huab & Gai-As Formations
Whitehill Formation
Ganigobis Formation
Nama Group

Fossiliferous stratigraphic units in Namibia are not as numerous as in neighboring South Africa, but several formations have provided unique fossil assemblages, particularly the Ediacaran fauna of the Vendian to Cambrian Nama Group, fossil fish in the Carboniferous to Permian Ganigobis Formation and Eocene Langental Formation, typical Permian Gondwanan biota in the Huab, Gai-As and Whitehill Formations, Early Triassic therapsids in the Omingonde Formation, Early Jurassic dinosaur trackways in the Etjo Sandstone and Early Miocene mammals and reptiles in the Elisabeth Bay Formation.

== List of fossiliferous stratigraphic units ==
Group	Formation	Period	Notes
	Etosha Limestone	Early Pleistocene	
	Tsondab Sandstone	Mio-Pliocene	
	Andoni Formation	Langhian	
	Elisabeth Bay Formation	Aquitanian-Burdigalian	
	Buntfeldschuch Formation	Priabonian	
	Langental Formation	Bartonian-Priabonian	
	Eocliff Limestone	Bartonian	
	Black Crow Limestone	Ypresian-Lutetian	
Etendeka Group	Etjo Sandstone	Early Jurassic	
Karoo Supergroup	Omingonde Formation	Anisian-Ladinian	
"Ecca" Group	Gai-As Formation	Kungurian-Wordian	
"Ecca" Group	Huab Formation	Artinskian-Kungurian	
Ecca Group	Whitehill Formation	Artinskian-Kungurian	
Dwyka Group	Ganigobis Formation	Sakmarian	
Dwyka Group	Ganigobis Formation	Gzhelian	
Nama Group	Nomtsas Formation	Ediacaran-Cambrian	
Nama Group	Urusis Formation	Ediacaran-Cambrian	
Nama Group	Kuibis Quartzite	Ediacaran	
Nama Group	Naldaus/Nudaus Formation	Ediacaran	
Nama Group	Zaris Formation	Ediacaran	
Nama Group	Dabis Formation	Ediacaran	

== See also ==
- Lists of fossiliferous stratigraphic units in Africa
  - List of fossiliferous stratigraphic units in Angola
  - List of fossiliferous stratigraphic units in Botswana
  - List of fossiliferous stratigraphic units in South Africa
  - List of fossiliferous stratigraphic units in Zambia
- List of fossiliferous stratigraphic units in Uruguay
- List of fossiliferous stratigraphic units in Antarctica
- Geology of Namibia
