= Ganigobis Formation =

Geological formation in Southern Africa

- Stratigraphic range: Gzhelian-Artinskian; 302–297 Ma
- Type: Geological formation
- Unit of: Dwyka Group
- Sub-units: Ganigobis Shale Member
- Underlies: Ecca Group
- Overlies: Nama Group
- Thickness: up to 240 m (790 ft)

Lithology
- Primary: Shale, conglomerate, sandstone
- Other: Tuff

Location
- Coordinates: 25.9°S 18.0°E
- Approximate paleocoordinates: 56.0°S 35.9°W
- Region: ǁKaras Region; Northern Cape
- Country: Namibia, South Africa
- Extent: Aranos & Karoo Basins; Kalahari Craton

Type section
- Named for: Ganigobis
- Location: Ganigobis, Fish River Canyon
- Thickness at type section: 155 m (509 ft)
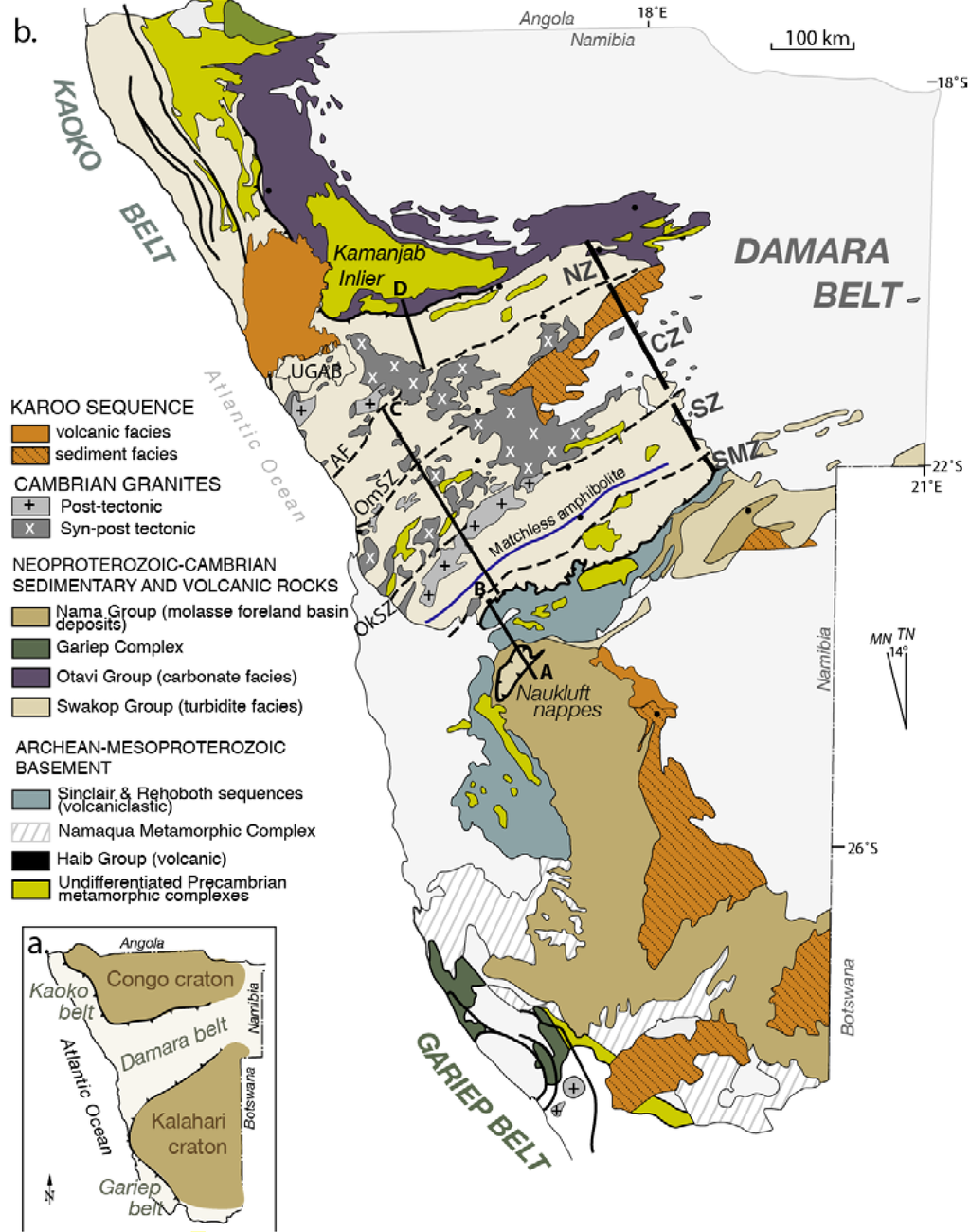
- Geologic map of Namibia with the Ganigobis Formation partly cropping out in the southern area (orange)

The Ganigobis Formation is a Late Carboniferous (Gzhelian) to Early Permian (Artinskian) geologic formation of the Dwyka Group in the ǁKaras Region of southeastern Namibia and the Northern Cape of South Africa. The widespread formation was deposited in the Aranos and Karoo Basins of southern Africa.

== Description ==
The Ganigobis Formation is an extensive unit with a maximum thickness of 240 metres (790 ft) evidenced in the Vreda borehole. The conglomerates, sandstones, shales and tuff of the formation were deposited in a glacio-lacustrine to marine environment. The Ganigobis Formation provides fossil fish as well as bivalves (e.g. Nuculopsis), gastropods (e.g. Peruvispira), scyphozoa (e.g. Conularia), crinoid stalks, foraminifera (Hyperammina, Ammodiscus, Glomospira, Ammobacculites and Spiroplectammina), sponges and sponge spicules, radiolaria, coprolites and permineralised wood.

Zircons of the Ganigobis Shale Member yield SHRIMP-ages of 302-300 Ma. This dates the uppermost part of the second deglaciation sequence in southern Namibia to the Late Carboniferous (Gzelian) and provides a minimum age for the onset of Karoo-equivalent marine deposition. The age of the uppermost argillaceous part of the third deglaciation sequence (297 Ma) was determined from zircons of a tuffaceous bed sampled in a roadcut in the Western Cape Province, South Africa.

== Fossil content ==
Among others, the following fish fossils are reported from the formation:

- Acrolepis addamsi
- Namaichthys schroederi
- Watsonichthys lotzi

== See also ==
- List of fossiliferous stratigraphic units in Namibia
- List of fossiliferous stratigraphic units in South Africa
- Geology of Namibia
- Geology of South Africa
- Irati Formation
