= Diamantochloris =

Diamantochloris Temporal range: Lutetian

Scientific classification
- Kingdom: Animalia
- Phylum: Chordata
- Class: Mammalia
- Order: Afrosoricida
- Family: Chrysochloridae
- Genus: †Diamantochloris
- Species: †D. inconcessus

Binomial name
- †Diamantochloris inconcessus Pickford, 2015

Diamantochloris is an extinct genus of chrysochlorid that lived during the Lutetian stage of the Eocene epoch.

== Distribution ==
Diamantochloris inconcessus is known from the Black Crow Limestone of Namibia.
