= Langental Formation =

Geologic formation in Namibia

- Stratigraphic range: Bartonian-Priabonian; ~41–34 Ma
- Type: Geological formation
- Underlies: Blaubok Conglomerate
- Overlies: Silica Beds

Lithology
- Primary: Sandstone, siltstone

Location
- Coordinates: 27.4°S 15.4°E
- Approximate paleocoordinates: 31.4°S 8.6°E
- Region: ǁKaras Region
- Country: Namibia
- Extent: Sperrgebiet
- Langental Formation (Namibia)

The Langental Formation, also spelled as Langetal Formation, is a Late Eocene (Bartonian to Priabonian) geologic formation cropping out in the Sperrgebiet, ǁKaras Region of southwestern Namibia. The siltstones and sandstones of the formation were deposited in a shallow marine environment. The Langental Formation was deposited under hot and humid conditions. The formation overlies the Silica Beds unit and is overlain by the Blaubok Conglomerate. The Langental Formation provides many fossil invertebrates and fish.

== Fossil content ==
Among others, the following fossils are reported from the formation:

Fish

- Alopecias smithwoodwardi
- Carcharias (Aprionodon) frequens
- Carcharias (Physodon) quartus
- Carcharodon hastalis
- Cestracion vincenti
- Chrysophrys blankenhorni
- Cylindracanthus cf. rectus
- Galeocerdo latidens
- Galeus porrectus, G. robustus
- Isurus desorii
- Labrodon stromeri
- Lamna barnitzkei, L. vincenti
- Myliobatis cf. dixoni
- Notidanus serratissimus
- Odontaspis contortidens, O. macrota, O. winkleri
- Odontorhytis pappenheimi
- Oxypristis ferinus
- Paranarrhichas damesi
- Pimelodus cf. gaudryi
- Rhinoptera rasilis
- Sphyraenodus hastatus
- Squatina prima

== See also ==
- List of fossiliferous stratigraphic units in Namibia
- Geology of Namibia
- Elisabeth Bay Formation
