= Israel C. White =

American geologist (1848–1927)

Israel Charles White
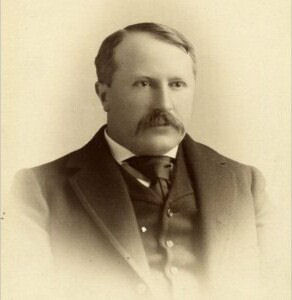
- I. C. White about 1898
- Born: November 1, 1848; Monongalia County Virginia, U.S.
- Died: November 24, 1927 (aged 79); Baltimore Maryland, U.S.
- Education: West Virginia University, Columbia School of Mines, University of Arkansas
- Known for: Geology of West Virginia
- Scientific career
- Fields: Geology

Israel Charles White (November 1, 1848 – November 24, 1927) was an internationally renowned geologist and professor. He was the first state geologist of West Virginia and made significant contributions to the field of geology.

== Biography ==
White was born on a farm in the Battelle district of Monongalia County, Virginia, United States, of western Monongalia County and grew up in Morgantown. White graduated from West Virginia University in June 1872 with a bachelor's degree in geology and did postgraduate studies in Geology and Chemistry from Columbia School of Mines and received a doctoral degree from the University of Arkansas in 1880. He began his career in 1875 as an assistant geologist in Pennsylvania. In 1877 he assumed the chair of Geology at West Virginia University, where he taught until 1892.

In 1878, he was elected as a member of the American Philosophical Society.

From 1884 to 1888, he worked as an assistant geologist for the United States Geological Survey, focusing on coal in Pennsylvania, Ohio, and West Virginia. He worked as a geologist at the West Virginia Geological and Economic Survey from 1897 onwards, eventually becoming chief of staff.

White field tested the "Anticlinal Theory" for oil and gas exploration in 1883. White then went on to discover the Pennsylvania and Washington gas and oil field, the Grapeville gas field, the Belle Vernon field, and then in 1889, the Mannington oil field. As White stated, "It taught the practical oil men once and for all that they could not afford to disregard geological truths in their search for oil deposits.

In 1904 he was hired by the Brazilian government as head of the "Comissão de Estudos das Minas de Carvão de Pedra do Brasil" (Commission for Studies on Brazilian Coal Mines), whose aim was to identify the potential of Brazilian coal, and whose report, published in 1908, was a milestone for understanding the geology of the Paraná Basin in Southern Brazil. One of the main results of these studies, besides the reconnaissance for coal, was the discovery of Mesosaurus fossils within Permian black shales (Irati Formation), and the Glossopteris flora within the Permian coals. White was one of the first to propose the equivalence between the South American Permian strata and similar rocks of the Karoo Basin in South Africa. This report had an important contribution to the development of Continental Drift Theory, published by Alfred Wegener in 1912.

He was the treasurer of the Geological Society of America in 1892–1907 and its president in 1920. He died in Baltimore, Maryland, aged 79.
