= List of fossiliferous stratigraphic units in Lesotho =

Fossiliferous stratigraphic units in Lesotho
Drakensberg Formation
Clarens Formation
Elliot Formation
Molteno Formation

This is a list of fossiliferous stratigraphic units in Lesotho.

Group	Formation	Period	Notes
Drakensberg Group	Drakensberg Formation	Pliensbachian	
Stormberg Group	Clarens Formation	Sinemurian	
Stormberg Group	Elliot Formation	Carnian-Sinemurian	
Stormberg Group	Molteno Formation	Carnian-Norian	

== See also ==
- Lists of fossiliferous stratigraphic units in Africa
  - List of fossiliferous stratigraphic units in South Africa
- Geology of Lesotho
