= Paludal =

Term used in geology and ecology to refer to marshland

Paludal is derived from the Latin word palus ("marsh").

- Paludal, in geology, refers to sediments that accumulated in a marsh environment.
- Paludal, in ecology, refers to the environment of a marsh.
