= Watsonichthys =

Watsonichthys Temporal range: Tournaisian – Asselian?

Scientific classification
- Domain: Eukaryota
- Kingdom: Animalia
- Phylum: Chordata
- Class: Actinopterygii
- Order: †Palaeonisciformes
- Genus: †Watsonichthys; Aldinger, 1937

Type species
- †Elonichthys pectinatus Traquair, 1877

Species
- †W. lotzi Gürich, 1923; †W. pectinatus (Traquair, 1877); †W. sphaerosideritarum Fritsch, 1895

Extinct genus of ray-finned fishes

Watsonichthys is an extinct genus of ray-finned fish that lived during the Tournaisian age (Mississippian, Carboniferous) to possibly the Asselian age (Cisuralian/lower Permian) in what is now Europe (Scotland, Germany, Czech Republic) and possibly Namibia. It is named after David Meredith Seares Watson.
