= Elisabeth Bay Formation =

Geological formation in Sperrgebiet, Namibia

- Stratigraphic range: Aquitanian-Burdigalian; ~21 Ma
- Type: Geological formation
- Overlies: Blaubok Conglomerate

Lithology
- Primary: Siltstone
- Other: Sandstone, claystone, conglomerate

Location
- Coordinates: 27.0°S 15.3°E
- Approximate paleocoordinates: 27.9°S 12.8°E
- Region: ǁKaras Region
- Country: Namibia
- Extent: Sperrgebiet

Type section
- Named for: Elizabeth Bay
- Elisabeth Bay Formation (Namibia)

The Elisabeth Bay Formation, alternatively spelled as Elizabeth Bay Formation, is an Early Miocene (Aquitanian to Burdigalian, around 21 Ma) geologic formation in the Sperrgebiet, ǁKaras Region of southwestern Namibia, overlying the Blaubok Conglomerate. The freshwater green and red siltstones, sandstones, intercalations of conglomerates and claystones of the formation were deposited in a fluvial environment, infilling a paleovalley incised during the Oligocene low sea stand, which backfilled during the Burdigalian marine transgression. The Elisabeth Bay Formation provides many fossil mammals, snakes and other reptiles.

== Fossil content ==
The following fossils are reported from the formation:

Mammals

- Afrosmilus africanus
- Apodecter stromeri
- Bathyergoides neotertiarius
- Diamantomys luederitzi
- Leptoplesictis senutae
- Metapterodon kaiseri
- Miohyrax oswaldi
- Namasector soriae
- Parapedetes namaquensis
- Promicrogale namibiensis
- Isohyaenodon sp.
- Ysengrinia sp.
- Viverridae indet.

Reptiles

- cf. Python
- Amphisbaenia indet.
- Boidae indet.
- Colubridae indet.
- Colubroidea indet.
- Gekkonidae indet.
- Lacertilia indet.
- Viperidae indet.

== See also ==
- List of fossiliferous stratigraphic units in Namibia
- Geology of Namibia
- Penguin Islands
