= Irati Formation =

Geologic formation in Brazil

- Stratigraphic range: Early Permian; ~278.4–270 Ma
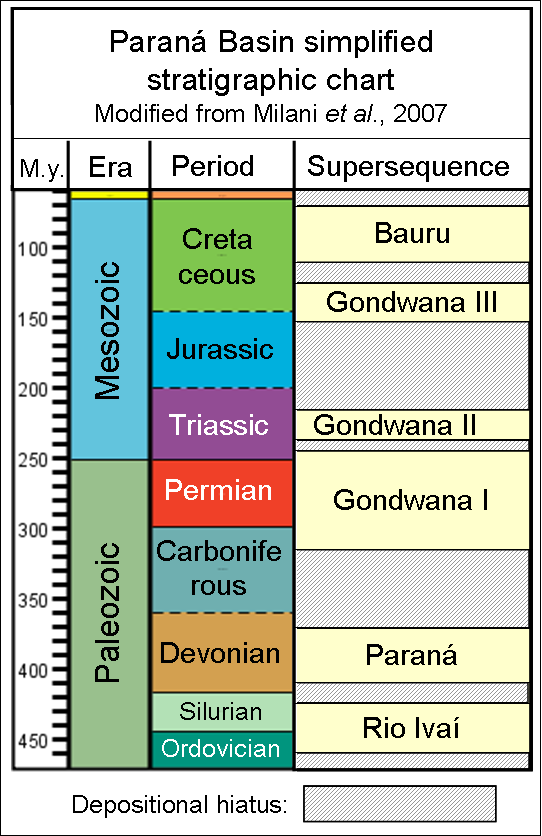
- The Irati Formation belongs to the Gondwana I megasequence
- Type: Geological formation
- Unit of: Passa Dois Group
- Underlies: Serra Alta Formation (Paraná Basin); Teresina Formation (Pelotas Basin)
- Overlies: Palermo Formation
- Area: 1,000,000 km^{2} (390,000 sq mi)
- Thickness: up to 80 m (260 ft)

Lithology
- Primary: Black shale
- Other: Sandstone

Location
- Coordinates: 25.5°S 50.7°W
- Region: Paraná & Pelotas Basins; Goiás, Mato Grosso do Sul, Mato Grosso, São Paulo, Paraná, Santa Catarina, Rio Grande do Sul
- Country: Brazil

Type section
- Named by: White
- Year defined: 1908
- Approximate paleocoordinates: 45.8°S 29.7°W
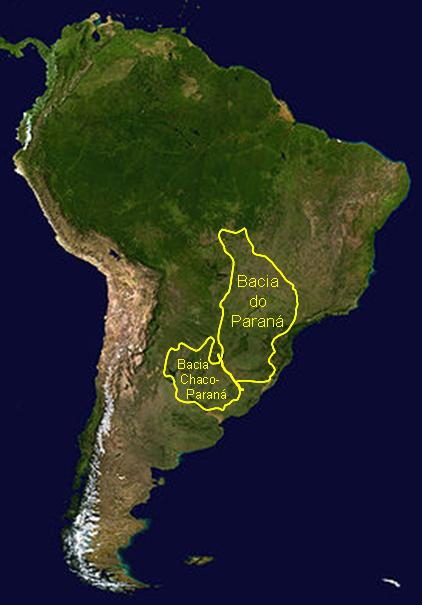
- The Paraná Basin in South America

Irati Formation is the name of a geological formation of the Paraná Basin in Brazil. It has previously been dated as Late Permian using palynomorphs, but is now dated as Early Permian using zircon ages obtained from bentonite layers. The base of the formation has been dated at 278.4 ± 2.2 Ma. Exposures of the Irati Formation are to be found in the South (Geopark of Paleorrota), southeastern Brazil and in the states of Goiás, Mato Grosso, São Paulo, Paraná, Santa Catarina, Rio Grande do Sul and Mato Grosso do Sul. The formation is part of the Passa Dios Group, underlying the Serra Alta Formation and overlying the Palermo Formation. The formation has been deposited in a restricted marine environment. The Irati Formation, with a maximum thickness of 80 metres (260 ft), was defined and named by White in 1908.

== Fossil content ==
Color key
Taxon	Reclassified taxon	Taxon falsely reported as present	Dubious taxon or junior synonym	Ichnotaxon	Ootaxon	Morphotaxon

Notes
Uncertain or tentative taxa are in small text; ~~crossed out~~ taxa are discredited.

=== Reptiles ===
Reptiles of the Irati Formation
Genus	Species	Location	Stratigraphic position	Material	Notes	Image
Brazilosaurus	B. sanpauloensis				A mesosaurid mesosaur	
Mesosaurus	M. tenuidiens				A mesosaurid mesosaur	
Stereosternum	S. tumidum				A mesosaurid mesosaur	

=== Fish ===
Fish of the Irati Formation
Genus	Species	Location	Stratigraphic position	Material	Notes	Images
Amelacanthus	A. sp.				A ctenacanthid shark	
Fairchildodus	F. rioclarensis				A petalodont	
Iratiacanthus	I. santamariaensis				A sphenacanthid shark	
Itapyrodus	I. punctatus				A petalodont	
Orodus	O. ipeunaensis				A orodontid shark	
Sphenacanthus	S. sanpauloensis				A sphenacanthid shark	
Taquaralodus	T. albuquequei				A diplodoselachid shark	
Xenacanthus	X. pricei				A xenacanthid shark	

=== Crustaceans ===
Crustaceans of the Irati Formation
Genus	Species	Location	Stratigraphic position	Material	Notes	Images
Iraticaris	I. damiani					
Myelontordoxylon	M. camposii					
Permocaris	P. purperae					
Pittinucaris	P. wuerdigae					

== See also ==
- Geology of Brazil
- Paleontological sites of Brazil
- Ganigobis Formation
