= Pelotas Basin =

Sedimentary basin in the South Atlantic Ocean

- Bacia de Pelotas, Cuenca de Pelotas
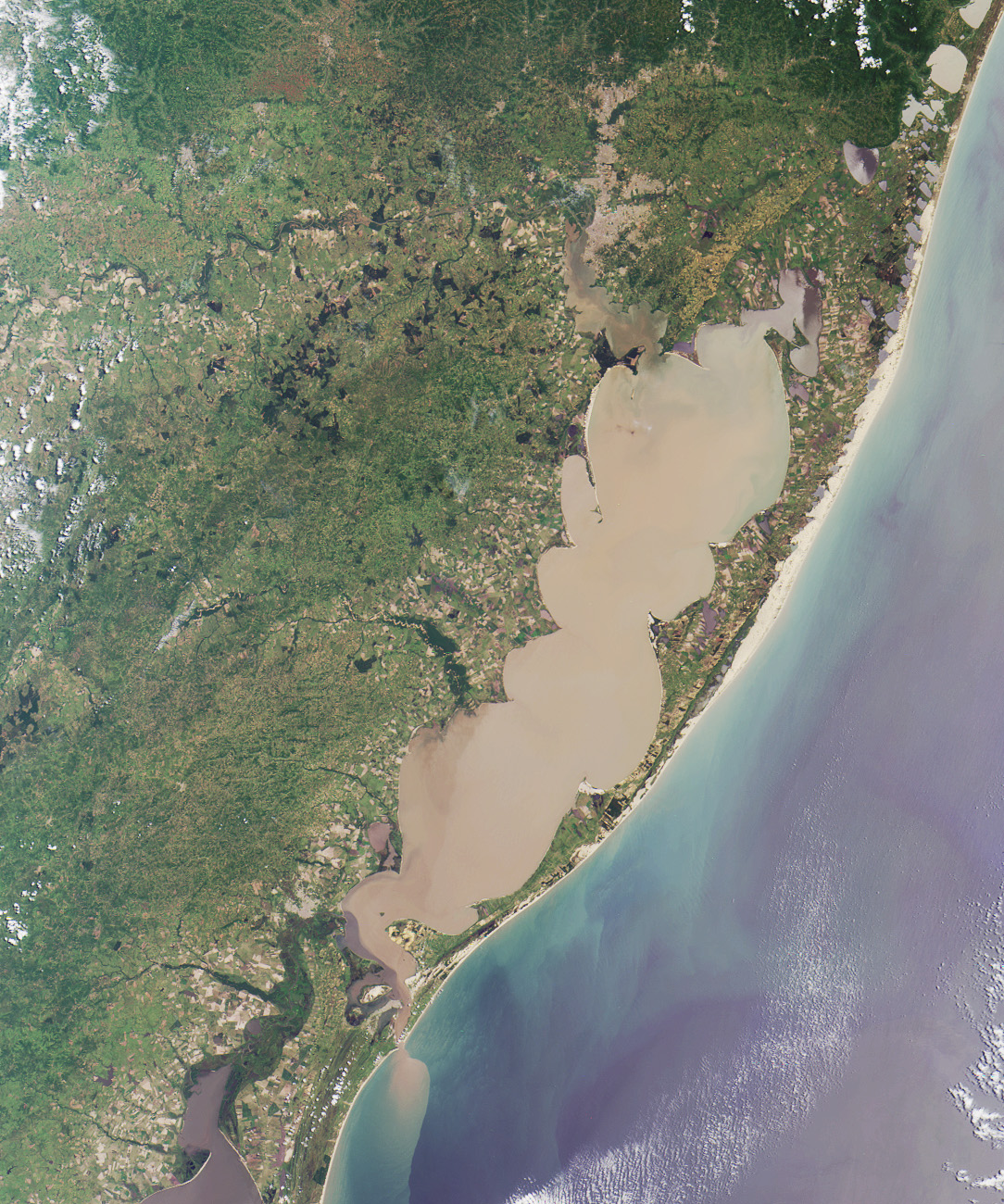
- The Lagoa dos Patos covers a large section of the onshore part of the basin

- Location of the basin in Brazil
- Coordinates: 32°06′40″S 48°55′50″W
- Etymology: Pelotas (a city in the state of Rio Grande do Sul)
- Region: South Atlantic
- Country: Brazil; Uruguay
- States: Santa Catarina, Rio Grande do Sul; Cerro Largo, Rocha, Treinta y Tres
- Cities: Porto Alegre, Rio Grande

Characteristics
- On/Offshore: Both, mostly offshore
- Boundaries: Serras de Sudeste, Florianópolis High, Polônio High, Cuchilla Grande
- Part of: Brazilian South Atlantic basins
- Area: ~346,000 km^{2} (134,000 sq mi)

Hydrology
- Sea: South Atlantic Ocean
- Rivers: Urussanga, Araranguá, Mampituba, Jacuí, Guaíba, Camaquã, Jaguarão/Yaguarón, Cebollatí Rivers
- Lakes: Lagoa dos Patos, Lagoon Mirim

Geology
- Basin type: Passive margin on rift basin
- Plate: South American
- Orogeny: Break-up of Gondwana
- Age: Hauterivian-recent
- Stratigraphy: Stratigraphy
- Field: none (2017)

The Pelotas Basin (Portuguese: Bacia de Pelotas, Spanish: Cuenca de Pelotas) is a mostly offshore sedimentary basin of approximately 346,000 square kilometres (134,000 sq mi) in the South Atlantic, administratively part of the southern states Santa Catarina and Rio Grande do Sul of Brazil and the departments Cerro Largo, Rocha and Treinta y Tres of Uruguay.

The Pelotas Basin is one of the basins that formed on the present-day South Atlantic margins of South America and Africa due to the break-up of Gondwana in the Early Cretaceous. The sedimentary succession started as the other Brazilian marginal basins with a series of basalts, younger than the Paraná and Etendeka traps exposed in the Paraná Basin to the west, followed by shallow to deeper marine carbonate and clastic sediments. Other than the northern neighbours Santos and Campos Basins, the Pelotas Basin lacks a thick layer of salt and the pre-salt layer pinches out just in the north of the Pelotas Basin stratigraphy.

Within the Brazilian Atlantic margin, the Pelotas Basin is relatively underexplored. Twenty exploration wells have been drilled in the Brazilian portion of the basin with one ultra-deepwater exploration well drilled on the Uruguayan side in 2016. No hydrocarbon accumulations have been proven in the basin thus far.

== Etymology ==
The basin is named after the city of Pelotas, the hometown of Rodi Ávila Medeiros, the geologist who studied the area.

== Description ==
The Pelotas Basin is an approximately 346,000-square-kilometre-large (134,000 mi^{2}), mostly offshore sedimentary basin, located in the South Atlantic offshore Brazil and Uruguay. It covers the southern Brazilian states of Santa Catarina and Rio Grande do Sul and the Uruguayan departments Cerro Largo, Rocha and Treinta y Tres. About 40,900 square kilometres (15,800 sq mi) of the basin is onshore. The onshore part of the basin in Uruguay is locally called Merín Basin.

The basin is bound by the Florianópolis High, separating it from the Santos Basin in the north and the Polônio High in the south, forming the border with the Punta del Este Basin. The coastal ranges Serras de Sudeste in Brazil and Cuchilla Grande in Uruguay form the western boundary, underlain by the Sierra Ballena Shear Zone. The onshore part of the basin is from north to south crossed by the Urussanga, Araranguá, Mampituba, Jacuí, Guaíba, Camaquã, Jaguarão/Yaguarón and Cebollatí Rivers.

=== Tectonic history ===
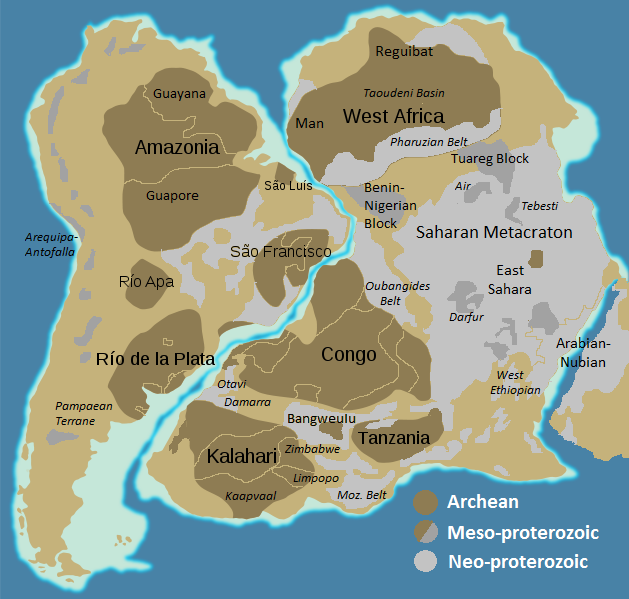
The Pelotas Basin formed with the rifting of Brazil and Africa splitting the Río de la Plata Craton from the Kalahari Craton.

The break-up of Pangaea characterised the start of formation of the Pelotas Basin in the South Atlantic, forming at the same time the Namibia Basin in Africa.

The basins of the South Atlantic margin started forming in the Early Cretaceous with the break-up of Gondwana, the southern part of the former supercontinent Pangea. This tectonic movement resulted in a sequence of rift basins bordering the present-day South Atlantic on the Brazilian and southwestern African sides. The Pelotas-Namibia spreading commenced in the Hauterivian, around 133 million years ago, and reached the Santos Basin to the north in the Barremian. Seafloor spreading continued northwards to the Campos Basin in the Early Albian, at approximately 112 Ma.

Five tectonic stages have been identified in the Brazilian basins:

1. Pre-rift stage – Jurassic to Valanginian
2. Syn-rift stage – Hauterivian to Late Barremian
3. Sag stage – Late Barremian to Late Aptian
4. Post-rift stage – Early to Middle Albian
5. Drift stage – Late Albian to Holocene

While the basins to the north of Pelotas Basin, the Santos, Campos and Espírito Santo Basins, are characterised by a thick sequence of salt and an accompanying pre-salt layer, evaporites are almost absent in the Pelotas Basin.

=== Stratigraphy ===
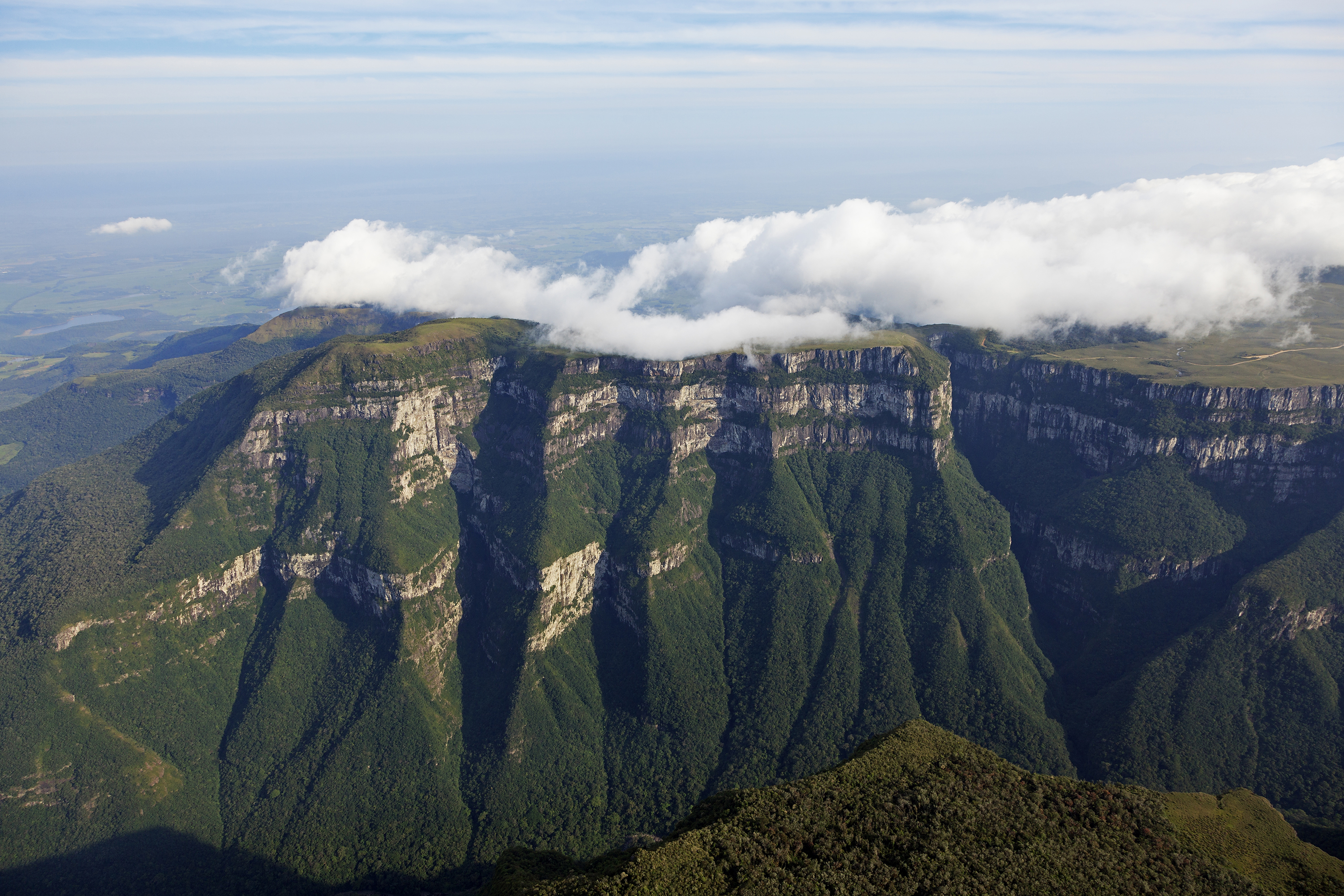
The basalts of the Serra Geral Formation are exposed in the Fortaleza Canyon of Serra Geral National Park.

The sedimentary succession of the Pelotas Basin is underlain by an extremely deformed (highly stretched, thinned and faulted) continental crust, covered by grabens that can achieve thicknesses of more than 20 kilometres (66,000 ft). The nature of the lower crust below the Pelotas Basin remains uncertain, but by analogy with the Namibian conjugate margin, it may correspond to a high-density igneous crust-mantle interface intruded by the Tristan da Cunha plume. The central onshore boundary of the basin is formed by the Neoproterozoic Pelotas Batholith. The stratigraphy of the Pelotas Basin and the Punta del Este Basin to the south had a different history due to the Polônio paleohigh until the Late Maastrichtian.

The basinal sequence starts with the Imbituba Formation, a unit consisting of basaltic volcanic rocks. Parts of these rocks have been dated at ages between 125 ± 0.7 Ma and 118 ± 1.9 Ma, more recent than the flood basaltic Serra Geral Formation of the Paraná and Etendeka traps to the west in the Paraná Basin. The basalts are exposed in the Serra Geral National Park as a 700-metre-high (2,300 ft) cliff. The volcanic deposits form seaward dipping reflectors (SDR) in the seismic surveys of the basin. The conglomerates, siltstones and diamictites of the Cassino Formation represent the top of the Gondwana break-up unconformity, dates to the Middle Aptian. The depositional environment has been interpreted as fluvio-deltaic to lacustrine. The formation is followed by the volcanics of the Curumim Formation, dated at 113 ± 0.1 Ma, and small incursions in the northern area of Pelotas Basin of the Ariri Formation, the evaporites that form the salt layer in the Santos Basin to the north.

The rapid subsidence from the Albian to Turonian created a wide marine platform with in the north elevated areas due to the doming of the Curumim Formation. On this platform, the marine limestones and siliciclastics of the Porto Belo Formation were deposited. Shales comprise the outer marine deposition of this stratigraphic unit, considered as a potential source rock. Overlying the Porto Belo Formation are the proximal Tramandaí and the distal Atlántida Formations, composed of coarse-grained fluvial to alluvial clastics, intercalated with siltstones and shales. This phase is characteristic of a large-scale prolonged transgression that lasted until the Oligocene. As in other areas of the Brazilian continental margin, the Late Turonian is marked by a regional unconformity.

The Late Cretaceous to recent sequence is subdivided into the proximal Cidreira Formation, related to the fluvial progradation of the Rio Grande, and a distal part known as the Imbé Formation, consisting of shales, intercalated with sporadic siltstones and fine-grained sandstones. The transgressive series is interrupted by the presence of various Paleogene hiatuses, that appear also in the regressive Miocene to recent beds. The unconformities have been analysed in detail using ^{87}Sr/^{86}Sr ratios.

Age	Formation		Lithologies		Maximum thickness	Notes
Pleistocene	Cidreira Fm.	Imbé Fm.	Sandstones, shales	Shales, siltstones, sandstones	7,000 m (23,000 ft)	
Pliocene	Cidreira Fm.	Imbé Fm.	Sandstones, shales	Shales, siltstones, sandstones	7,000 m (23,000 ft)	
Messinian	Cidreira Fm.	Imbé Fm.	Sandstones, shales	Shales, siltstones, sandstones	7,000 m (23,000 ft)	
Tortonian	Cidreira Fm.	Imbé Fm.			7,000 m (23,000 ft)	
Serravallian	Cidreira Fm.	Imbé Fm.			7,000 m (23,000 ft)	
Langhian	Cidreira Fm.	Imbé Fm.			7,000 m (23,000 ft)	
Chattian	Cidreira Fm.	Imbé Fm.			7,000 m (23,000 ft)	
Rupelian	Cidreira Fm.	Imbé Fm.			7,000 m (23,000 ft)	
Bartonian	Cidreira Fm.	Imbé Fm.			7,000 m (23,000 ft)	
Priabonian	Cidreira Fm.	Imbé Fm.			7,000 m (23,000 ft)	
Lutetian	Cidreira Fm.	Imbé Fm.			7,000 m (23,000 ft)	
Ypresian	Cidreira Fm.	Imbé Fm.			7,000 m (23,000 ft)	
Paleocene	Cidreira Fm.	Imbé Fm.			7,000 m (23,000 ft)	
Maastrichtian	Cidreira Fm.	Imbé Fm.			7,000 m (23,000 ft)	
Campanian	Cidreira Fm.	Imbé Fm.			7,000 m (23,000 ft)	
Santonian	Cidreira Fm.	Imbé Fm.			7,000 m (23,000 ft)	
Coniacian	Cidreira Fm.	Imbé Fm.			7,000 m (23,000 ft)	
Late Turonian	Cidreira Fm.	Imbé Fm.			7,000 m (23,000 ft)	
Early Turonian	Tramandaí Fm.	Atlántida Fm.	Sandstones, siltstones, shales	Shales	900 m (3,000 ft)	
Cenomanian	Tramandaí Fm.	Atlántida Fm.	Sandstones, siltstones, shales	Shales	900 m (3,000 ft)	
Late Albian	Tramandaí Fm.	Atlántida Fm.	Sandstones, siltstones, shales	Shales	900 m (3,000 ft)	
Early Albian	Tramandaí Fm.	Porto Belo Fm.	Sandstones, siltstones, shales	Limestones, shales	700 m (2,300 ft)	
Early Albian	Ariri Fm.		Thin evaporites		800 m (2,600 ft)	
Aptian	Curumim Fm.		Basalts		800 m (2,600 ft)	
Aptian	Cassino Fm.		Conglomerates, siltstones		1,800 m (5,900 ft)	
Aptian	Imbituba Fm.		Basalts			
Barremian	Imbituba Fm.		Basalts			
Barremian	Serra Geral Fm.		Flood basalts			
Hauterivian	Serra Geral Fm.		Flood basalts			
Valanginian	Serra Geral Fm.		Flood basalts			
Valanginian	Botucatu Fm.		Quartzitic sandstones			
Berriasian	Botucatu Fm.		Quartzitic sandstones			
Tithonian	Botucatu Fm.		Quartzitic sandstones			
Early-Late Jurassic						
Late Triassic
Permo-Triassic	Rio do Rasto Fm.		Red sandstones			
Permo-Triassic	Teresina Fm.		Fine sandstones and carbonates			
Permo-Triassic	Irati Fm.		Black shales and carbonates			
Permo-Triassic	Palermo Fm.		Siltstones, fine sandstones			
Permo-Triassic	Rio Bonito Fm.		Sandstones, siltstones, shales			
Early-Late Paleozoic						
Precambrian	Pelotas Batholith, Dom Feliciano Belt		Granite, gabbro, diorite, rhyolitic to basaltic dikes			

== Exploration ==
The Pelotas Basin is relatively underexplored. The Brazilian part of the basin had a total of twenty exploration wells drilled until 2017. The first eight wells were drilled in the onshore section in the 1950s and 1960s. After acquiring seismic survey in the 1970s, seven more wells were drilled in the shallow offshore part. Five other offshore wells were drilled between 1995 and 2001. The first and hitherto only well drilled in the Uruguayan part of the basin was drilled in 2016. Hydrocarbon accumulations have yet to be discovered in Pelotas Basin. An exploration area of approximately 15,000 square kilometres (5,800 sq mi) was offered in the Brazil Bidding Round of 2017.

== See also ==
- Campos Basin
- Paraná Basin
- Santos Basin
