= Geology of South Africa =

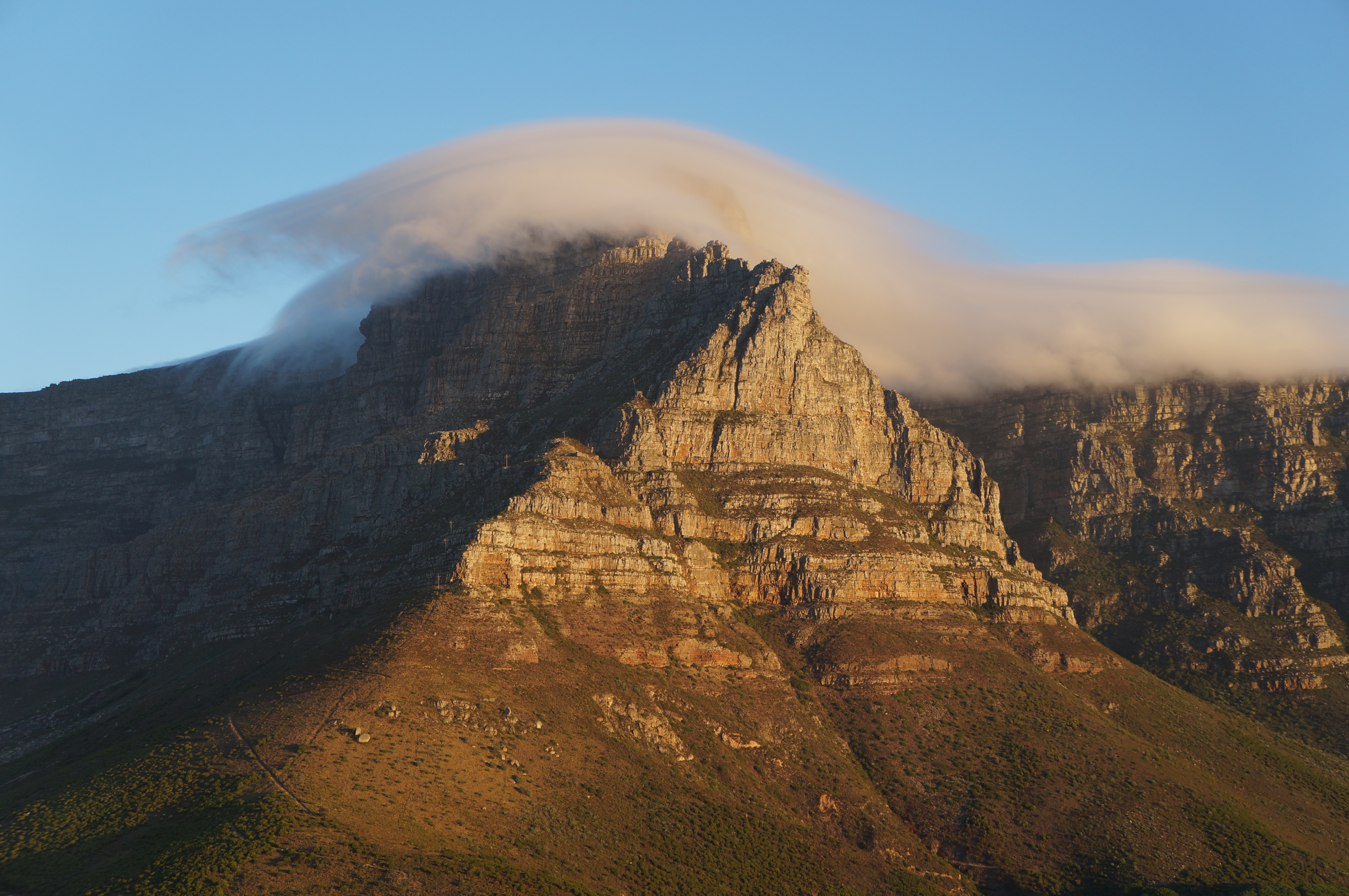
Table Mountain

The geology of South Africa is highly varied including cratons, greenstone belts, large impact craters as well as orogenic belts. The geology of the country is the base for a large mining sector that extracts gold, diamonds, iron and coal from world-class deposits. The geomorphology of South Africa consists of a high plateau rimmed to west, south and southeast by the Great Escarpment, and the rugged mountains of the Cape Fold Belt. Beyond this there is strip of narrow coastal plain.

== Cratons and orogens ==
The magenta-colored area shows the present-day extent of the Kaapvaal craton.

The basement of much of the northeastern part of South Africa is made up by the Kaapvaal craton. To the south and east, the craton is bordered by the Namaqua-Natal belt.

In Neoproterozoic times, much of South Africa stabilized into the large Kalahari Craton that came to form part of the supercontinent Rodinia. The Kalahari Craton was near the center of Rodinia with paleogeographic reconstructions indicating it was surrounded by the cratons of Laurentia, Río de la Plata, Congo and Dronning Maud Land. Evidence of this is the continuation of the Namaqua-Natal belt in East Antarctica indicating that South Africa and East Antarctica formed a single continent when this belt formed about 1000 million years ago.

== Tectonics and erosion since the Mesozoic ==
Since the Mesozoic the tectonics of South Africa have been shaped by an initial phase of rifting and then by episodic epeirogenic movements. South Africa is currently an elevated passive margin much like Eastern Greenland and the Brazilian Highlands. The uplift of these margins is tentatively related to far-field compressional stresses that has warped the region as a giant anticline-like lithosphere fold. These tectonics have had a profound effect in shaping the Great Escarpment and uplifting, creating and destroying plateaux including the African Surface, a key reference surface. On average, 2.5 to 3.5 km rock was eroded in the Mid to Late Cretaceous. Further erosion in Cenozoic times amount to less than one kilometer. Limited erosion means that many of the major relief features of South Africa have existed since the Late Cretaceous. Warping of Southern Africa has led to significant changes in drainage basins with the Orange River likely losing a drainage area in the Kalahari Basin, the Limpopo River losing interior drainage areas to the Zambezi River and the west-draining Karoo River ceasing to exist altogether. Overall, the boundaries of the drainage basins coincide with the axes of uplifted epeirogenic flexures.

Partridge and Maud (1987) links tectonics to three cycles of landscape development: African, Post-African I and Post-African II:

- African cycle: The break-up of Gondwana was accompanied by an eastward tilting of western South Africa and Namibia during the Late Cretaceous. The ensuring erosion cycle that begun with the Mesozoic rifting and uplift of Gondwana ended in the Miocene, albeit judging from offshore sediments erosion was minimal already in the Oligocene, an epoch that nevertheless was one of large-scale crustal deformation. It was during the African cycle, 70–40 million years ago that the etchplains that characterize the African Surface formed. By the Miocene the African Surface was at an elevation of 600 to 500 m.
- Post-African cycle I: Erosion increased again after 150–300 m of tectonic uplift tilted surfaces to the west in the Miocene. This erosion continued until the Pliocene. Albeit erosion surfaces were eroded into existence during the cycle no well-developed planation surface was formed. The Kalahari Basin accumulated large amounts of its sedimentary fill during this cycle as did also major oceanic basins surrounding the continent. Other sediments ended up making the formations of Uloa, upper Alexandria, Bredasdorp, Elandsfontyn, Varwater.
- Post-African cycle II: In the Late Pliocene the central-eastern parts of Southern Africa were uplifted up to 900 m. This uplift led to increased river incision along the coast and in the large inland rivers. While some planation surfaces were warped or eroded by the uplift a new was formed around the eastern Lowveld regions of "Zululand, Eswatini, eastern Transvaal, and inland of Algoa Basin". All of these surfaces developed in areas of weak rock. Elsewhere, surfaces resulting from erosion were not particularly flat. The drainage area of the Limpopo River decreased dramatically in Late Pliocene or Pleistocene times when its upper course was captured by the Zambezi River.

== Stratigraphy ==
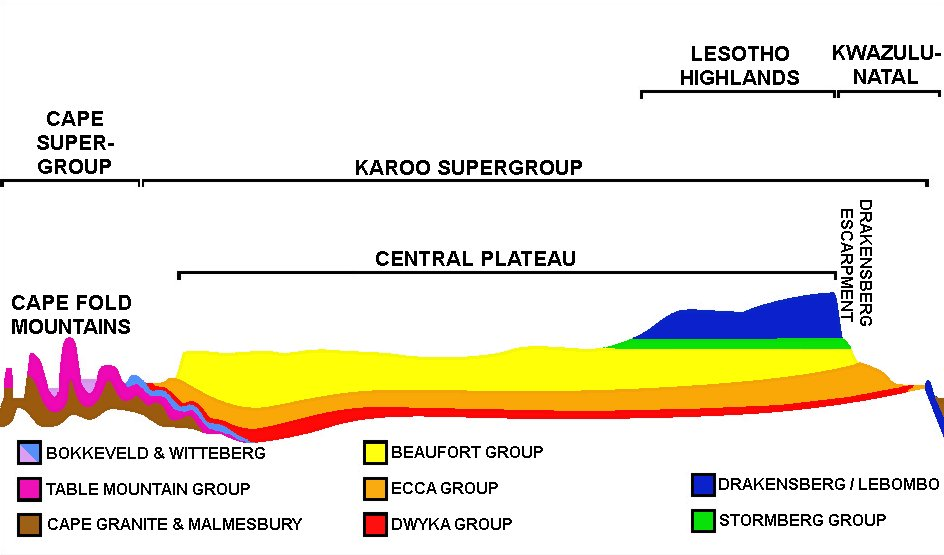
An approximate SW-NE geological cross section through South Africa, with the Cape Peninsula (with Table Mountain) on the far left, and north-eastern KwaZulu-Natal on the right. Diagrammatic and only roughly to scale to scale. The difference in both composition and structure of the Cape Fold Mountains and the Central Plateau surrounded by the Great Escarpment, in particular the Drakensberg, can clearly be seen.

=== Cape Supergroup ===
The Cape Supergroup is divided into several distinct Groups. The western and southern extents of the Supergroup have been folded into a series of longitudinal mountain ranges, by the collision of the Falkland Plateau into what would later become South Africa. However, the entire suite in this region slopes downwards towards the north and east, so that the oldest rocks are exposed in the south and west, while the youngest members of the Supergroup are exposed in the north, where the entire Cape Supergroup dives beneath the Karoo rocks. Drilling in the Karoo has established that Cape Supergroup rocks are found below the surface up to approximately 150 km north of their northernmost exposure on the surface. The Cape Supergroup extends eastwards beyond the Fold into the northern Eastern Cape and KwaZulu-Natal, where no folding took place.

=== Karoo Supergroup ===
The Karoo Supergroup is the most widespread stratigraphic unit in Africa south of the Sahara Desert. The supergroup consists of a sequence of units, mostly of nonmarine origin, deposited between the Late Carboniferous and Early Jurassic, a period of about 120 million years.

=== Transvaal Supergroup ===
The Transvaal Supergroup is a stratigraphic unit in northern South Africa and southern Botswana, situated on the Kaapvaal craton, roughly between 23 and 29 degrees southern latitude and 22 to 30 degrees eastern longitude. It is dated to the boundary between the Archean and Proterozoic eras, roughly 2,500 Mya. It is delimited by the Witwatersrand Basin (2,700 Mya) and the Bushveld Igneous Complex (2,050 Mya).

== Mineral resources ==
Diamond and gold production are now well down from their peaks. As of 2012, South Africa was the world's fifth-largest producer of gold but South Africa still possesses the world's second-largest reserves of gold. It is the world's largest producer of chromium, manganese, platinum, vanadium and vermiculite and the second largest producer of ilmenite, palladium, rutile and zirconium. South Africa is one of the ten largest coal producing countries in the world. South Africa is also a huge producer of iron ore; in 2012, it overtook India to become the world's third biggest iron ore supplier to China, which is the world's largest consumer of iron ore.

== Prince Edward Islands ==
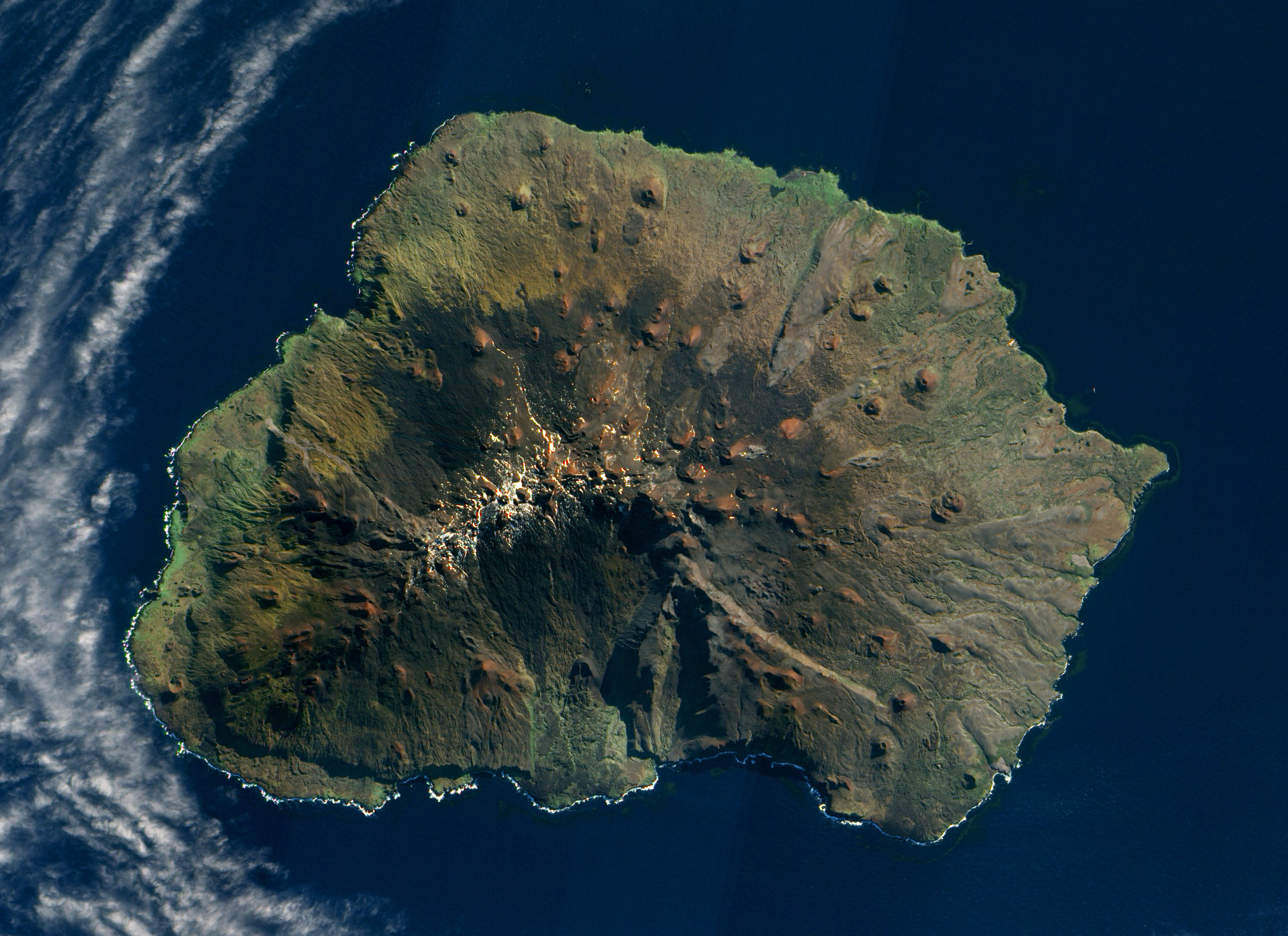
Marion Island

The Prince Edward Islands are a pair of islands in the south Indian Ocean; they are the country's only offshore islands. Both islands are of volcanic origin. Marion Island is the larger of the two islands and is one of the peaks of a large underwater shield volcano that rises some 5,000 metres (16,404 ft) from the sea floor to the top of Mascarin Peak. It is the only active South African volcano, with eruptions having occurred between 1980 and 2004.

== See also ==
- Geological Society of South Africa – South African learned society for geology
