= Ecca Group =

Geological strata in southern Africa

- Stratigraphic range: Late Late Carboniferous-Early Permian; ~303–290 Ma
- Type: Geologic group
- Sub-units: Western/Northwestern facies: Prince Albert Formation, Whitehill Formation, Collingham Formation, Tierberg Formation, Skoorsteenberg Formation, Kookfontein Formation, Waterford Formation.Southern facies: Prince Albert Formation, Whitehill Formation, Collingham Formation, Vischkuil Formation, Laingsburg Formation, Fort Brown Formation, Waterford Formation. Northeastern facies: Pietermaritzburg Formation, Vryheid Formation, Volksrust Formation
- Underlies: Beaufort Group
- Overlies: Dwyka Group

Lithology
- Primary: Shale, mudstone, claystone, siltstone, chert, dolomite, coal
- Other: Quartzite, pyrite

Location
- Region: Western & Eastern Cape
- Country: South Africa, Eswatini, Namibia, Botswana, Zimbabwe

Type section
- Named for: Ecca
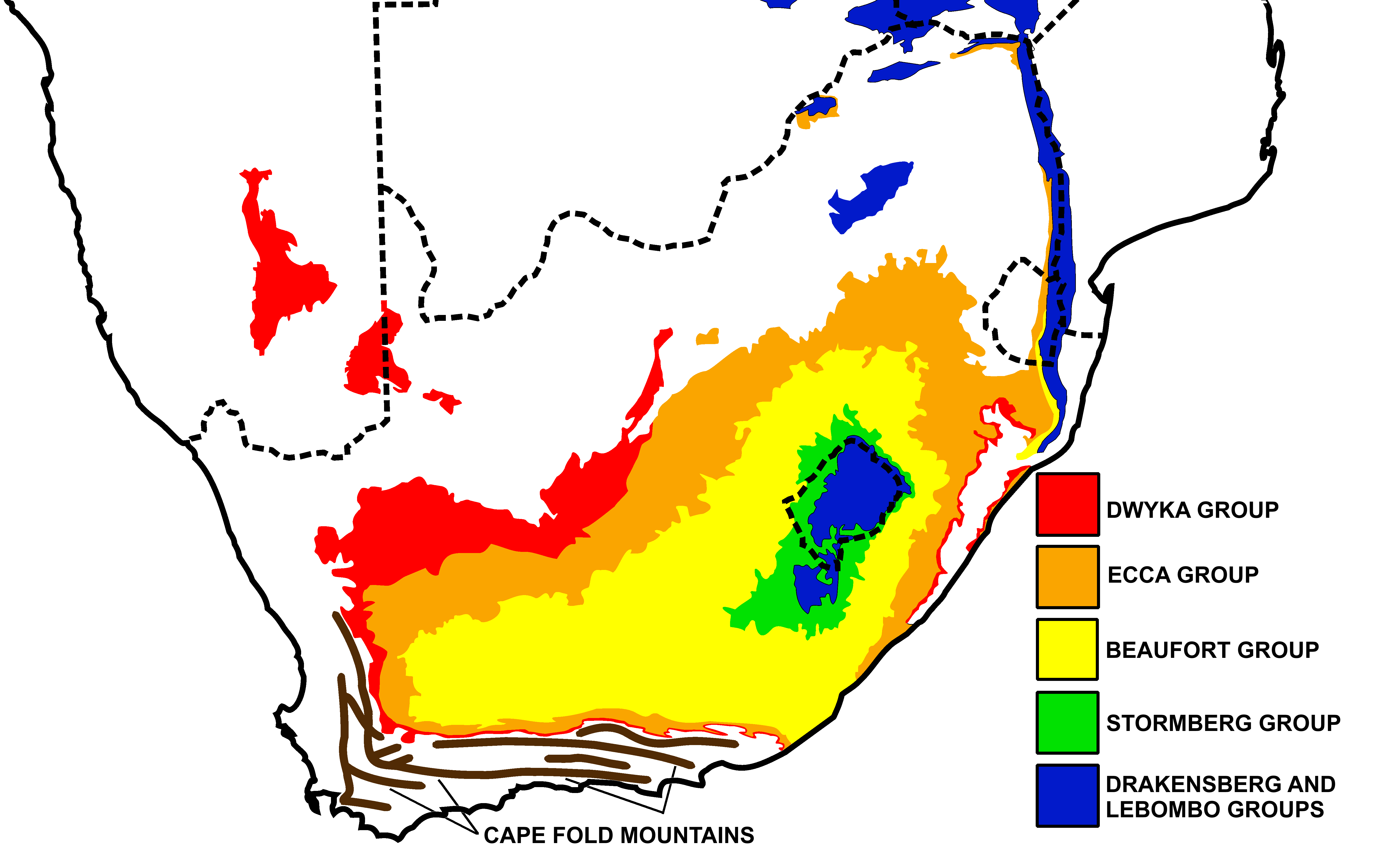
- A simplified geological map of the outcrops of Karoo Supergroup rocks in Southern Africa. The Ecca Group is represented by the orange key on the map.

The Ecca Group is the second of the main subdivisions of the Karoo Supergroup of geological strata in southern Africa. It mainly follows conformably after the Dwyka Group in some sections, but in some localities overlying unconformably over much older basement rocks. It underlies the Beaufort Group in all known outcrops and exposures. Based on stratigraphic position, lithostratigraphic correlation, palynological analyses, and other means of geological dating, the Ecca Group ranges between Early to earliest Middle Permian (Asselian - Roadian) in age.

== Background ==
During the time of the deposition of the Ecca Group, the depositional environment, with some exceptions, was predominantly marine. The Ecca sea was vast but shallow, reaching only around 500 m at its deepest in its west/northwestern and southern facies where the Tanqua and Laingsburg Depocenters are situated respectively. The marine environment ranged from deep pelagic, submarine fan systems in the lower deposits which grade steadily north-eastwards to shallow marine deposits including shelf (continental) marine and marginal marine facies, and finally to beach deposits in younger successions. Coal-bearing fluvial-deltaic, and peatbog settings are also well known from the Ecca Group.

The Ecca Group was deposited in a vast retroarc foreland basin. This foreland system was caused by crustal uplift (orogenesis) that had previously begun to take course due to the subduction of the Palaeo-pacific plate beneath the Gondwanan Plate. This resulted in the rise of the Gondwanide mountain range in what is known as the Gondwanide orogeny. The mountain-building and erosion caused by the growing Gondwanide mountain range was the initial subsidence mechanism acting on the Karoo Basin. Flexural tectonics partitioned the Karoo Basin into the foredeep, forebulge, and backbulge flexural provinces. This resulted in deposition of the Karoo Basin.

== Geographic extent ==
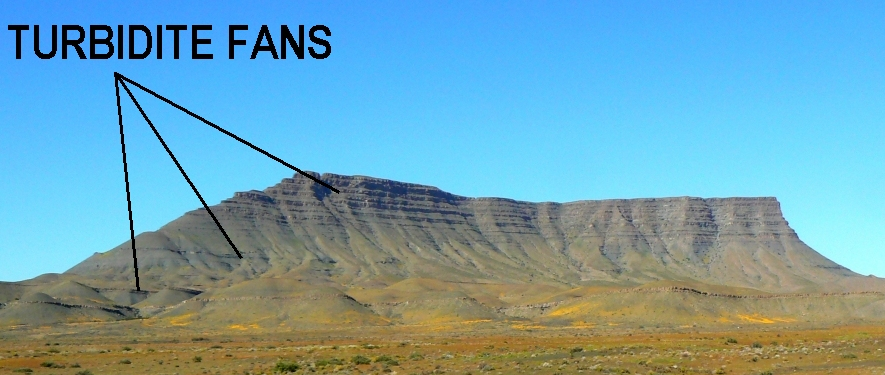
A mountain in the Tanqua Karoo, South Africa, with multiple layers of turbidites formed in the south-western portion of the Karoo Sea about 300 million years

The rocks of the Ecca Group first appear near Sutherland in its westernmost deposits, and continues east through Laingsburg, Prince Albert, Jansenville, Grahamstown, and up until the coast near Port Alfred. In the central north deposits are found near Britstown, running along the Orange River between Petrusville and Hopetown. In the extreme northeast deposits are found east of Johannesburg past Vryheid, Durban, Pietermaritzburg and all the way down to Port St. Johns in the southeast.

== Stratigraphic units ==
The Ecca Group comprises sixteen recognized geological formations. These individual formations have been grouped into three geographical areas, which are the southern, western/northwestern, and northeastern facies successions. In the east of South Africa there are deposits of as of yet undifferentiated mudstone sequences attributed to the Ecca Group.

With the exception of the Prince Albert, Whitehill, Collingham, and the uppermost Waterford Formations which are found in both the southern and western/northwestern facies, the geological formations of the Ecca Group can only be found in one of the three previously aforementioned facies successions. This is because each of these facies successions represents differing preserved environments that can be observed in their diagnostic geological features. The facies successions, along with their geological formations, are described below:

=== Western/Northwestern Ecca facies ===
This facies succession is purely marine. The rocks contain a complete transition, grading laterally into one other, from basin-floor marine deposits through to channelized submarine slope to shelf, pro-delta and beach environment deposits. The deposits of the western/northwestern facies fall within the Tanqua Depocenter, one of the vast submarine fan systems known from the marine Ecca. Associated formations are listed below (from oldest to youngest):

- Prince Albert Formation: In the west/northwestern facies the Prince Albert Formation is characterized by either greyish or olive micaceous or silty shale, carbonaceous shale, and rhythmites. Wackes and arenites are found in the northernmost section of the western/northwestern facies, and upward-fining sandstone and siltstone sequences that often contain ice rafted debris are a character diagnostic of its western outcrops. These rock sediments were deposited in a deep marine and distal submarine fan setting, and various invertebrate marine fossils, the chimaeroid cartilaginous fish Dwykaselachus oosthuizeni, palaeoniscoid fishes, and coprolites have been recovered from this formation.
- Whitehill Formation: Mudrock and shale dominant in the west/northwestern facies. The shale rock in this formation weather out white on the surface, often referred to in literature as the “white band”. It is the main diagnostic feature of this formation in this facies succession. The shales are carbonaceous and contain lenses of pyrite and chert. Fossil plant matter, palaeoniscoid fish, and arthropod remains are frequently found. The shales are considered to have been deposited in a suspension setting under anoxic, although shallower, sea floor conditions. Rare marine reptile fossils, most notably of Mesosaurus tenuidens, and another mesosaurid, Stereosternum tumidum, have been recovered from this formation.

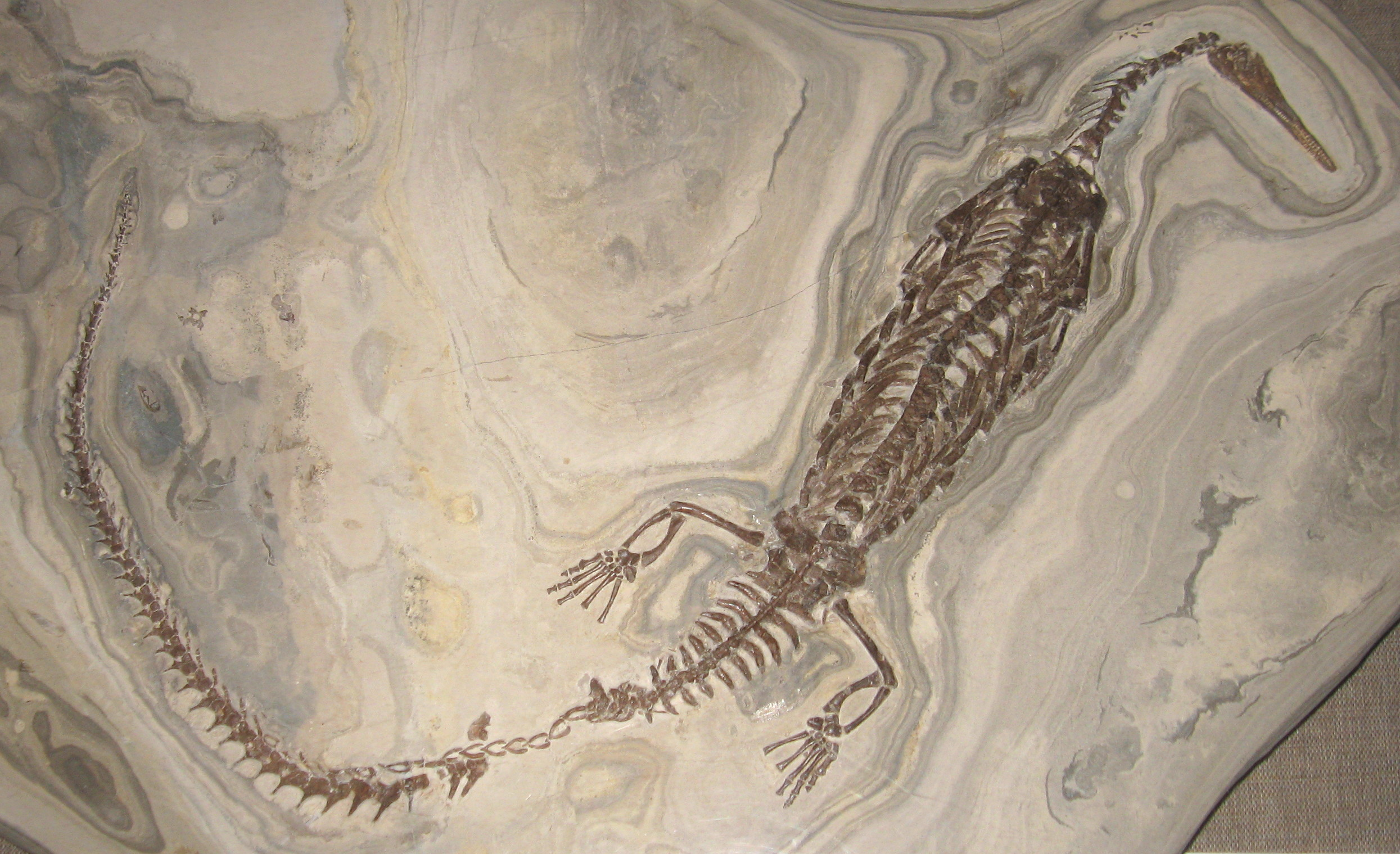
A fossil Mesosaurus tenuidens (syn.Mesosaurus brasiliensis), Permian (270 myo)

- Collingham Formation: Is composed of thin beds of siliceous, dark grey mudstone alternated with softer, yellow-grey tuff beds. The fine-grained nature of the sediments indicate that the depositional environment was a low energy suspension setting in a submarine fan environment. The presence of tuff beds indicates that volcanic activity took place during the time of sediment deposition.
- Tierberg Formation: Predominantly composed of blackish, planar, argillaceous shales. Tuff beds are found in the lower sections of this formation while calcareous concretions and clay pellet conglomerates are found in the upper sections. Upwards-coarsening sequences of mudstones, siltstones, and sandstones that exhibit ball-and-pillow structures are also found in the uppermost sections. The presence of the shales in the lower Tierberg indicate a low energy marine environment that transitioned to pro-delta to distal delta depositional environments with the appearance of the upward coarsening sequences and other associated geological features. Various invertebrate fossils have been recovered, namely fish scales, sponge spiracles, and trace fossils of Planolites and Nereites.
- Skoorsteenberg Formation: Only found in the southernmost area of the western facies. A lens-shaped formation composed of five sandstone-rich units that are interbedded with shale layers. These contain bouma turbidite sequences. The depositional environment is thought to have been an unstable delta-front slope of a fluvial delta system. Trace fossils of worm feeding trails and Glossopteris fossils are common.
- Kookfontein Formation: The lower section of this formation is composed of horizontally laminated dark-grey shales that are interbedded with clastic rhythmites. Minor upward thickening cycles are observed here which grow more prominent in the upper sections. The rock type changes in the upper sections to alternating siltstone and fine-grained sandstone beds. This formation is a continuation of the environmental facies of the Skoorsteenberg Formation where sediments were deposited in a pro-delta setting.
- Waterford Formation: The western/northwestern deposits of this formation are composed of a mix of shale, siltstone, rhythmite, and fine to medium-grained sandstones. The sandstones and siltstones are horizontally laminated and often exhibit wave-rippled surfaces. Alternating slump and slide and coarsening upward cycles are observed in the lower sections while in the upper sections ball-and-pillow structures and channel-fill deposits are observed. These features indicate that the depositional environment constituted delta front deposits in the lower sections which transitioned to a fluvial delta-plain. Fossilized tree logs are frequently found in the sandstone layers, and in the other rock layers Cruziana and Skolithos burrow traces are found. Together with the underlying Tierberg, Skoorsteenberg, and Kookfontein Formation, the Waterford Formation forms an upward-coarsening deltaic megacycle.

=== Southern Ecca facies ===
This facies succession is the largest of the three facies succession. Its lowermost formations are deep marine comprising basin floor pelagic sediments and submarine fan systems that grade upwards into channelized submarine slopes to shelf marine and beach environments. The Laingsburg Depocenter is found in this facies succession and include the following formations (from oldest to youngest):

- Prince Albert Formation: Black to dark grey chert layers with yellowish grey weathering are only known from the southern facies. These rock sediments were deposited in a deep marine and distal submarine fan setting. Various invertebrate marine fossils, palaeoniscoid fishes, and coprolites have been recovered from this formation.
- Whitehill Formation: In the southern facies the Whitehill Formation loses its diagnostic white band marker horizon. The rock type changes here to light brown, fine-grained sandstone and siltstone deposits that contain carbonate concretions. Tuff deposits also occur intermittently. It is regarded as a distal, southern equivalent of the Vryheid Formation.
- Collingham Formation: The southern facies deposits of this formation yield diagnostic pale yellowish-grey chert, often referred to in literature as the “Maijiesfontein Chert Bed”.
- Vischkuil Formation: Dominated by dark coloured shale in its westernmost outcrops which grade into greywacke sandstones in the east. The shale layers alternate with subordinate sandstones, siltstones, and minor yellow-grey tuff deposits. The shale layers often contain calcareous and phosphatic lenses, and also liesegang rings. The depositional environment is considered to have been deep marine within a basin-plain or outer basin-floor fan. The presence of tuff layers indicates that volcanic activity took place during the time of deposition.
- Laingsburg Formation: Composed of four, massive sandstone units that are interbedded with planar-laminated shale and siltstones. Calcareous concretions and clay pebble clasts are often found in the massive sandstones. Coalified plant fragments are frequently found in the shale and siltstone layers. It grades laterally into the upper Ripon Formation in the east.
- Ripon Formation: Consists mainly of tabular, poorly-sorted fine-grained sandstones. The sandstones alternate with dark-grey clastic rhythmite composed of thin, sandstone/siltstone layers. Spherical, calcareous concretions are found in the sandstone layers along with larger, brown-weathering calcareous structures. Various deformation structures, namely load casts and slump structures, are found here. Invertebrate fossil trackways and burrows occur throughout this formation. All these are indicative of a deep-water depositional environment. Carbonised plant fragments and fossil logs are also found.
- Fort Brown Formation: Rhythmites of alternating sandstone/siltstone or siltstone/claystone layers, carbonaceous shales, and mudrocks, which are usually olive grey in color, are extremely common. The rhythmites and mudrock comprise the bulk of the lower deposits of the Fort Brown Formation. Minor impure sandstone wacke intercalations are found in its upper sections, displaying horizontal, wavy, ripple, and ripple-drift cross lamination. Tuffs are sometimes found due to the Cape Orogenic event taking place during the time of deposition. The mudrocks and shales are extremely fine-grained, finely laminated and are considered to represent shelf marine facies that were deposited in a pro-delta setting. Fragmentary plant hash material and invertebrate trace fossils are found here.
- Waterford Formation:This formation is exposed along a series of east-west trending synclines and anticlines. It is rich in sandstones, which are generally light in colour and are frequently interbedded with dark-grey to light yellowish grey siltstone and sometimes mudstone. Well-preserved symmetrical wave ripples are often found in the sandstone layers. Outcrops of this formation are extremely diagnostic as a result of the alternating “bands” of sandstone and siltstone This is thought to represent a marginal marine setting either within the intertidal zone or within a delta or beach setting.

=== Northeastern Ecca facies ===
The northeastern facies is shallow marine in its lowermost and uppermost sections, and then changes to coal-bearing fluvial-deltaic peat swamp settings in its central deposits. The northern facies often overlies unconformably on much older basement rocks unlike the other facies of the Ecca Group. It comprises three geological formations (from oldest to youngest):

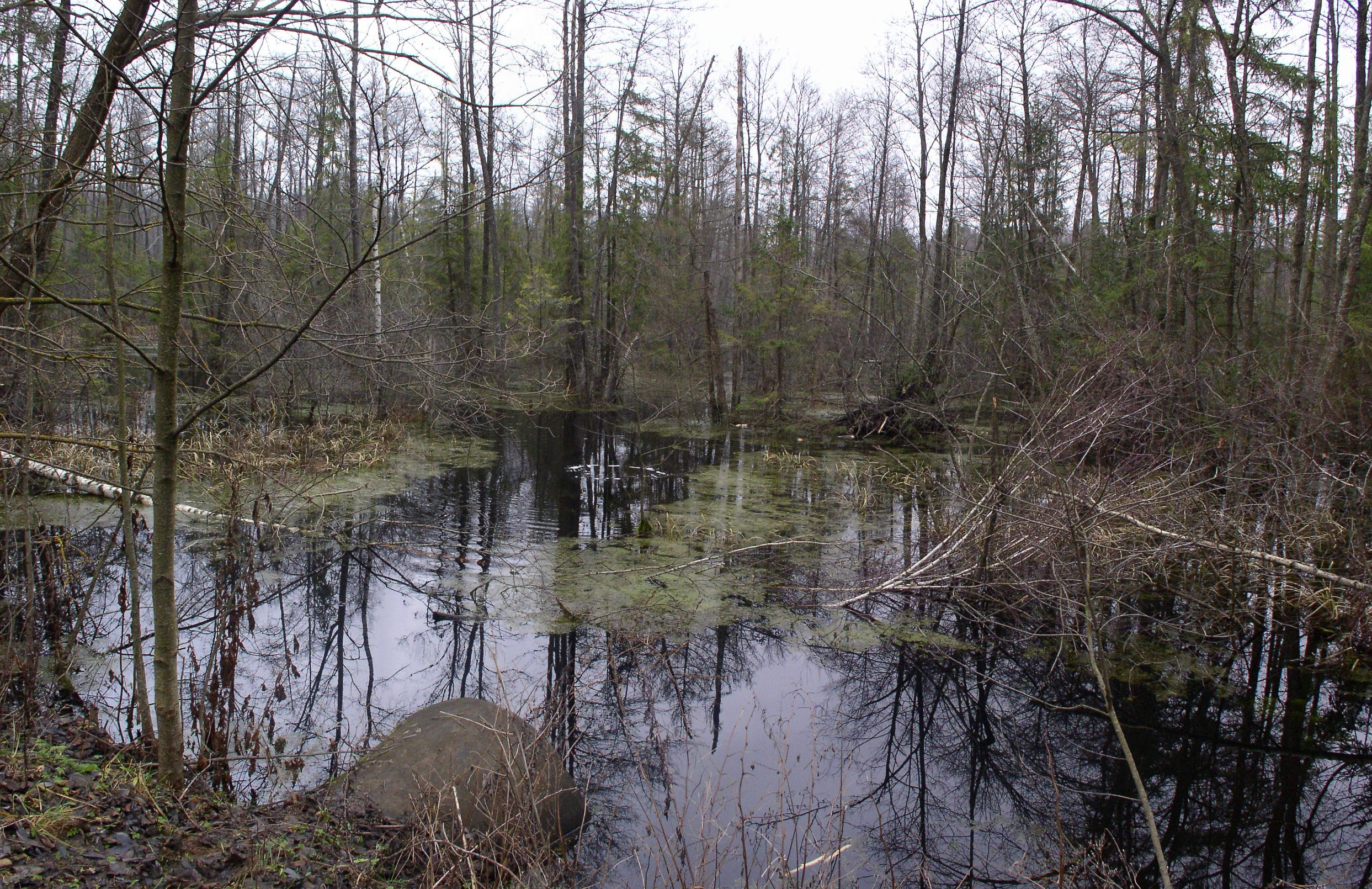
Example of a peat swamp environment, similar to the depositional environment preserved in the Vryheid Formation rocks. Plant material would have sunk below surface to the bottom of the swamp, being preserved in the anoxic environment. Over time plant material would be compacted and buried by sediment. Over millions of years the plant material mineralized, becoming coal

- Pietermarizberg Formation: Generally composed of dark colored carbonaceous and silt-rich shale rocks, siltstone, and mudstone with subordinate sandstone layers. This formation is only found in the easternmost section of the northeastern facies succession and is not well studied due to poor outcrops and exposures. The majority of the data collected from this formation have been from borehole cores. In addition exposed outcrops quickly erode out due to the sub-tropical climate of KwaZulu-Natal where deposits of this formation are only found. Sporadic fossil plant material and various invertebrate trace fossils have been found, and the depositional environment is thought to be shallow marine.
- Vryheid Formation: This formation has been subdivided into three different lithofacies arrangements. They are dominated by fine-grained mudstone, carbonaceous shale with alternating layers of bituminous coal seams, and coarse-grained, bioturbated immature sandstones respectively. The rock sediments are predominantly arranged in upward-coarsening cycles, although some fining-upward cycles are found in this formation's easternmost deposits. The alternating rock types observed in the Vryheid Formation indicate seasonal variations of storms and fairer weather in a pro-delta setting. The carbonaceous shales were formed below the water surface in anoxic conditions and the coal formed from compacted plant matter deposited at the bottom of peat swamps. These swamps formed on abandoned alluvial plains where stagnant water accumulated. The Vryheid Formation reaches a maximum of 1030m in Nongoma, KwaZulu-Natal, within the Nongoma Graben. Diverse Glossopteris fossil coal floras are known from the Vryheid Formation, including their fertile organs and fruitifications, lycopods, rare ferns such as Asterotheca hammanskraalensis, horsetail species such as Annularia, cordaitales, conifers, ginkgoales, rare fossil wood, and diverse palynomorphs. Abundant, low diversity trace fossils, namely of Skolithos, Diplocraterion, Helminthopsis and planolites, rare insects, possible conchostracans, non-marine bivalves, and fish scales. The coal seams themselves are classified as compaction fossils.
- Volksrust Formation: Mainly comprises silt-rich, grey to black shale containing thin, bioturbated siltstone or sandstone lenses. Deposits of this formation interfinger laterally with the underlying Vryheid Formation and overlying Beaufort Group rock deposits. The rock sediments are fine-grained overall, indicating that the rock sediments were deposited in both lacustrine to lagoonal and shallow coastal settings. A large pelecypod marine bivalve has been recovered from this formation.

== Correlation ==
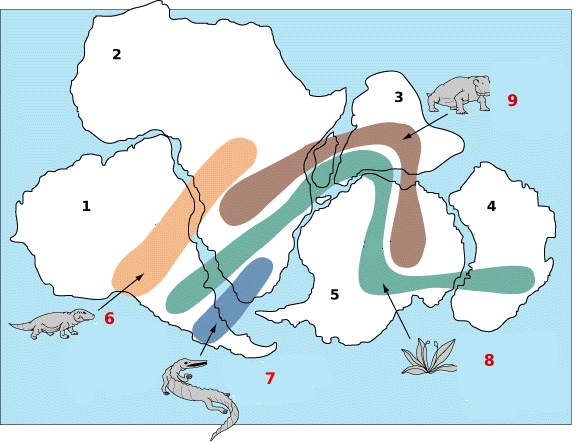
Biostratigraphic correlation of fossils in the greater Gondwana across present-day South America, southern Africa, Antarctica and Australia

The lower geological formations of the Ecca Group, particularly the rocks of the Whitehill Formation, correlate in age with the Huab Basin of northwestern Namibia, and lower formations of the Kalahari Basin found in Namibia, Botswana, and Zimbabwe. Near the small town of Khorixas in Namibia there is a locally well-known national monument called the Petrified Forest. Petrified logs were brought into the area and are considered to have been sourced from the nearby deposits of the Huab Basin.

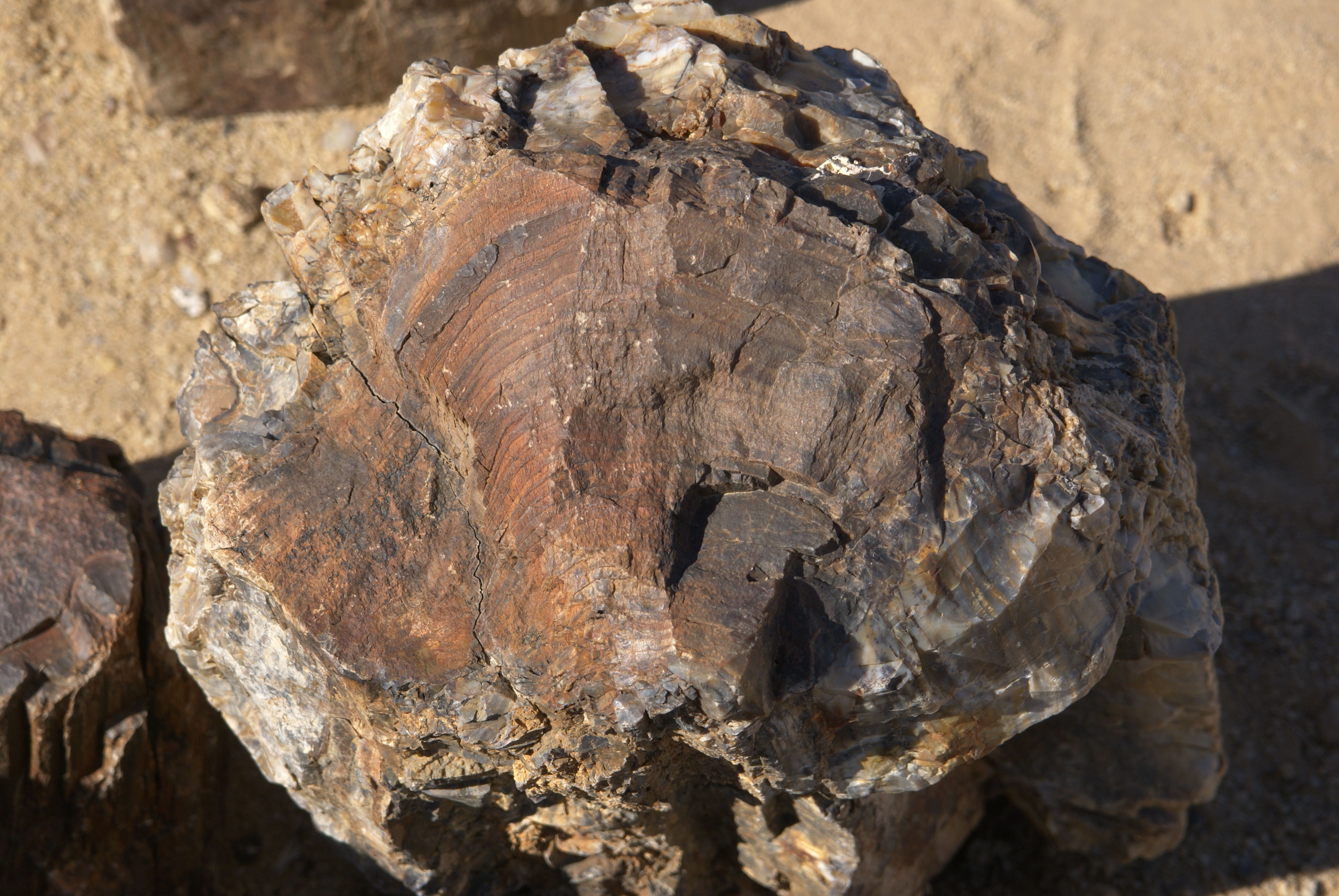
Fossil tree from the Permian Ecca Group of the Karoo Sequence at the petrified forest, east of Doro !Nawas, Namibia

Abroad, Ecca-aged deposits are known from the Paraná Basin of Brazil and the Petolas Basin of both Brazil and Uruguay where fossils of Mesosaurus and Glossopteris have also been recovered. Finally, geological dating has also proven the lower Ecca formations to correlate with the Barnett Shale and Marcellus Formation of the United States.

== See also ==
- Geology of South Africa
- Geography of South Africa
