= Otjihaenamparero dinosaur tracks =

Trace fossils in Namibia

Coordinates: 21.0423°S 16.4052°E

The Otjihaenamparero dinosaur tracks are a set of different fossil tracks located at the Otjihaenamparero farmstead, 23 kilometres (14 mi) east of the small town of Kalkfeld in the Otjozondjupa Region in central Namibia. The tracks were first reported as dinosaur imprints in 1925 and the site has in 1951 been declared a national monument.

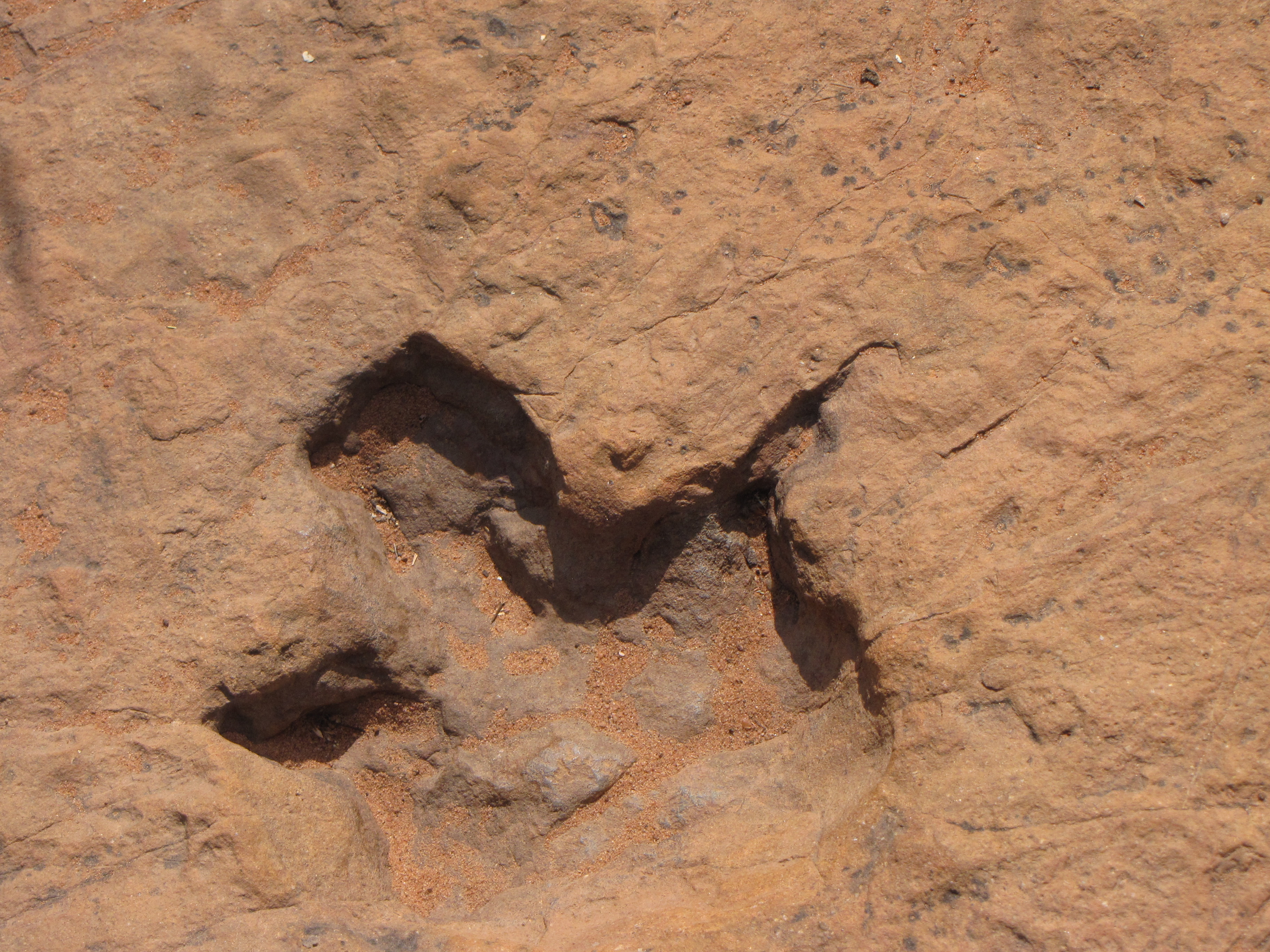
Dinosaur trace fossil of Otjihaenamparero

== Dinosaur tracks ==
The tracks occur in Etjo Sandstone and were first reported as dinosaur footprints by Friedrich von Huene in 1925. The tracks are believed to be from animals that moved near waterholes in an increasingly arid ecosystem. Over time, the tracks were covered with sand that then solidified into rock. All imprints appear to stem from a three-toed and clawed foot, likely from the hind feet of bipedal dinosaurs. There are two crossing tracks, counting more than 30 individual imprints of 12-15 cm in length and 80 cm apart. An additional track consists of several imprints of 7 cm length that are 28-33 cm apart. The longest traces in the Etjo Sandstone are about 32 metres (105 ft) in length. They belong to at least two different species of the ichnogenus Saurichnium, Saurichnium damarense and Saurichnium tetractis.

== Preservation ==
The site was designated a national monument in 1951.

== See also ==
- List of fossiliferous stratigraphic units in Namibia
- Geology of Namibia
- Etjo Sandstone
