= Geology of Namibia =

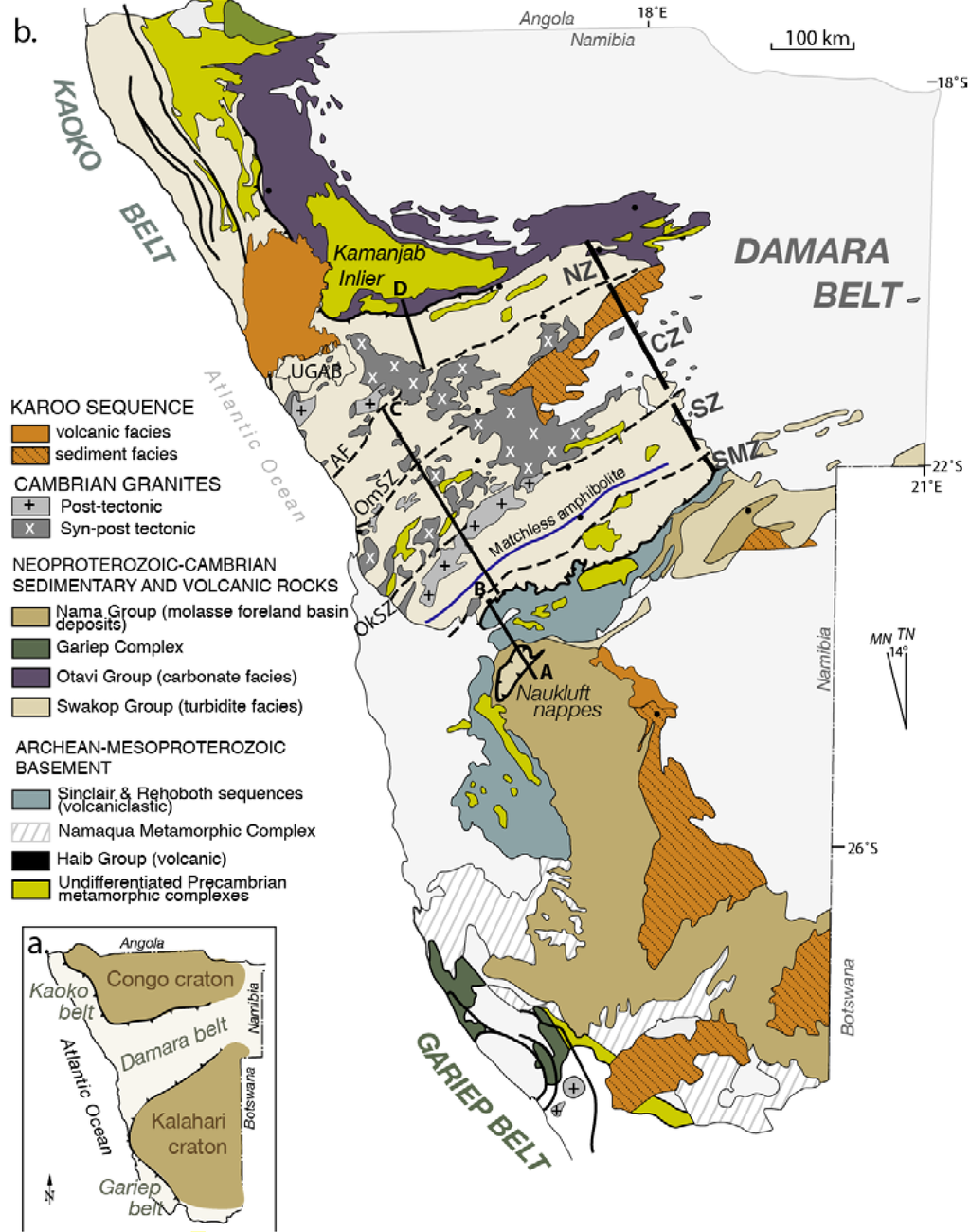
Geological map of Namibia showing the Damara Belt separating the Congo and Kalahari Cratons

The geology of Namibia encompasses rocks of Paleoproterozoic, Mesoproterozoic and Neoproterozoic and Paleozoic to Cenozoic age. About 46% of the countryʼs surface are bedrock exposure, while the remainder is covered by the young overburden sediments of the Kalahari and Namib deserts.

The country is famous for its mineral deposits of Tsumeb, as well as many geological sites of interest, from paleontological, geomorphological and volcanic character. Due to the exposure of the formations in a desert climate and the former German colony, the geology of Namibia is relatively well studied compared to the more tropical less exposed northern neighbors.

== Stratigraphy and tectonics ==
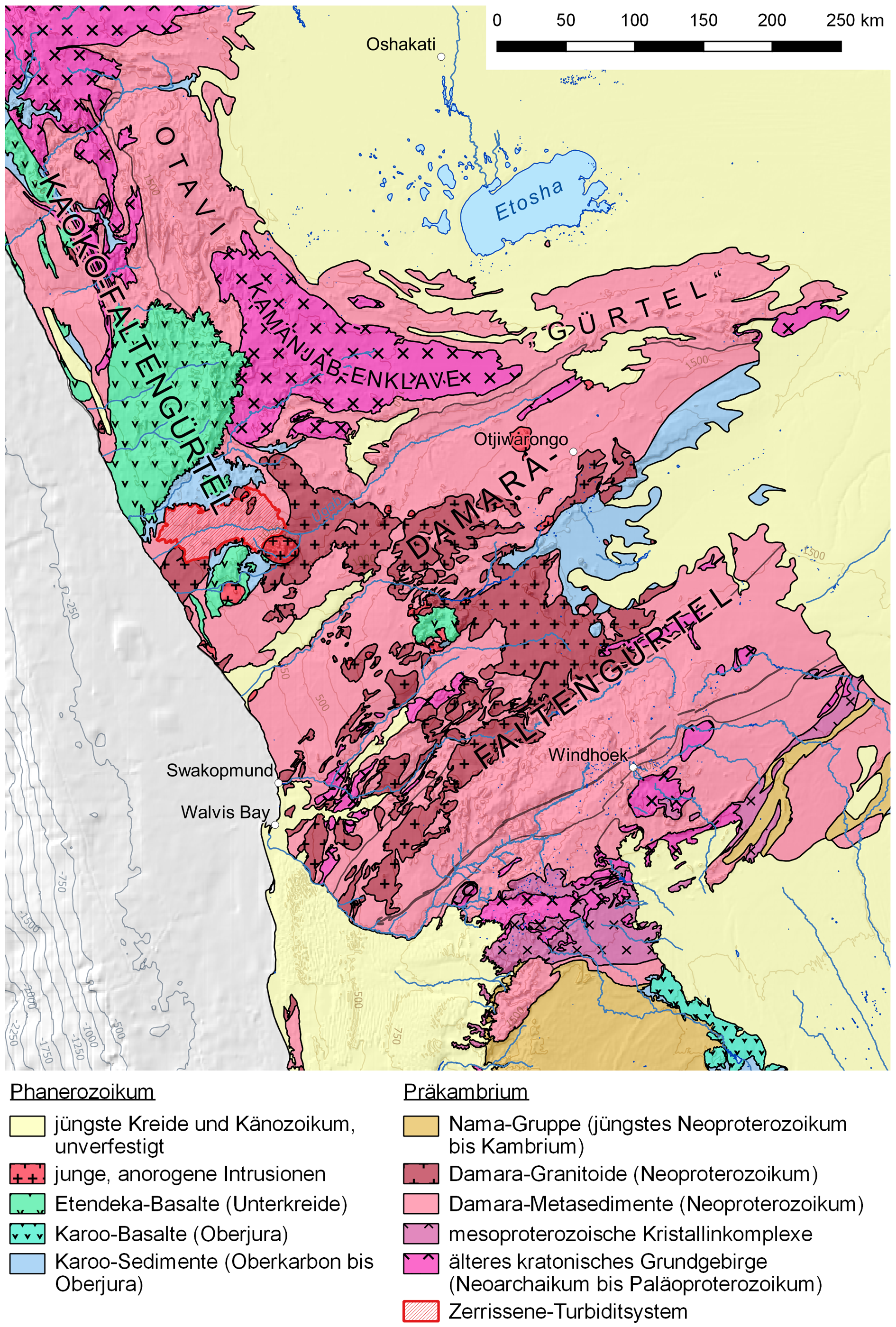
Geological map of central Namibia

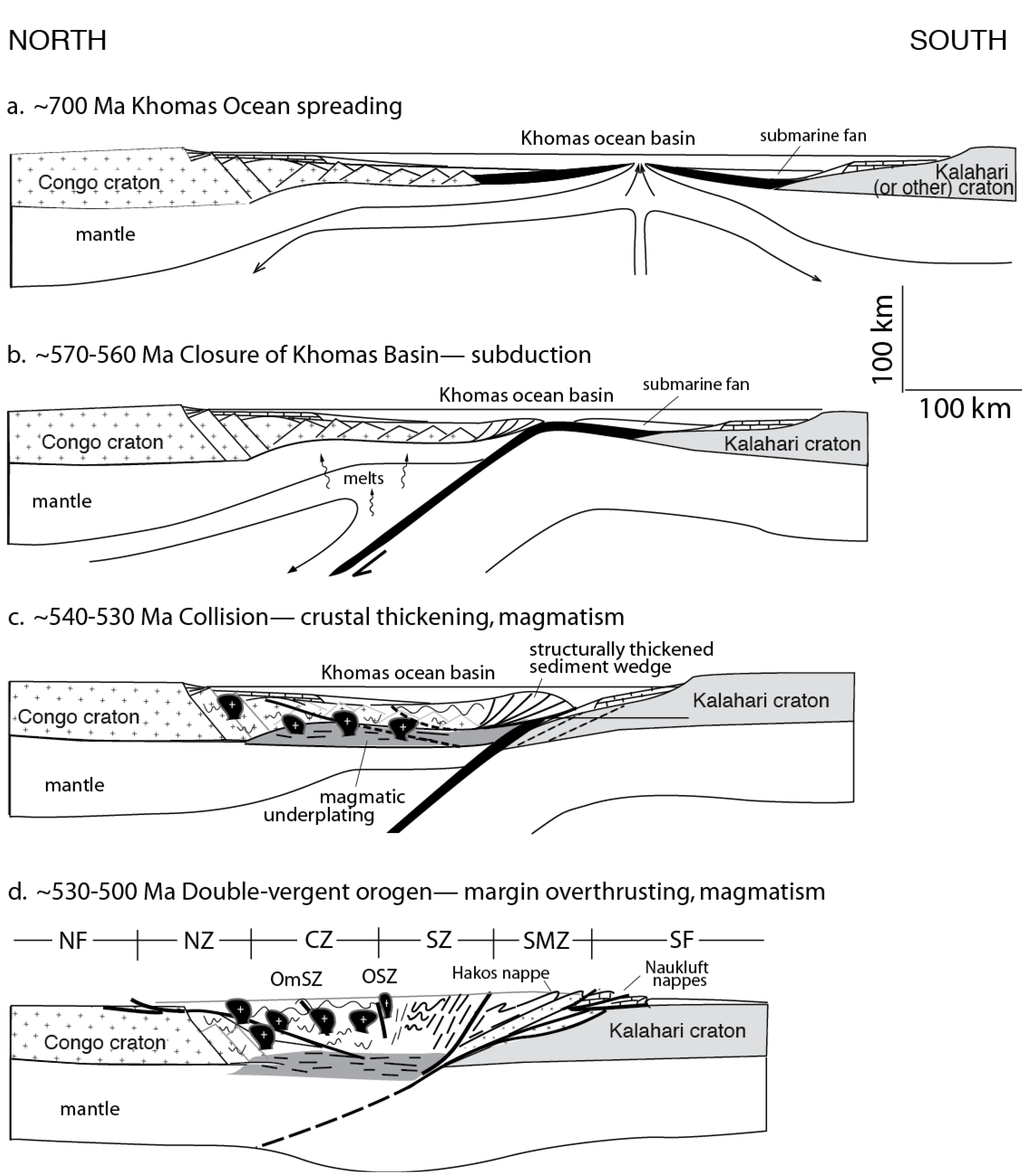
Tectonic evolution of the Damara Belt

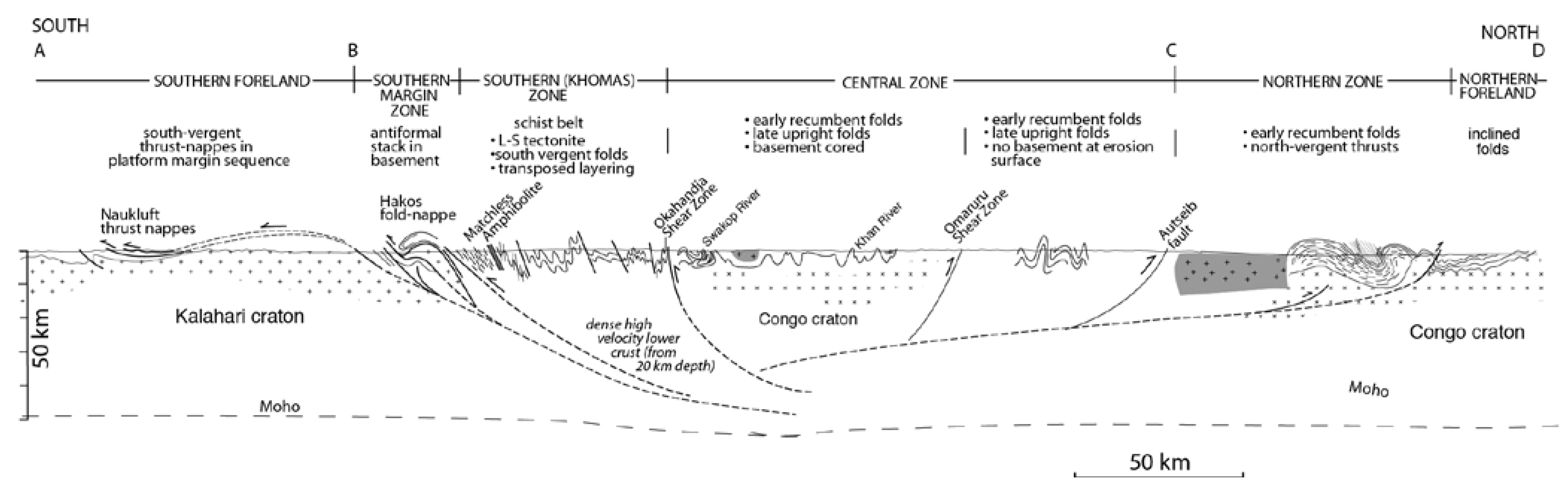
Cross-section of the Damara Belt

Large areas of the Namibian geology exposed onshore are associated with the Late Proterozoic Pan-African orogenic cycle. The geology of Namibia is dominated in the north by metasediments of the Neoproterozoic Damara Belt (or Namibian System), while in the south large areas are underlain by the unmetamorphosed, relatively undisturbed sediments of the Cambrian Nama Group. Locally, within the Damaran terrain, inliers of older basement occur, for instance in the extreme northwest at the Kunene River the oldest rocks of the country belong to the Paleoproterozoic (about 2,100 Ma) Epupa Metamorphic Complex. Only slightly younger are metamorphic rocks of the Huab Complex west of Outjo. Similar ages are also recorded from rocks of the Grootfontain Metamorphic Complex in the northeast of the country.

The Rehoboth-Sinclair Complex in Namibiaʼs southwest is of late Paleoproterozoic or Mesoproterozoic age. The Epupa and Huab Complexes were attached to the Congo Craton, whilst the Grootfontain and the volcano-sedimentary formations of the Rehoboth-Sinclair Complexes were assembled with the Kalahari Craton. The Namaqua Metamorphic Complex consists of metasediments originally eroded from the Congo and Kalahari Cratons. Granitic and metabasic intrusions also occur. It is of Mesoproterozoic age and covers large areas in the south and southwest of the country. Of Neoproterozoic age are the rocks of the Damara Orogenic Belt, which are widespread in central and northern Namibia. These are high grade metamorphics, but granitic intrusions are also frequent. In the Neoproterozoic Damara Orogen and Gariep Belt, mineralisation is associated with successive phases of intracontinental rifting (copper, graphite), spreading and the formation of passive continental margins. The overlying rocks of the Nama Group in central southern Namibia consist of marine sediments indicating a shallow shelf environment, deposited during the Ediacaran and earliest Cambrian. The clastic components of the Nama Group were mainly derived from the Damara Orogenic Belt, while the basal pelites and carbonates have eastern provenance areas.

No deposition is recorded from the Cambrian until the beginning of the Karoo episode, which in its initial phase is characterized by glacial sediments of the Dwyka Group. This type of rocks is well-distributed in the Kaokoveld of northwest Namibia. It is followed by continental sediments of the Omingonde Formation of the Ecca and Stormberg Groups in central Namibia. The Permo-Triassic Karoo Sequence is intruded by mostly Mesozoic dolerite sills and dyke swarms, which, together with extensive basaltic volcanism and alkaline sub-volcanic intrusions, are related to the breakup of Gondwana, and the formation of the South Atlantic Ocean during the Cretaceous. The currently last chapter of the geological history of the country is represented by the widespread Cenozoic to recent deposits of the Kalahari Sequence.

=== Sedimentary basins ===
Sedimentary basins of Namibia
Owambo Basin
Orupembe Basin
Huab Basin
Waterberg Basin
Nama Basin
Warmbad Basin
Dordabis Basin
Witvlei Basin
Klein Aub Basin
Sinclair Basin
Namibe Basin
Walvis Basin
Lüderitz Basin
Orange Basin

Namibia hosts the following sedimentary basins:

On/offshore	Name	Location	Notes
Onshore	Orupembe Basin	Kunene Region	
Onshore	Huab Basin	Kunene Region	
Onshore	Etosha, Rundu or Owambo Basin	Kavango Region; Otjozondjupa Region; Omaheke Region	
Onshore	Waterberg Basin	Otjozondjupa Region	
Onshore	Kalahari or Nama Basin	Omaheke Region; Hardap Region ǁKaras Region	
Onshore	Karasberg or Warmbad Basin	ǁKaras Region	
Onshore	Dordabis Basin	Khomas Region; Omaheke Region	
Onshore	Witvlei Basin	Omaheke Region	
Onshore	Klein Aub Basin	Erongo Region	
Onshore	Sinclair Basin	Hardap Region	
Offshore	Namibe Basin	Northwest	
Offshore	Walvis Basin	Northwest	
Offshore	Lüderitz Basin	West	
Offshore	Orange Basin	Southwest	

=== Paleontology ===
While fossiliferous stratigraphic units are relatively rare in Namibia, the unique Ediacaran to Early Cambrian biota of the Nama Group are a major paleontological highlight. The Late Carboniferous to Early Permian Ganigobis Formation has provided fossil fishes and the younger White Hill, Huab and Gai-As Formations of the Dwyka Group contain Mesosaurus fossils. The Mesozoic is represented by the Triassic Omingonde Formation comprising therapsid fossils and the Early Jurassic Etjo Sandstone with dinosaur trackways. The Eocene Buntfeldschuch and Langental Formations contain numerous fossil fish and the Early Miocene Elisabeth Bay Formation shows a diverse fauna with snake and mammal fossils.

=== Roter Kamm crater ===
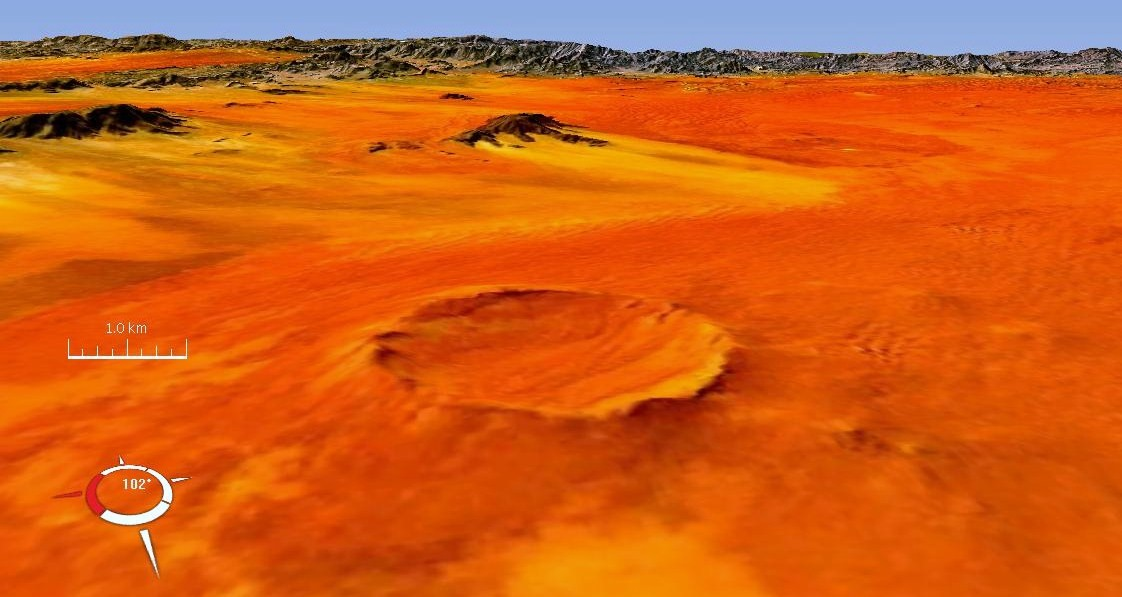
Roter Kamm crater

The Pliocene Roter Kamm crater is a 2.5 kilometres (1.6 mi) diameter and 130 metres (430 ft) deep circular impact crater in ǁKaras Region in the Kalahari Desert, about 80 kilometres (50 mi) north of Oranjemund. The age is estimated to be 4.81 ± 0.5 Ma and the crater is exposed at the surface, but its original floor is covered by sand deposits at least 100 metres (330 ft) thick. The meteor that hit it was approximately the size of an SUV.

== Economic geology ==
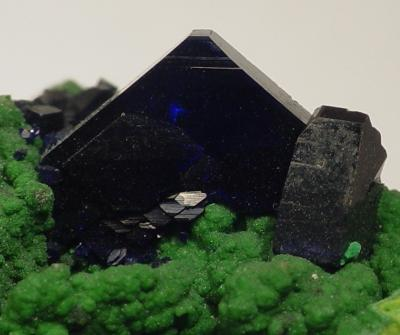
Arsentsumebite and azurite

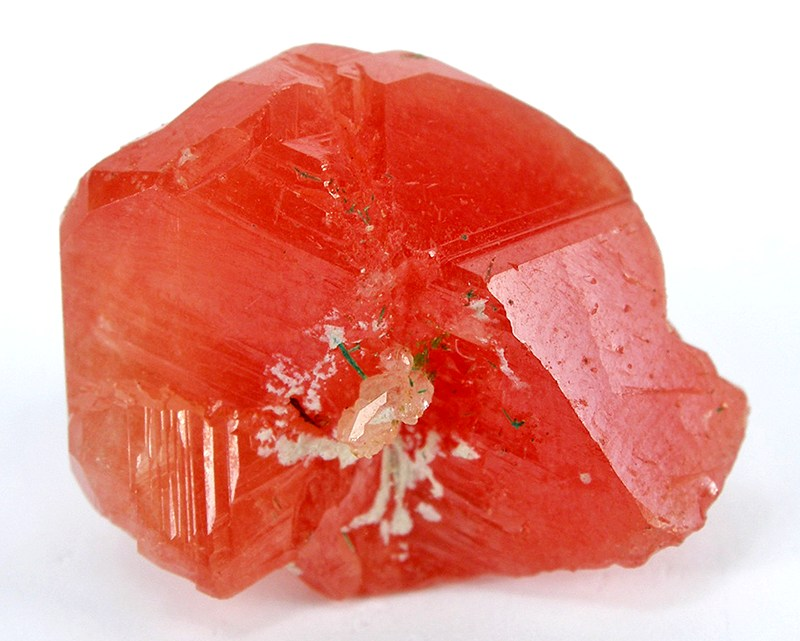
Blood red cerussite due to inclusions of cuprite

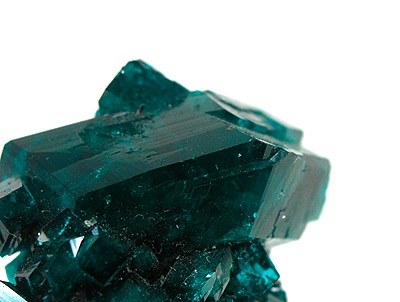
Dioptase

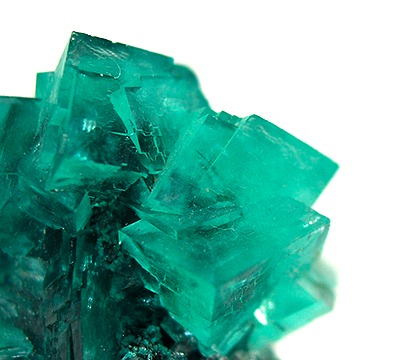
Smithsonite

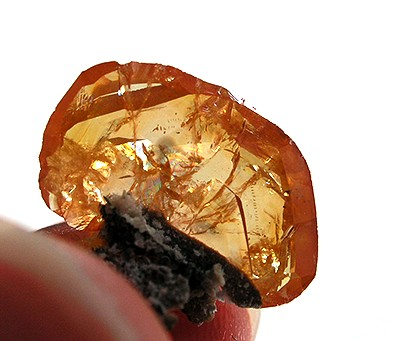
Wulfenite

Tsumeb is a world-famous site for minerals. In the district, 309 different minerals are recorded and the area hosts 72 type localities of minerals and one first reported locality of an unapproved mineral, zinclavendulan, a variety of lavendulan. The minerals arsentsumebite (Pb_{2}Cu(AsO_{4})(SO_{4})(OH)) and tsumebite (Pb_{2}Cu(PO_{4})(SO_{4})(OH)) are named after Tsumeb.

Targets for mineral exploration have been identified throughout the stratigraphic column. Metamorphic complexes host a variety of prospective environments such as copper-molybdenum porphyry, volcanic base metals and gold, volcanogenic copper, sedimentary lead and zinc, fluorite, shear zone gold, and beryllium-niobium-tantalum mineralization. Paleoproterozoic to Mesoproterozoic rocks locally contain extensive red bed copper, while calc-alkaline units of the same age have potential for porphyry and hydrothermal copper, as well as vein-type gold mineralization. Namibia is one of the major producers of diamonds, 95% of which are of gem quality. The bulk of the countryʼs known diamonds occur along the southern coastline, north of the Orange River mouth.

The diamonds originated in the interior of southern Africa and were transported by the Orange River to the Atlantic coast, where they were deposited within beach sediments. Almost the entire coastline is covered by exploration and mining licenses. Offshore mining techniques have been pioneered in Namibia and the country has firmly been established as the world leader in marine diamond mining. Inland, in the vicinity of Gibeon, 60 barren pipes of kimberlite of post-Karoo age have been identified. The northeast of the country also hosts some kimberlites, which are currently being explored for their diamond potential. The main occurrences of gold are in the Karibib and Rehoboth regions, the Omaruru area and the Kunene region. Silver is present in several deposits mined principally for their copper, lead and zinc contents.

It is found in the ore bodies of Tsumeb, Kombat and Rosh Pinah mines. Graphitic deposits in the Damara Sequence, calcrete hosted deposits of the Tertiary and sedimentary deposits in sandstones of the Karoo Supergroup, are the three major types of uranium hosting lithologies in Namibia. The deposits at Rössing and Valencia are of granitic origin. In the mid-2000s, Rössing was the countryʼs only producer of uranium. Major base metal production in Namibia includes copper, lead and zinc. Large-scale mining of base metals, especially copper, plays an important role in the economy of the country. Copper occurs at several locations, but is dominated by the Damara deposits: Otavi Mountainland (including the defunct Tsumeb Mine) and the Matchless Amphibolite Belt of the Swakop Group. Minor amounts come from Rosh Pinah. A feasibility study of the Skorpion zinc project has confirmed that Skorpion could rank as one of the worldʼs largest integrated zinc mining and refining operations. Haib, at the border with South Africa, is a classic porphyry copper-gold-molybdenum deposit featuring oxide and sulphide copper with a predominance of chalcopyrite in the sulphide ores.

Salt is recovered on a large scale from coastal solar evaporation pans in the Swakopmund and Walvis Bay areas, and at Cape Cross. The Okorusu Fluorspar Mine produces high quality acid-grade fluorspar. The Okanjande graphite deposit near Otjiwarongo is composed of high quality flake graphite, but the mine has not yet gone into operation. Wollastonite is produced in the Usakos area. Namibia also produces a variety of semi-precious stones through both small and medium-scale mining. tourmaline, aquamarine, heliodor, morganite, rose quartz, smoky quartz, garnet, chrysocolla and dioptase are quarried in various parts of the country. Marble, granite and other dimension stone for export or local processing are produced between Swakopmund and Karibib.

=== Petroleum geology ===
The Namibian Atlantic margin is conjugate with the Pelotas Basin of Rio Grande do Sul and northeastern Uruguay. Both basins are compared to their northern counterparts, for the Walvis Basin in Namibia the Kwanza Basin of Angola, and for the Pelotas Basin the Santos Basin of Brazil, underexplored. Apart from the discovery of the offshore Kudu Gas Field, exploration intersected oil-prone source rocks in boreholes, of merely five wells until 2004. The Walvis Basin is bound by the Walvis Ridge, which formed a barrier in the opening of the Southern Atlantic in the Aptian leading to salt basins to the north and basins without evaporite deposits to the south. The ridge, in South America correlated with the Rio Grande Rise, both related with the Tristan da Cunha hotspot, also represents the boundary between volcanic and non-volcanic areas to the south and north respectively. Cenomanian-Turonian oil-prone source rocks have been penetrated by wells in the Walvis Basin.

Namibia imports all its power station requirements. A large low-grade coalfield was found near Aranos, at depths of 250 to 300 metres (820 to 980 ft). Large, low-grade anthracite coal deposits are located along the coastline between the Huab River and Toscanini. Industrial mineral production in Namibia includes salt, fluorspar, wollastonite and dimension stone.

== Geological sites ==
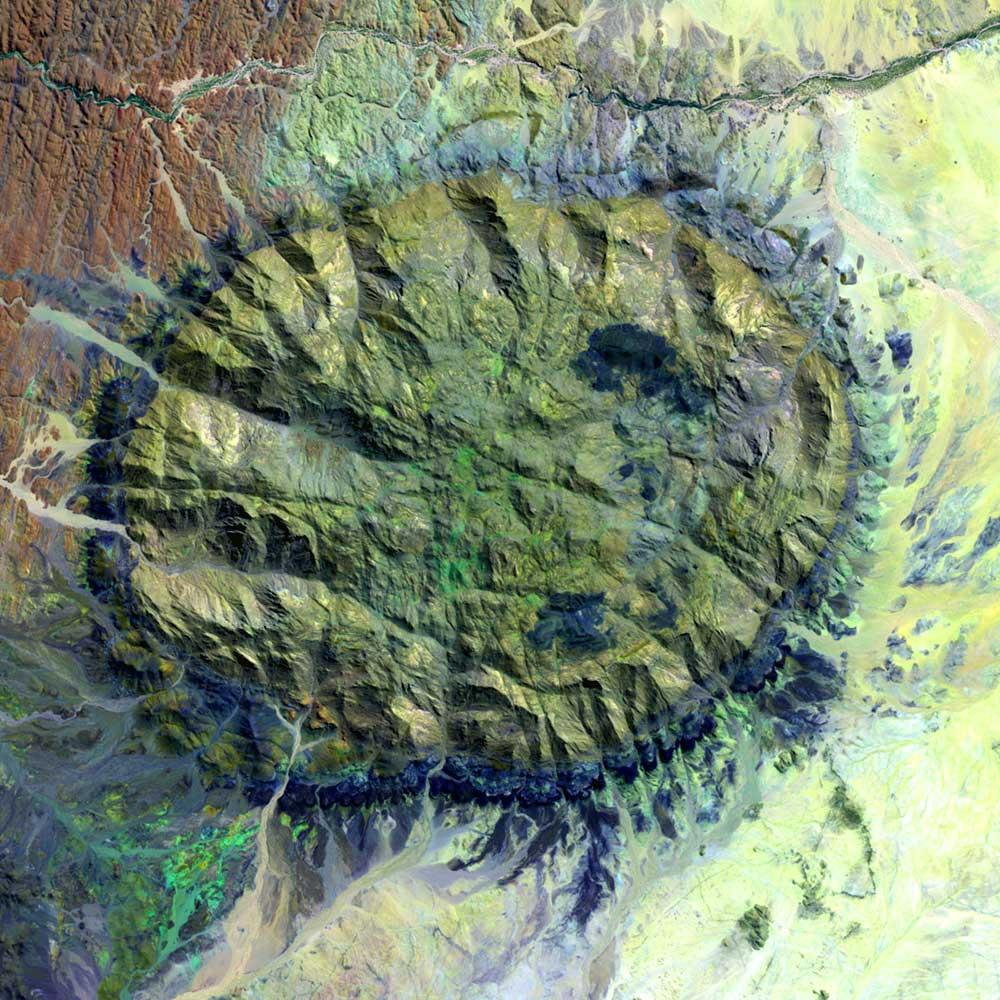
Brandberg massif

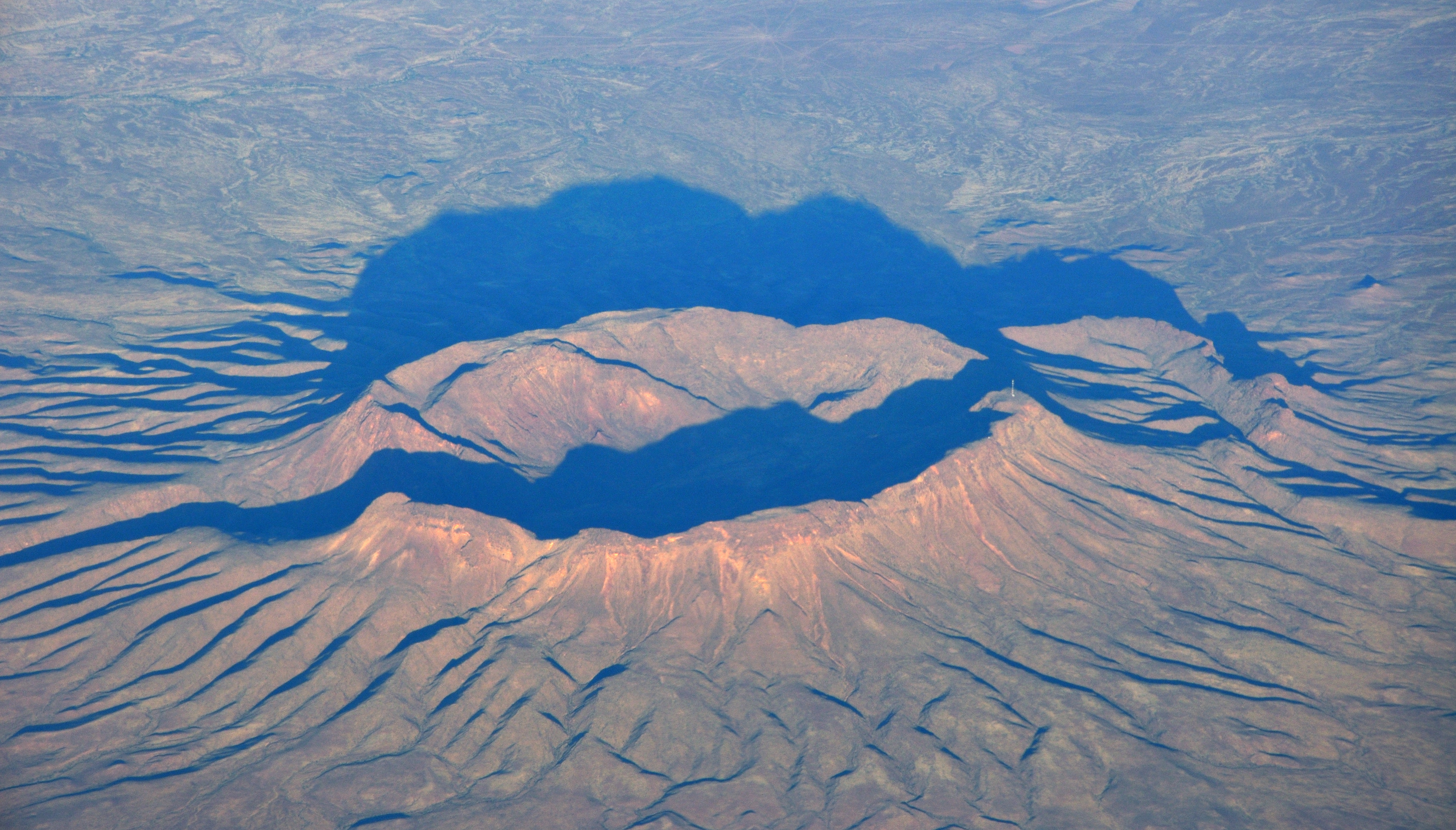
Brukkaros volcano

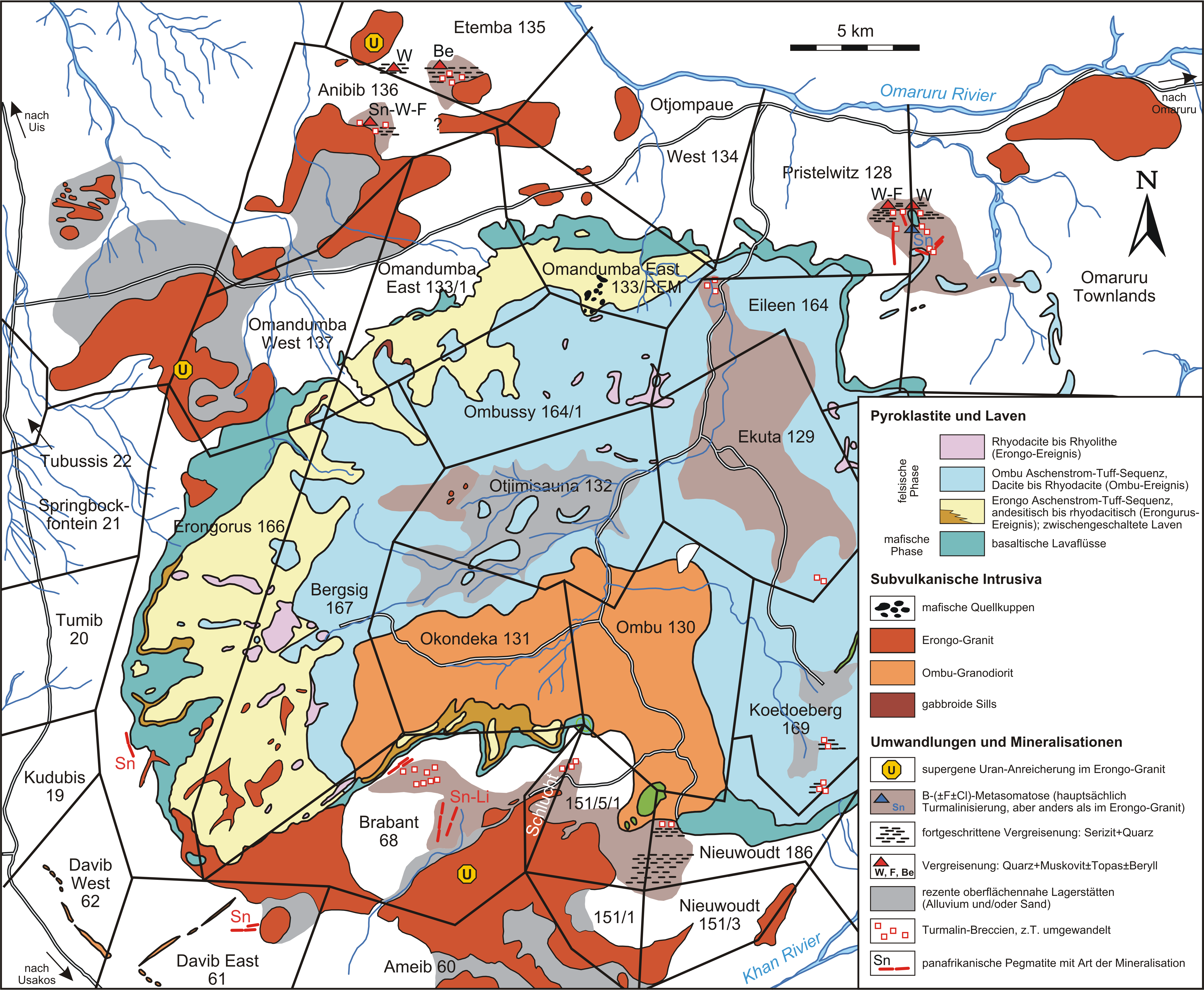
Geological map of Erongo

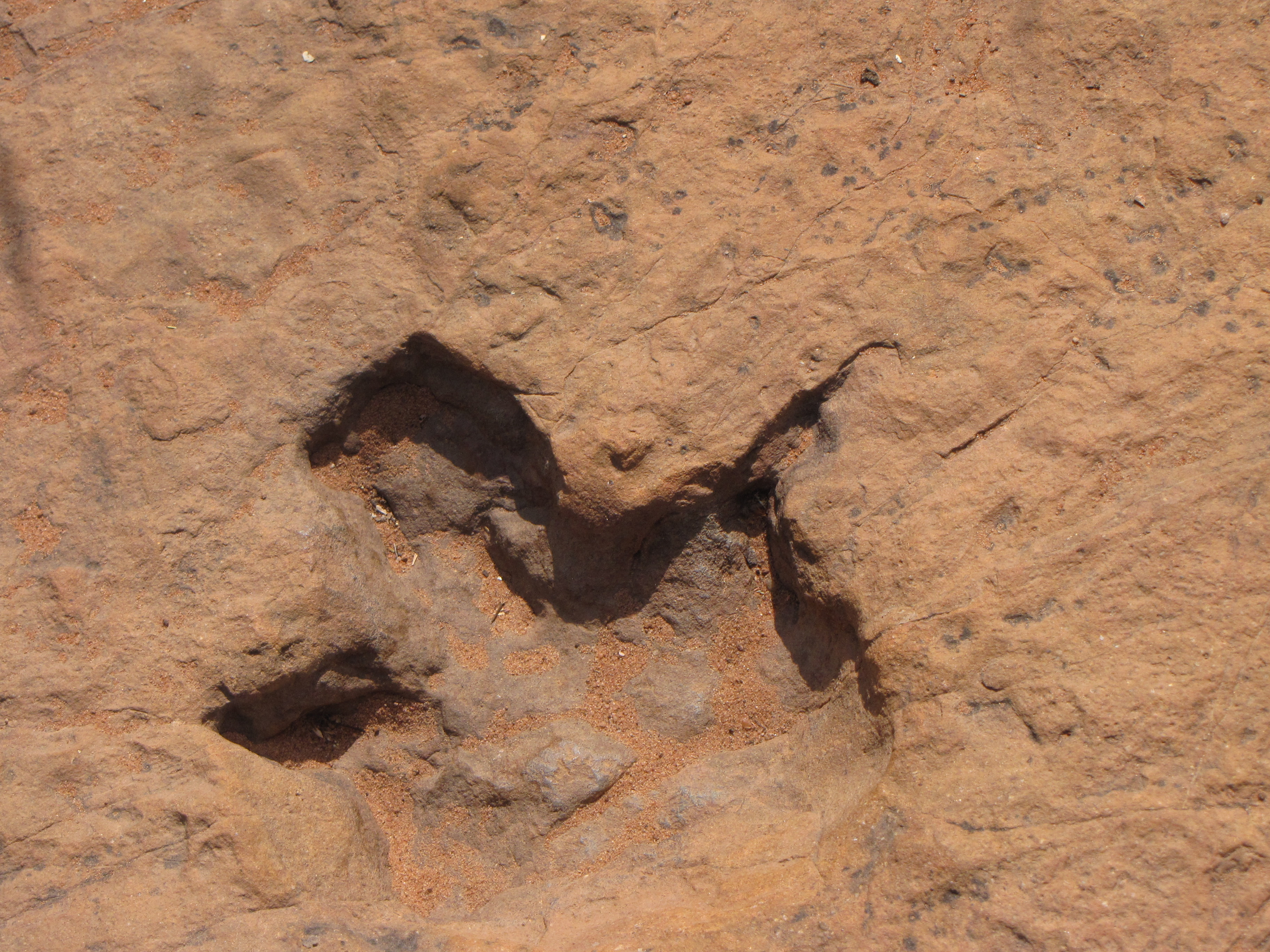
Dinosaur track at Otjihaenamaparero

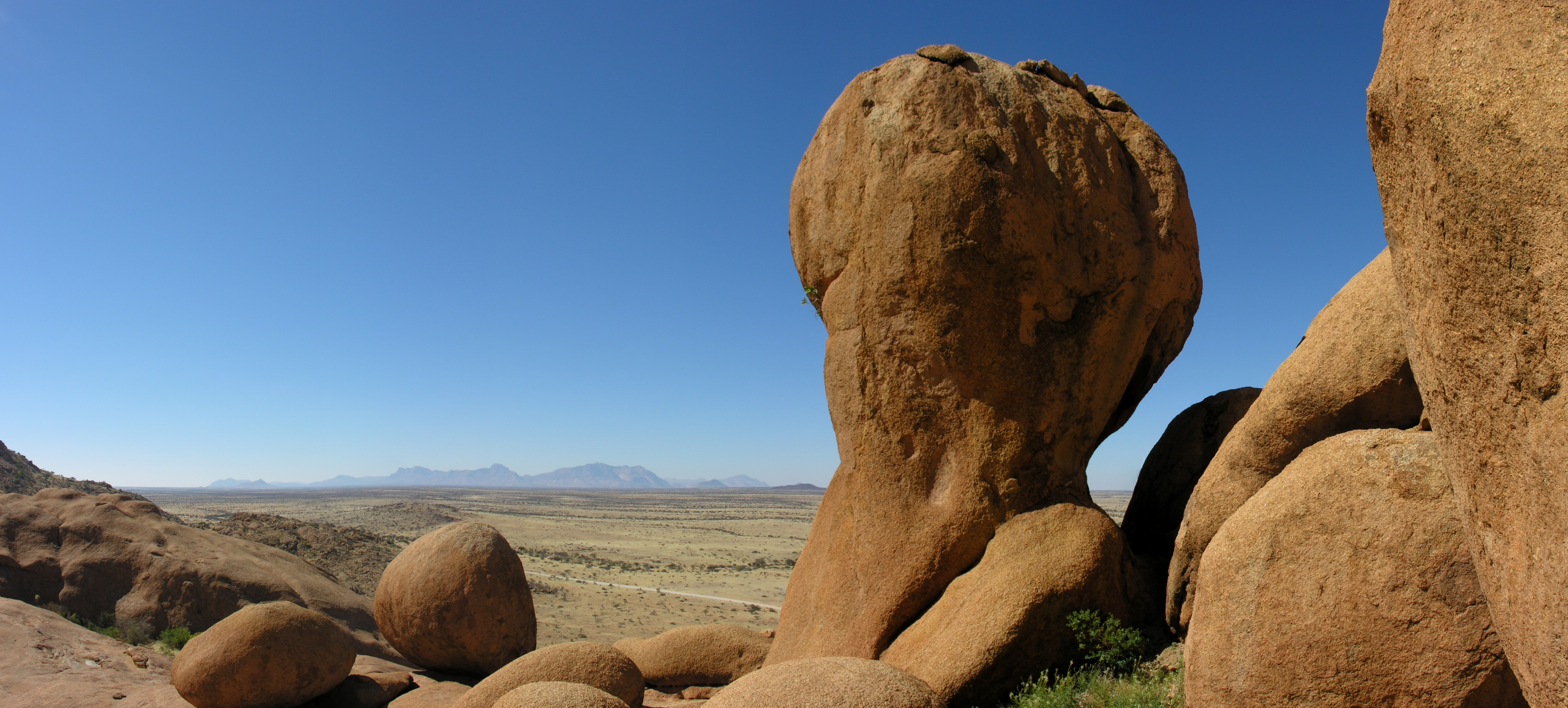
Bushman's Paradise at Spitzkoppe

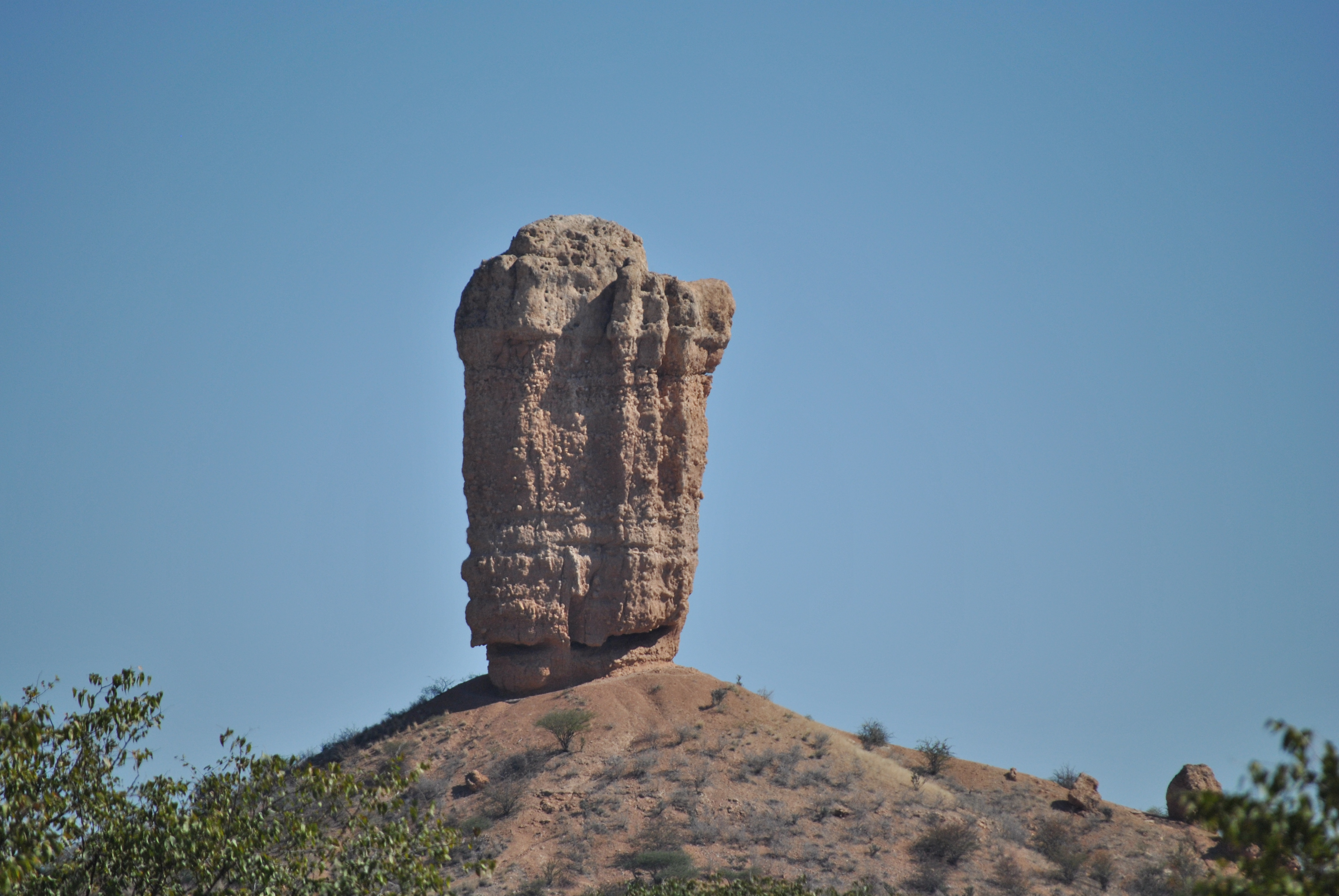
Vingerklip

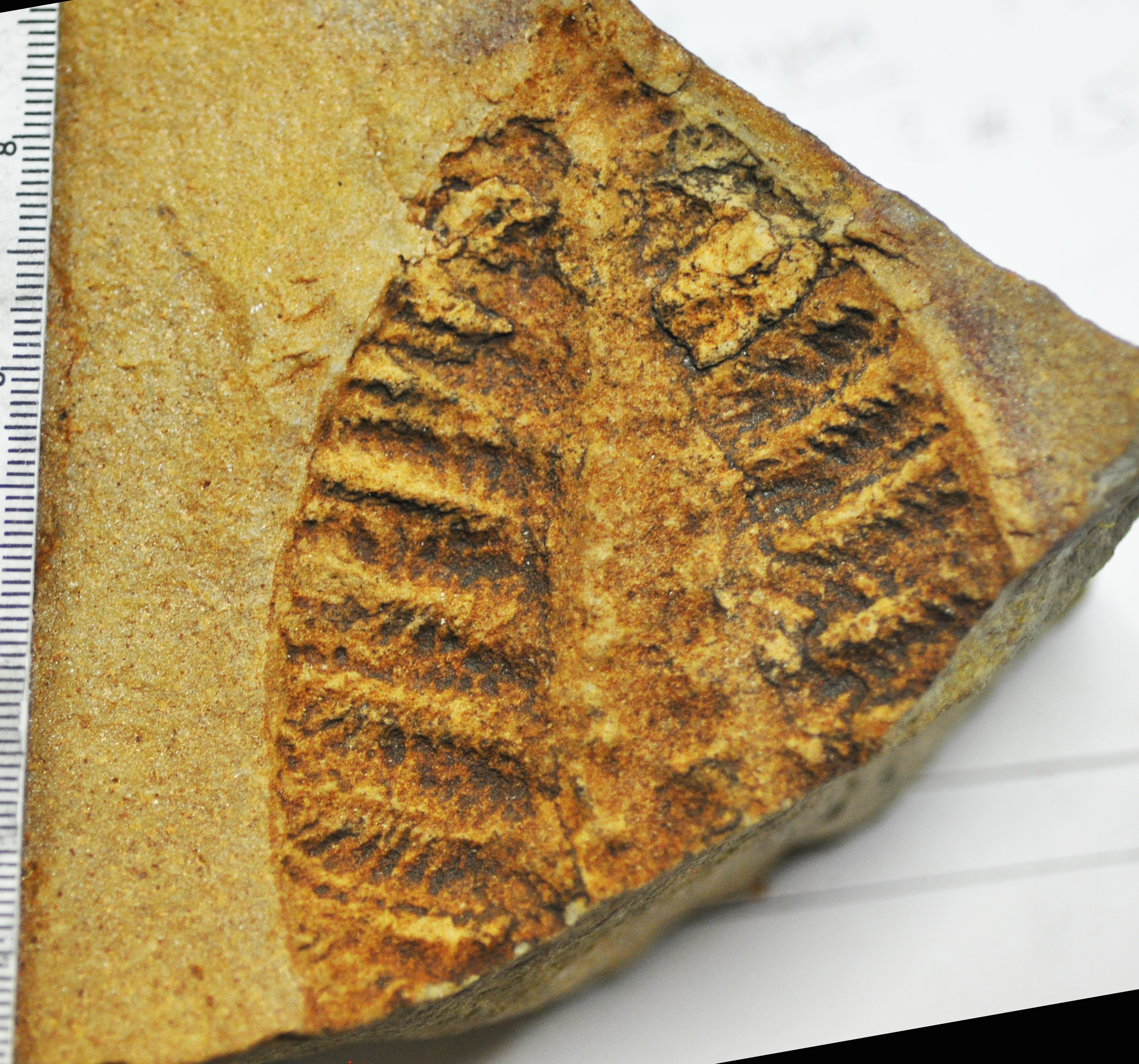
Rangea scheiderhoehni is one of the special fossils from Namibia which is from the Ediacaran period. Specimen found in the Ediacaran Kliphoek member of the Dabis Formation on Farm Aar, near Aus, Namibia.

Namibiaʼs geological exposures contribute to a wide variety of geological sites. Some of them have already been protected, but some are unfortunately already spoiled. A formal inventory has provided 32 sites:

- Brandberg
- Brukkaros Mountain
- Burnt Mountain
- Dieprivier
- Dolerite Hills
- Etendeka Plateau
- Erongo
- Etosha Pan
- Fish River Canyon
- Gamsberg
- Gibeoan Meteorites
- Hoba Meteorite
- Kalahari Desert
- Karas Mountains
- Kolmanskop
- Kuiseb Canyon
- Lake Otjikoto and Lake Guinas
- Messum
- Mount Etjo
- Mukorob
- Namib Desert
- Naukluft
- Omatako Mountains
- Organ Pipes
- Dinosaur tracks at Otjihaenamparero
- Petrified forest, Khorixas
- Sesriem Canyon
- Sossusvlei
- Tsondabvlei
- Spitzkoppe
- Twyfelfontein
- Vingerklip
- Waterberg

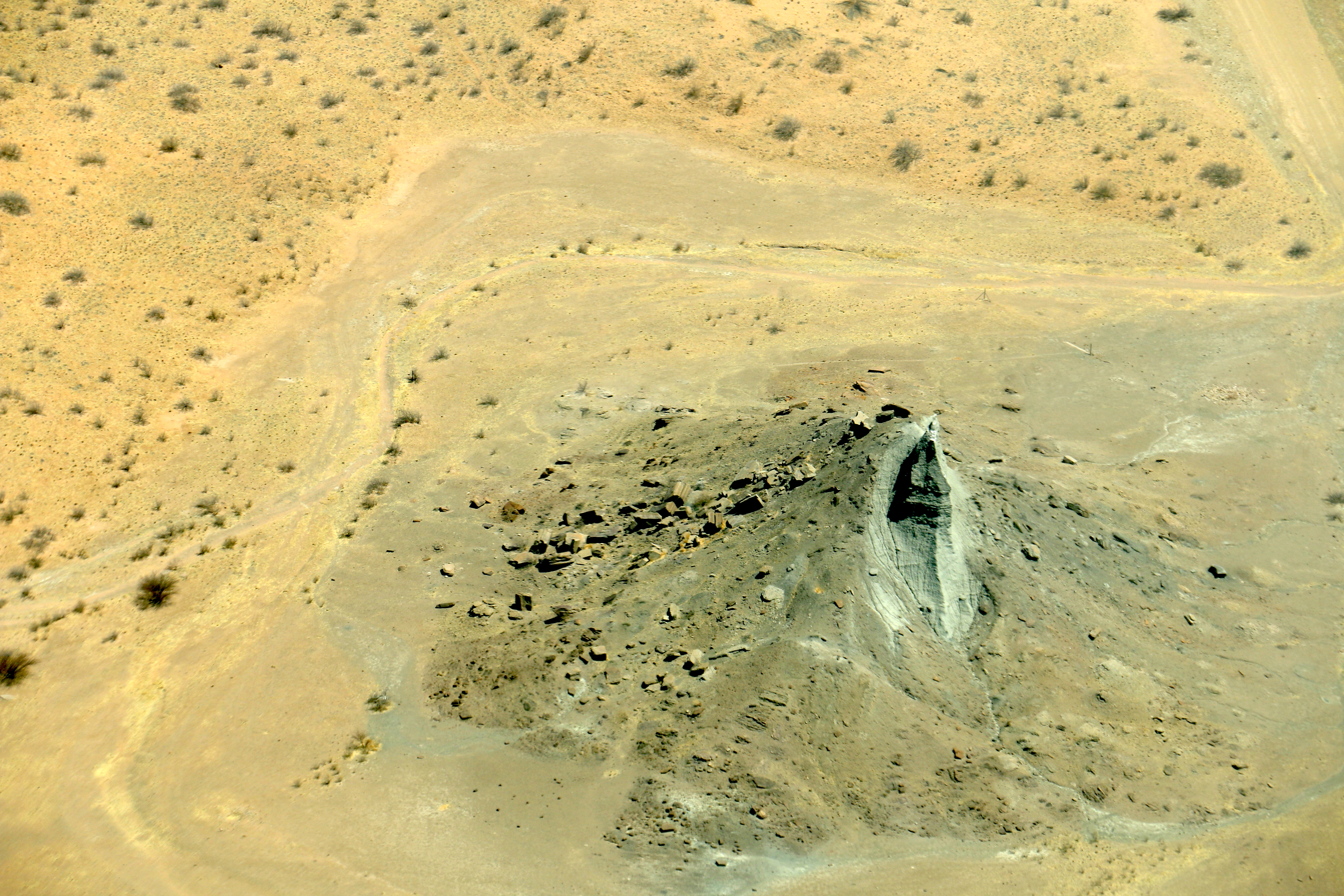
Aerial view of Mukorob, after collapse

A spoiled geological monument is the Mukorob or "Finger of God", a weather resistant remnant of a sandstone pinnacle that was left standing on its own as erosion slowly cut back the surrounding Weissrand Escarpment of the Karoo Supergroup in southern Namibia. The Mukorob consisted of a large head of sandstone supported by a narrow neck of soft, fragmented mudstone. The head was almost 12 metres (39 ft) high and weighed about 450 tonnes (440 long tons; 500 short tons). On 8 December 1988, the Mukarob collapsed, possibly due to a destructive earthquake that had occurred the previous day in Armenia, but which was recorded strongly on the seismograph in Windhoek.

The petrified forest near Khorixas in northwest Namibia is an impressive paleontological monument, which may serve as an already well protected geological site. Similarly, the Hoba Meteorite in northern Namibia, which is the largest known iron meteorite on Earth, is well protected as a national monument and attracts many visitors at the site and in the museum. The famous copper deposit at Tsumeb in northern Namibia was closed as a mine in 1996, but in addition to commercial sales of blister copper, Tsumeb is noted for its mineralogical diversity, having provided innumerable specimens of unique or rare minerals to the world's museums. Tsumeb therefore also deserves to achieve the status of a geosite. Other locations in Namibia that are of geological significance include traces of Triassic dinosauromorpha at Otjihaenamparero in central Namibia; the Fish River Canyon in southern Namibia is the second largest canyon of the world and is famous for its scenic beauty.

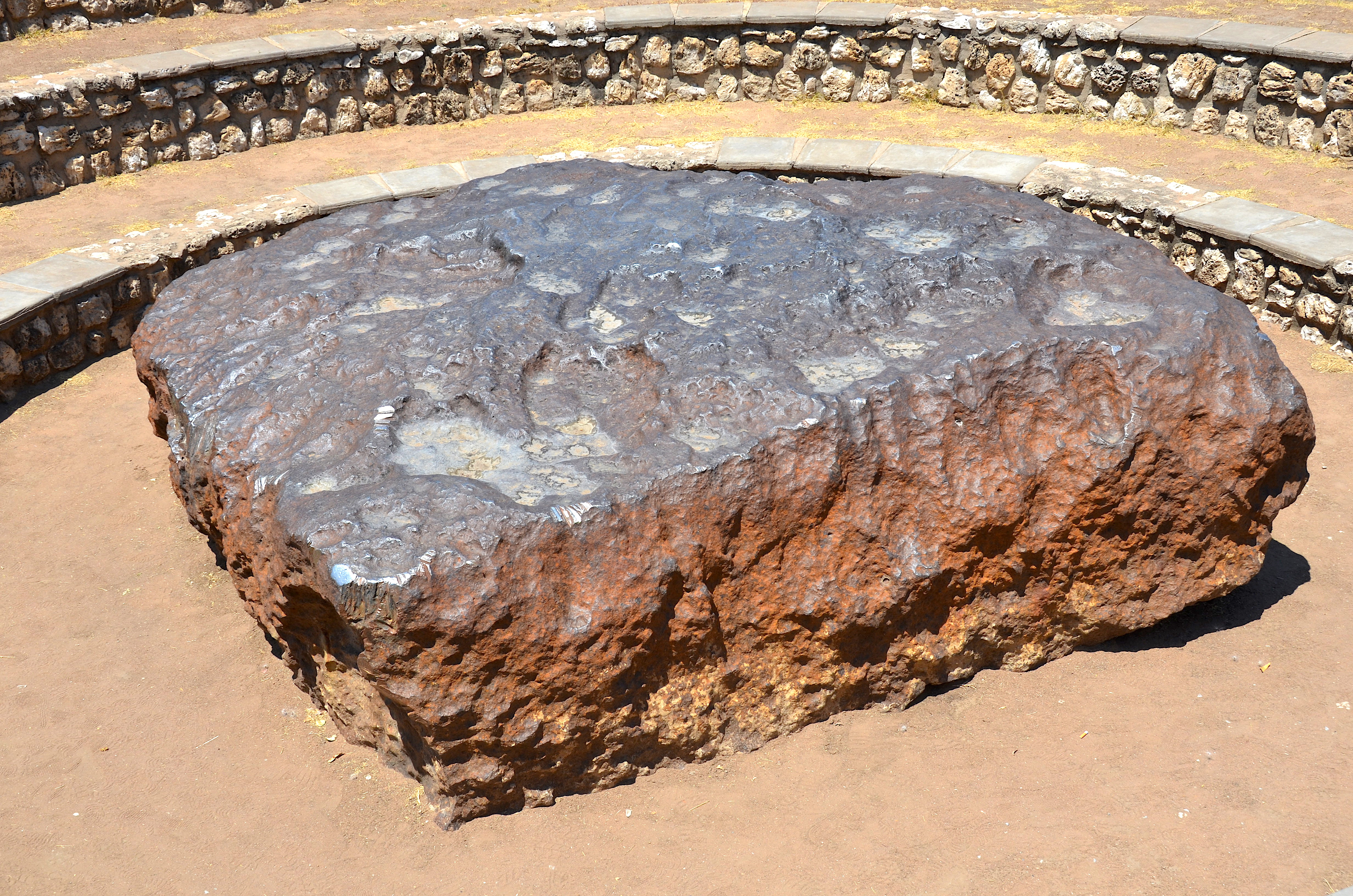
Hoba meteorite, the largest known intact meteorite

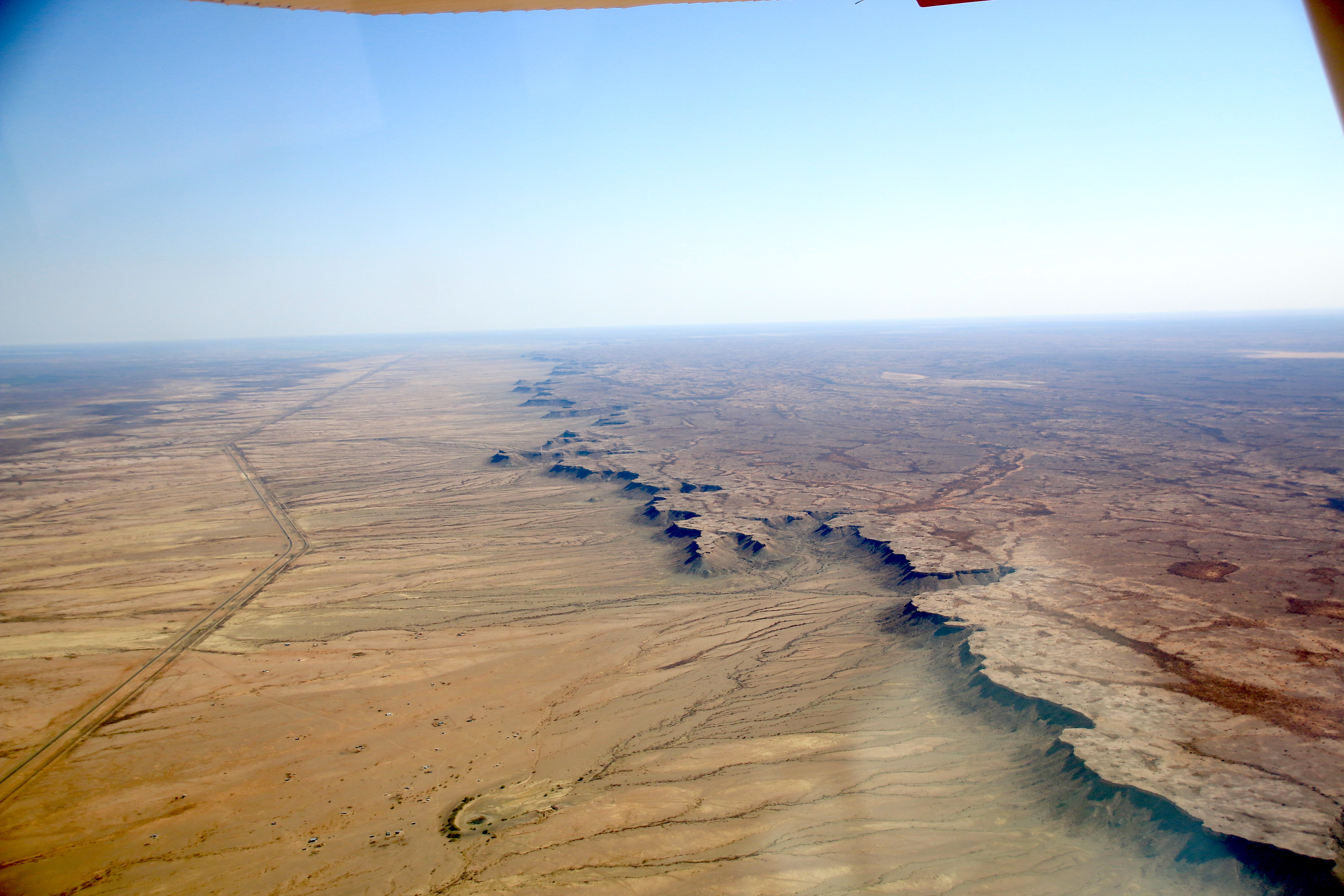
Aerial view of Weissrand (2019)

== See also ==
- Geology of Angola
- Geology of Botswana
- Geology of South Africa
