= Omingonde Formation =

Permian–Triassic geological formation in Namibia

- Stratigraphic range: ~Late Permian (Wuchiapingian)– Middle Triassic (Ladinian)
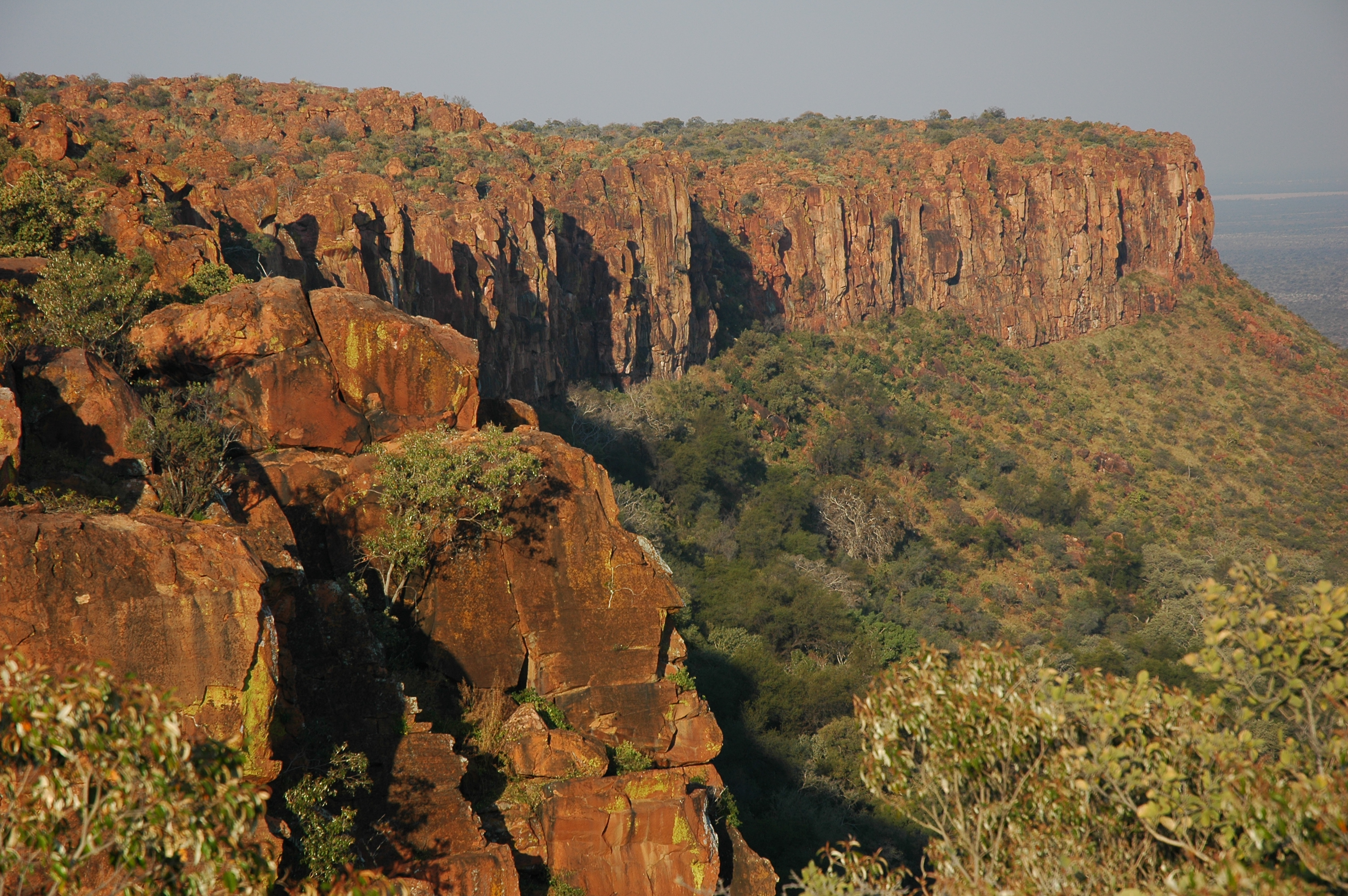
- Waterberg Plateau in Namibia
- Type: Geological formation
- Unit of: Endothiodon AZ–Cynognathus AZ; (Karoo Supergroup)
- Sub-units: Lower, middle, upper
- Underlies: Etjo Sandstone
- Overlies: Damara basement
- Thickness: 600 m (2,000 ft)

Lithology
- Primary: Sandstone, siltstone
- Other: Shale, conglomerate

Location
- Location: Damaraland
- Coordinates: 21.1°S 16.5°E
- Approximate paleocoordinates: 53.6°S 11.7°W
- Region: Erongo & Otjozondjupa Regions
- Country: Namibia
- Extent: Waterberg Basin

Type section
- Named for: Omingonde water well
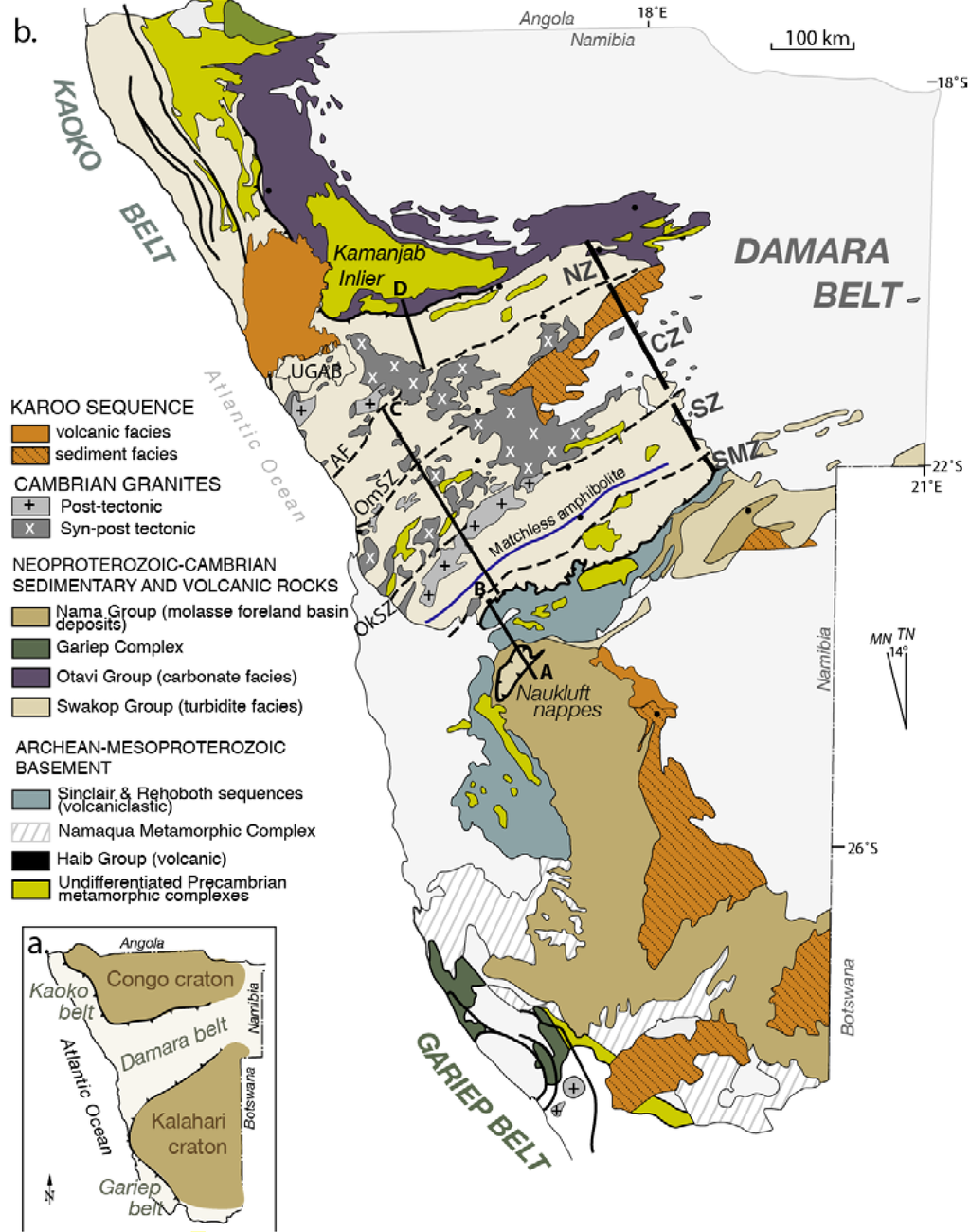
- Geologic map of Namibia with the Omingonde Formation partly cropping out in the north-central area (orange)

The Omingonde Formation is a Late Permian (Wuchiapingian) to Middle Triassic (Ladinian) geologic formation, part of the Karoo Supergroup, in the western Otjozondjupa Region and northeastern Erongo Region of north-central Namibia. The formation has a maximum thickness of about 600 metres (2,000 ft) and comprises sandstones, shales, siltstones and conglomerates, was deposited in a fluvial environment, alternating between a meandering and braided river setting.

The Omingonde Formation is correlated with a series of formations in northwestern Argentina and the Paraná Basin in southeastern Brazil, deposited in a larger basinal area, 120 million years before the break-up of Pangea. The lower part of the formation has yielded fossils of a gorgonopsian and dicynodont, and can be assigned to the upper part of the Endothiodon Assemblage Zone. The upper part of the formation has provided fossils of several therapsids, amphibians, and ichnofossils and belongs to the Cynognathus Assemblage Zone. The Omingonde Formation preserves the most diverse fauna of Middle Triassic cynodonts in the world.

== Description ==
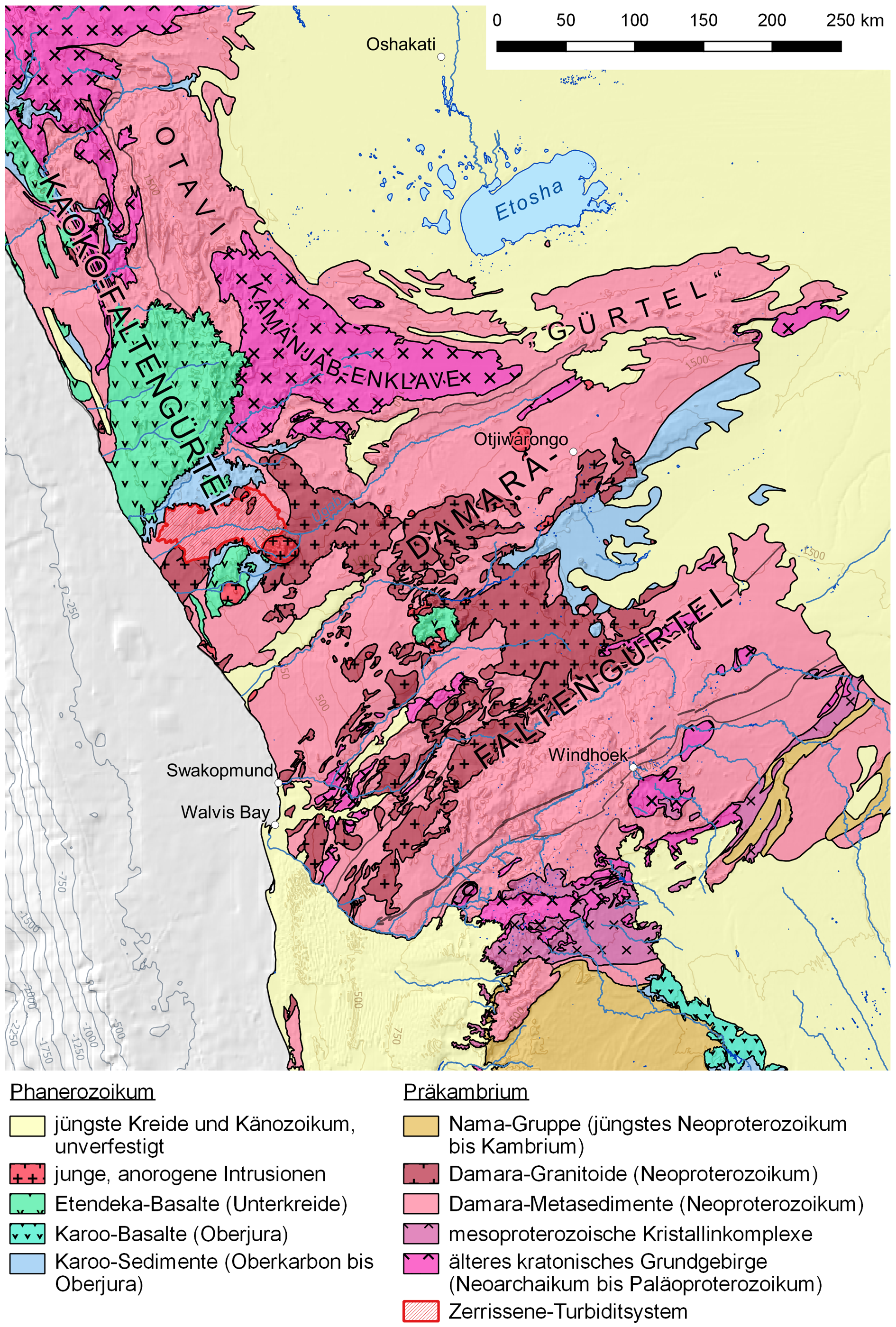
The fault-bound Waterberg Basin is shown in light blue

The Omingonde Formation is named after a water well in Mount Etjo, Namibia. The formation is a lithological unit with an approximate maximum thickness of 600 metres (2,000 ft), deposited in the Waterberg Basin where it overlies the Damara basement, and is unconformably overlain by the Early Jurassic Etjo Sandstone. The formation is widespread in the Otjiwarongo, Grootfontein and Omaruru Districts. Main outcrops are south of the Waterberg thrust near Mount Etjo, Omatakos and north of the Waterberg Plateau.

The Omingonde Formation splits naturally into four units, each comprising several upward-fining cycles reflecting distinct architectural characteristics. The lower two units coincide with the Lower and Middle Omingonde Formation, the upper two units make up the Upper Omingonde Formation. Thicknesses and architectural style of the units vary laterally and are influenced by syn-sedimentary tectonic activity of the Waterberg-Omaruru Lineament. The full range of facies is best developed in the Mt. Waterberg area, whereas farther west in the Erongo Region more proximal facies are favored. This proximal facies association has been termed the Krantzberg Formation in the western, northern and eastern Erongo area, and interfingers with the Lions Head Formation towards the southeastern Erongo Region. North of the Ameib Line, which is part of the Waterberg-Omaruru Fault zone, no rocks of Karoo age are preserved until the Otjongundu Basin, which hosts a 350 metres (1,150 ft) thick conglomeratic red-bed sequence that probably correlates with the Omingonde Formation.

The formation comprises red and white colored clastics including conglomerates, sandstones and siltstones. Many units are channelized and show paleosol development. Three major facies are developed in the lower unit, including channelized, trough cross-bedded conglomerates, followed by sandy mudstones, which are interbedded with more massive, pebbly mudstones. The conglomerates are matrix-supported and grade vertically and laterally into sandstones. Their clasts derived dominantly from metasedimentary and granitic rocks. The channels are usually well confined and amalgamation occurs rarely. The sandy mudstones are reddish in colour, they contain lenticular interbeds of fine grained sandstones. They are characterised by a climbing-ripple lamination. Furthermore, the mudstones contain thin interlayers of blocky calcrete and carbonate nodules with some rhizoliths. Massive pebbly mudstones are restricted to positions very proximal to the Waterberg-Omaruru Fault. They are characterised by a massive matrix-supported texture and a low structural and compositional maturity of both, matrix and clasts.

The Upper Omingonde Formation is best developed in the Mt. Waterberg area, but no occurrences have been found in the Goboboseb-Otjongundu region. The succession begins with a laterally amalgamated channel facies alternating with a sandy mudstone facies. In the lower units, the channel bodies are 80 to 150 metres (260 to 490 ft) wide and the degree of lateral amalgamation is similar to the Middle Omingonde Formation, but vertical stacking is less pronounced and decreases systematically upwards. In the upper part of the formation, channels are isolated and only a few meters wide. Up-section, the maturity of channel fills successively increases until well rounded medium to coarse grained sandstones dominate. The architecture remains cyclic with the channel facies alternating with laminated fine grained sandstones and bioturbated mudstones.

=== Depositional environment ===
The Omingonde Formation comprises chiefly braided fluvial deposits, which record semi-arid climatic conditions prevailing until the Upper Omingonde Formation. The latter marks a temporary shift to a wetter climate until semi-arid conditions re-established with the succeeding Etjo Formation. The degree of channel amalgamation and palaeosol development corresponds with sediment discharge rates: More confined meandering channels and extensive palaeosol developments are associated with lower discharge rates rather than amalgamated braided channel systems.

The channel geometries and the low degree of amalgamation in the Lower Omingonde Formation indicate an overall meandering river system. Sandy mudstones were generated during crevasse splays and associated flood stages. Intervals of non-deposition are indicated by immature paleosols, which are represented by scarce rhizoliths and blocky calcretes. In proximal positions to the Waterberg-Omaruru Fault pebbly mudstone units reveal mud flow deposits related to an enhanced fault generated relief.

The Middle Omingonde Formation has been interpreted as a mobile braided stream system due to the well developed trough cross-bedding and upward-fining character of poorly confined channel bodies, together with their sheet-like appearance and ubiquitous vertical and lateral amalgamation. In addition, significant vertical accretion is indicated by the preservation of overbank fines, that abundantly show pedogenic modification. The proximal deposits of the Erongo area show textural and grain size characteristics of debris flows that amalgamated to form fault-bounded alluvial fan aprons. These fans give evidence for persistent syn-sedimentary activity of the Waterberg Fault system. The Upper Omingonde Formation reflects a progressive change from a braided river system to a more meandering river system with decreasing discharge rates. Temporarily wetter climates are indicated by bioturbated mudstones, that formed in seasonal lakes. Although a hiatus to the overlying Etjo Formation is proposed, the facies of the Upper Omingonde Formation represents a transitional stage to the facies of the Lower Etjo Formation.

The syn-sedimentary tectonic control on Omingonde deposition is recorded by both thickening of strata towards the Waterberg-Omaruru Fault and by the pronounced shift of the adjacent depocenter, the latter suggesting left-lateral oblique slip movement.

=== Fossil content ===
Most of the formation belongs to the Triassic Cynognathus Assemblage Zone as identified by Keyser in 1973; and preserves the most diverse fauna of Middle Triassic cynodonts in the world; the formation is a biostratigraphic link among Middle Triassic faunas from South Africa, Tanzania (Manda Formation), Zambia, Argentina, Brazil, and Antarctica. The cynodonts of the Triassic era are important markers to correlate terrestrial formations. Trirachodon fossils have also been found in the Driekoppen Formation of South Africa.

Fieldwork conducted in 2019, resulting from repatriated fossils collected in 1996 from the Omingonde Formation, revealed that the lowest part of the formation belongs to the late Permian Endothiodon Assemblage Zone. Fossils of these strata include the skulls of two therapsids: a gorgonopsian (cf. Lycaenops) and a dicynodont (cf. Tropidostoma). These finds indicate that additional research is needed to better understand the relationship between the upper and lower parts of the formation, particularly the presence of an unconformity between the two preserved assemblage zones.

The following fossils have been reported from the upper (Triassic, Cynognathus AZ) parts of the formation:

Amphibians

- Mastodonsauridae indet.

Reptiles

- Etjosuchus recurvidens

Therapsids

Name	Image	Notes
Chiniquodon omaruruensis		
Diademodon tetragonus		
Dolichuranus primaevus		
Rhopalorhinus etionensis (synonym)
Etjoia dentitransitus		
Herpetogale marsupialis		
Kannemeyeria lophorhinus		
Titanogomphodon crassus		
Trirachodon berryi		
Aleodon sp.		
Cynognathus sp.		
Luangwa sp.		
Traversodontidae indet.		

Ichnofossils

- Saurichnium anserinum, S. damarense, S. parallelum, S. tetractis
- Tetrapodium elmenhorsti

=== Correlations ===
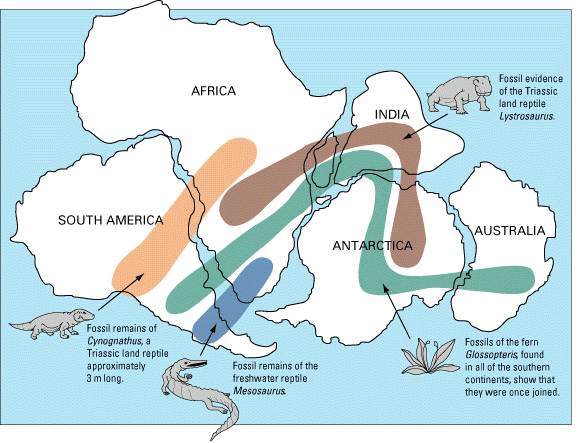
Cynognathus (orange) is an important trace fossil for the Triassic of Gondwana

The formation is correlated with the lower part of the Santa Maria Formation of the Paraná Basin in Rio Grande do Sul, Brazil. The Chañares Formation of the Ischigualasto-Villa Unión Basin in northwestern Argentina is also time-equivalent with the Omingonde Formation, and similar fauna assemblages as the Omingonde Formation have been reported from the Río Seco de la Quebrada Formation of Argentina. In the Karoo Basin of southern Namibia and the Eastern, Northern and Western Cape, South Africa, the formation is time-equivalent with the Burgersdorp and Elliot Formation. In Antarctica, the formation correlates with the Fremouw Formation.

== See also ==
- List of fossiliferous stratigraphic units in Namibia
- Geology of Namibia
- Angwa Sandstone
- Beaufort Group
- Huab Formation
- Gondwanide orogeny
