= Etjo Sandstone =

Geologic formation in Namibia

- Stratigraphic range: Early Jurassic
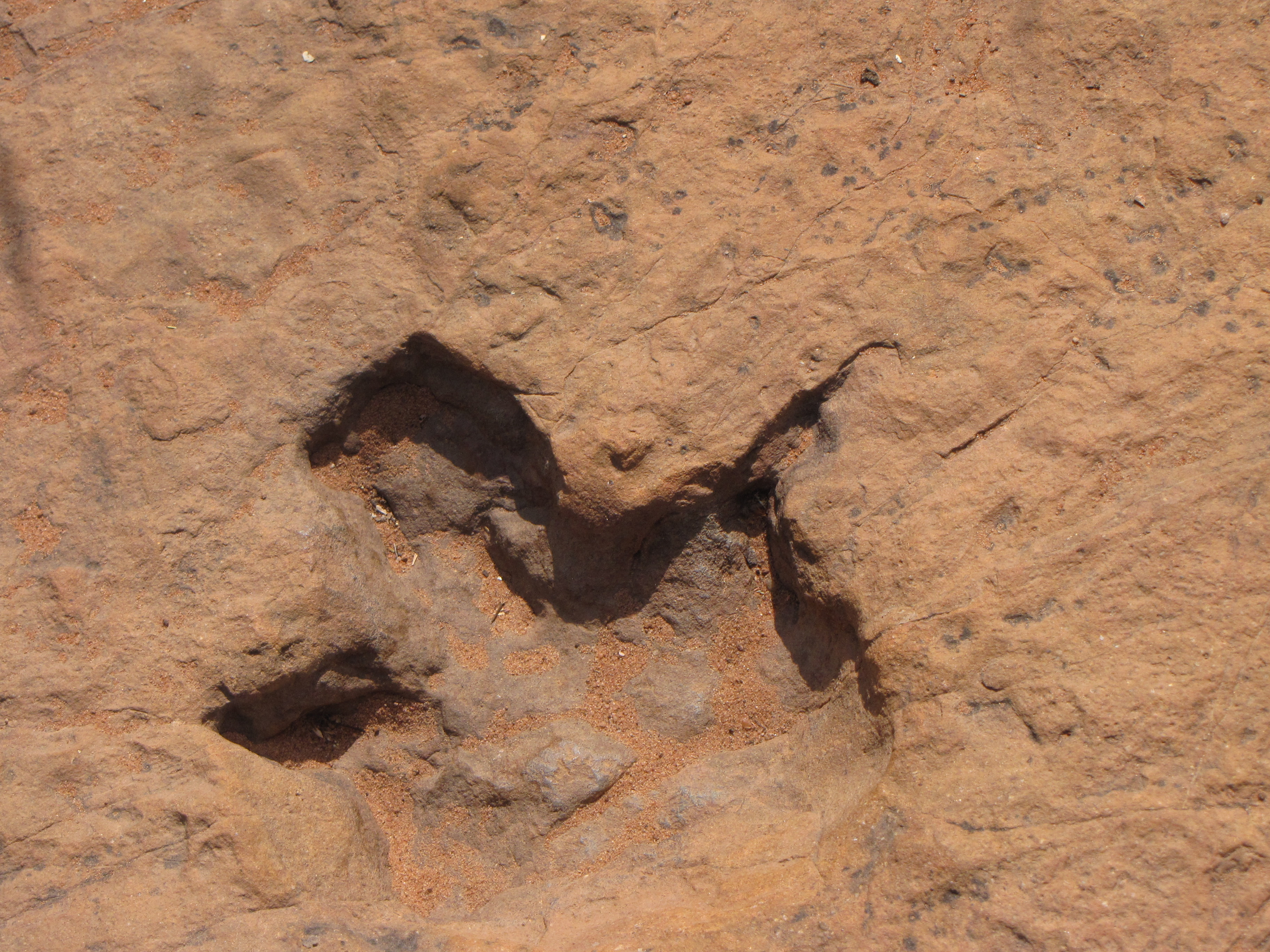
- Dinosaur trace fossil in the Etjo Sandstone
- Type: Geological formation
- Unit of: Etendeka Group
- Overlies: Omingonde Fm. (Waterberg Basin); Doros or Gai-As Formation (Huab Basin)
- Thickness: 140 m (460 ft)

Lithology
- Primary: Sandstone

Location
- Location: Damaraland
- Coordinates: 21.4°S 16.7°E
- Approximate paleocoordinates: 30.2°S 8.8°W
- Region: Kunene & Erongo Regions
- Country: Namibia
- Extent: Waterberg Basin; Huab Basin
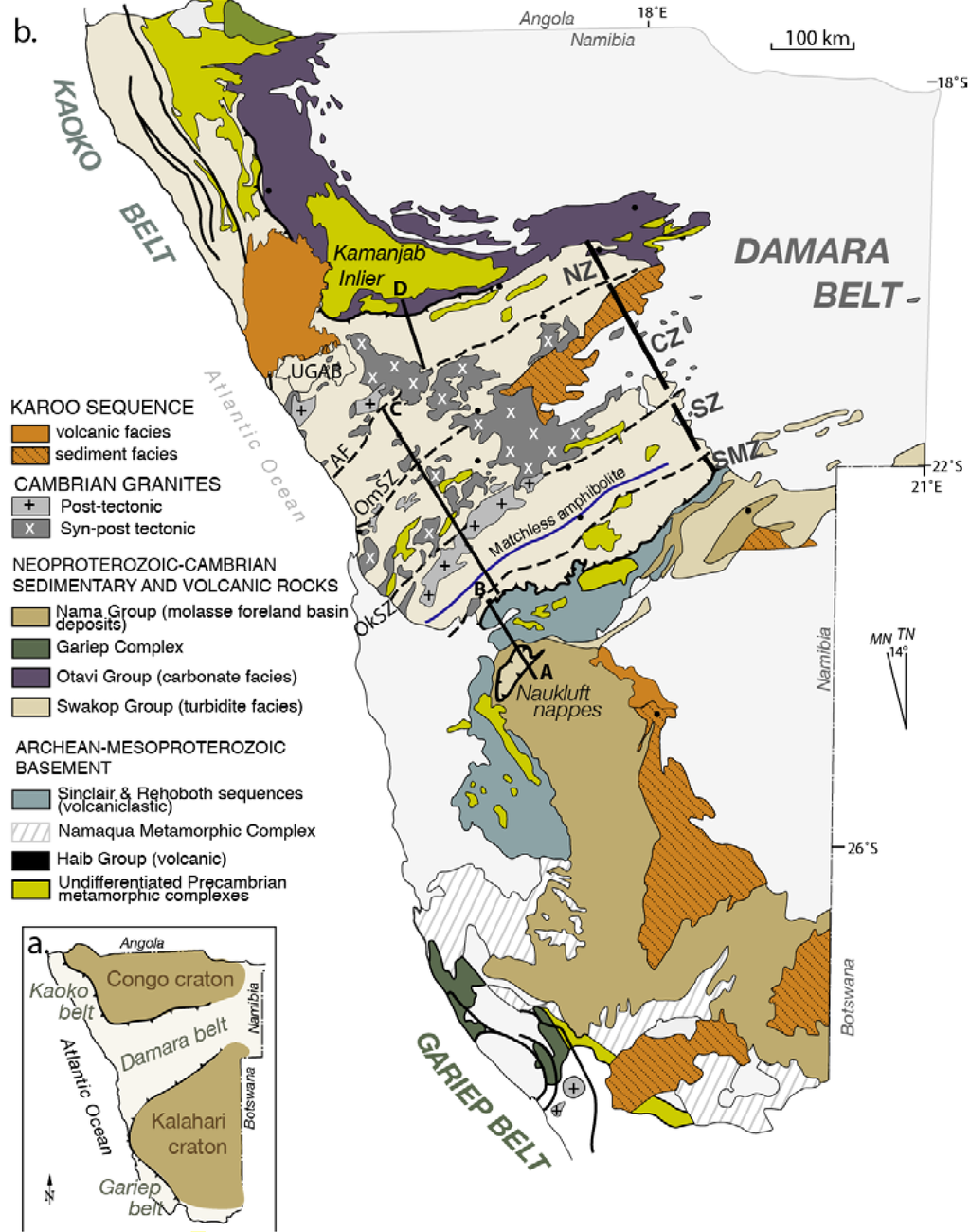
- Geologic map of Namibia with the Etjo Sandstone partly cropping out in the northwestern area (orange)

The Etjo Sandstone is an Early Jurassic geologic formation in northern Namibia. The formation overlies the Omingonde Formation in the Waterberg Basin and the Doros and Gai-As Formations in the Huab Basin and has a total thickness of 140 metres (460 ft). Fossil theropod tracks of Prosauropoda indet., Theropoda indet., Tetrapodium elmenhorsti, Saurichnium anserinum, S. damarense, S. parallelum and S. tetractis have been reported from the formation, deposited in an aeolian environment.

== See also ==
- List of dinosaur-bearing rock formations
  - List of stratigraphic units with theropod tracks
- List of fossiliferous stratigraphic units in Namibia
- Geology of Namibia
