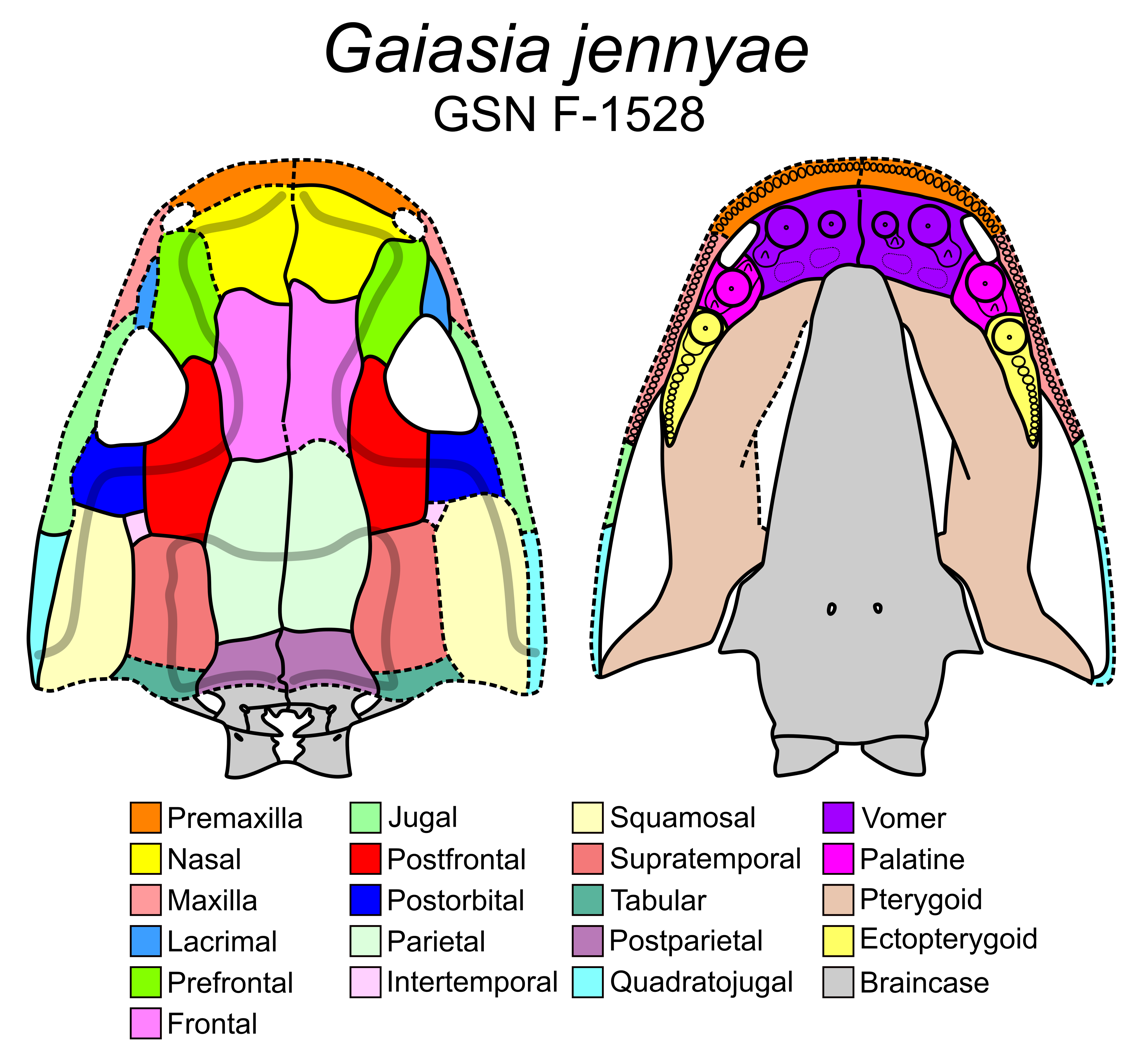
- Skull diagram

Scientific classification
- Domain: Eukaryota
- Kingdom: Animalia
- Phylum: Chordata
- Clade: Sarcopterygii
- Clade: Tetrapodomorpha
- Clade: Stegocephali
- Genus: †Gaiasia; Marsicano et al., 2024
- Species: †G. jennyae

Binomial name
- †Gaiasia jennyae Marsicano et al., 2024

= Gaiasia =

Gaiasia Temporal range: Early Permian, ~280 Ma

Extinct genus of tetrapodomorphs

Gaiasia is an extinct genus of stem-tetrapods from the Early Permian of Namibia, containing a single species, Gaiasia jennyae. Gaiasia was a freshwater predator which was exceptional among stem-tetrapods for its combination of relatively enormous size, Southern occurrence, and late survival.

Gaiasia is known from three fossil specimens, including an incomplete skeleton with a crushed skull and partial vertebral column. Though limb material is not preserved, the skull of Gaiasia indicates that its affinities lie with digit-bearing stem-tetrapods (early amphibians, in the broad sense). It was a close relative to the colosteids, a family of aquatic stem-tetrapods with long bodies and small limbs. Most digit-bearing stem-tetrapods, including the colosteids, go extinct by the Carboniferous rainforest collapse near the end of the preceding Carboniferous Period. Gaiasia is one of the few to survive into the Permian alongside crown-tetrapods (the groups directly ancestral to living amphibians, mammals, and reptiles).

Gaiasia is the largest known digit-bearing stem-tetrapods, with an estimated maximum skull length reaching 60 centimetres (24 in). It was found in the Gai-As Formation, a rock unit corresponding to cold temperate lake environments located near the South Pole (around 55° South) in the Permian. Other digit-bearing stem tetrapods were significantly smaller (skulls under 40 centimetres (16 in) in length), and nearly all were restricted to the tropics of Euramerica, a low-latitude region equivalent to present-day Europe and North America. Gaiasia hints that stem-tetrapods in Southern latitudes continued to persist and evolve through the Late Paleozoic icehouse interval, even as low-latitude species died out and were supplanted by crown-tetrapods. Gaiasia's genus name references the Gai-As Formation, while the species name honors the late Jenny Clack, an expert in early tetrapods.

== Description ==
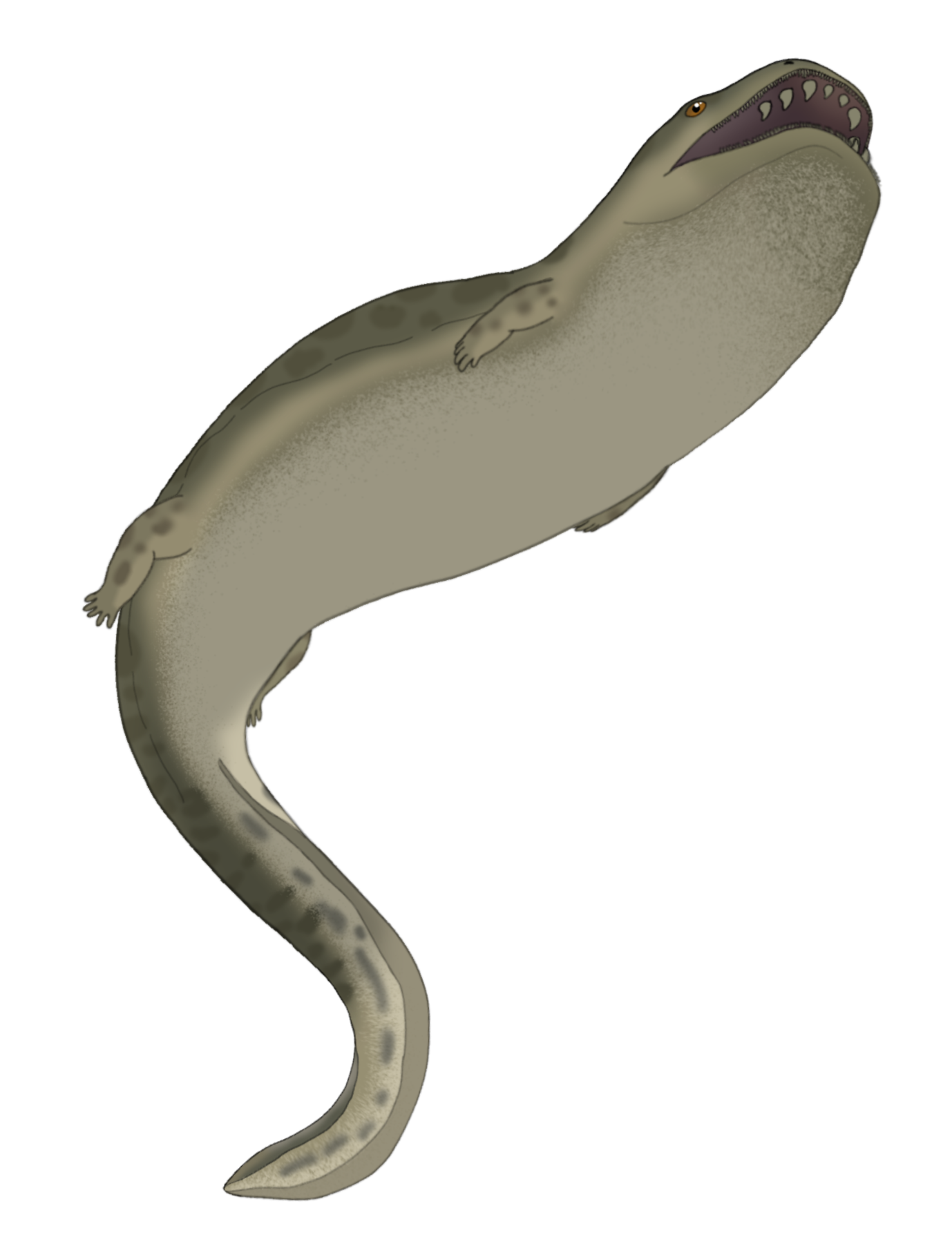
Speculative life restoration

Gaiasia has a broad flattened skull, large keeled branchial elements (throat or gill bones), a reinforced neck, and massive interlocking fangs at the front of the snout. Together these traits indicate that it was well-adapted for both suction feeding and a strong bite. The front edge of the snout is not fully preserved, but the profile of the skull shows that the snout is short and boxy. The bones of the skull roof are thin and ornamented by radiating ridges and grooves. A pineal foramen is absent, but lateral line canals are well-developed and a small intertemporal bone is present. Most unique features relate to the palate (roof of the mouth). The parasphenoid bone (which forms the floor of the braincase) is large and wide, with a blunt front tip, but the interpterygoid vacuities (large holes which flank the parasphenoid) are narrow. The paired bones at the front of the palate have large fangs: two fangs on each vomer, one per palatine, and one per ectopterygoid. Each fang is paired with a large pit which hosts developing replacement teeth.

The lower jaw is rather thin and smoothly curved at the front, but thickens further back and extends past the jaw joint. Several fangs occur at the front of the lower jaw, with three on each side (six in total). Two of the three fangs are adjacent to the symphysis (the point where the two sides of the jaw converge at the middle). These two fangs are hosted by the adsymphyseal and dentary bones. The largest fang is located a bit further back, on an enlarged first coronoid bone which swells inwards from the rim of the jaw. The neck joint is a strong hinge, formed from the contact between a pair of exoccipital condyles (rounded surfaces on the braincase) and a partially fused atlas-axis complex (the first few neck vertebrae). Paired exoccipital condyles have convergently evolved in a number of crown-tetrapod lineages (lissamphibians, stereospondyls, some "lepospondyls", and mammals), none of which are related to Gaiasia. On the edge of the braincase, a spur of bone divides the spiracular cleft (a hole which hosted the spiracle or ear canal) from the depressor mandibulae fossa (a pocket for the muscles which open the mouth).

The vertebrae of Gaiasia are diplospondylous. This means that each vertebra has three components: a two-part centrum with a spool-shaped intercentrum and pleurocentrum, plus a stout neural spine at the top. The ribs are large, curved, and strongly attached to their corresponding vertebra on thick pedicels. Fossils of the limbs, shoulder, or hip are completely unknown in Gaiasia. The limbs may have been completely absent (akin to stem-tetrapods such as aistopods and adelospondyls) or merely small (akin to stem-tetrapods such as colosteids and Crassigyrinus). The original description did not attempt to estimate the total body length, as much of the skeleton is incomplete. News articles publicizing the discovery suggest it could have reached a length of 2.5 metres (8.2 ft) to 4 metres (13 ft).
