= Tetrapodium =

Tetrapodium Temporal range: Middle Triassic–Early Jurassic

Trace fossil classification
- Ichnogenus: †Tetrapodium; Gürich, 1926

Tetrapodium is an ichnogenus of fossil footprints found in the Etjo Sandstone and Omingonde Formations (Tetrapodium elmenhorsti) of Namibia. The Etjo Sandstone fossils were initially identified as rounded, featureless depressions presumed to have been made by a quadrupedal animal, but more recent examination in 2016 could not identify such tracks and concluded they are most likely non-biogenic features of the rock surface.

== See also ==
- List of dinosaur ichnogenera
