= Gai-As Formation =

Geologic formation in Namibia

- Stratigraphic range: Kungurian-Wordian; ~272–265 Ma
- Type: Geological formation
- Unit of: "Ecca" Group
- Sub-units: Upper, lower
- Underlies: Etjo Sandstone or Doros Formation
- Overlies: Huab Formation
- Thickness: 70 m (230 ft)

Lithology
- Primary: Sandstone, siltstone, mudstone
- Other: Tuff, chert, halite

Location
- Location: Damaraland
- Coordinates: 20.8°S 14.1°E
- Approximate paleocoordinates: 49.1°S 22.6°W
- Region: Kunene & Erongo Regions
- Country: Namibia
- Extent: Huab Basin

Type section
- Named for: Gai-As
- Named by: Horsthemke 1992 (original); Stanistreet & Stollhofen 1999 (redefined)
- Location: Gai-As
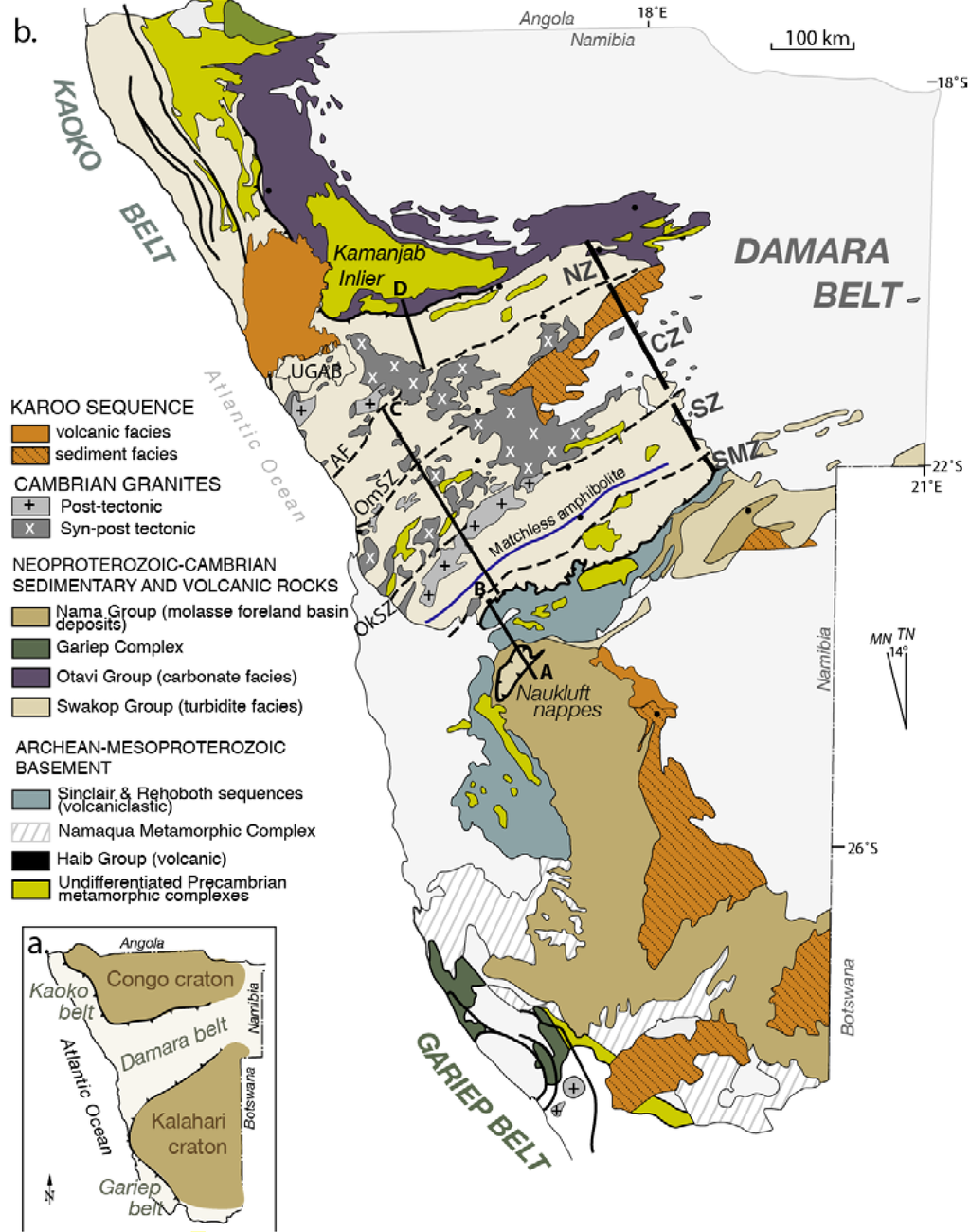
- Geologic map of Namibia with the Gai-As Formation partly cropping out in the northwestern area (orange)

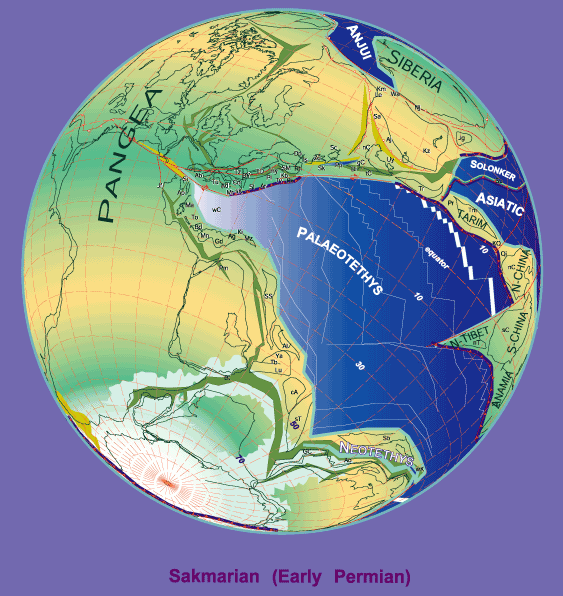
Early Permian (280 Ma)

The Gai-As Formation is an Early to Middle Permian (Kungurian to Wordian) geologic formation correlated with the Ecca Group and designated "Ecca" Group, because it does not belong to the Karoo, in the southwestern Kunene Region and northern Erongo Region of northwestern Namibia. The Gai-As Formation represents the second-oldest sedimentary unit of the Huab Basin, overlying the Huab Formation. The formation was deposited in a fluvial to lacustrine setting.

The Gai-As Formation is correlated with a series of formations in the Pelotas and Paraná Basins in southeastern Brazil, deposited in a larger basinal area, 150 million years before the break-up of Pangea. The abundance of Glossopteris and Mesosaurus fossils in the underlying Huab Formation are characteristic of the Gondwanan correlation across present-day South America, Africa, Antarctica and Australia. The Gai-As Formation has provided fossil bivalves and an indeterminate stereospondylid.

== Description ==
The Gai-As Formation is named after the ruins of a colonial German police station located at a spring in the central Huab area. The formation is a lithological unit with an approximate maximum thickness of 70 metres (230 ft), deposited in the Huab Basin where it overlies the Huab Formation, separated by a significant hiatus, and is unconformably overlain by the Etjo Sandstone, while later authors assign a separate formation to the upper 35 metres (115 ft) of the Gai-As Formation, named Doros Formation. The formation comprises sandstones, siltstones and mudstones deposited in a lacustrine environment. U/Pb SHRIMP dating of zircons from two of several fallout tuff beds in the Gai-As Formation 14 metres (46 ft) above the stereospondyl find gave weighted mean values of 272 ± 1.8 Ma and 265 ± 2.5 Ma.

The Gai-As Formation is the most widespread depositional unit within the Huab Basin. The approximately 70 metres (230 ft) thick succession is easily distinguished from all the other units by its characteristic reddish to violet color. The Gai-As Formation gradationally overlies the lacustrine deposits of the Huab Formation in the western part of the basin, but in the east succeeds the fluvial deposits of the Huab Formation with a sharp contact. The basal beds of the formation are ubiquitously represented by fine-grained distal deposits and imply a much larger extent of the formation due to the absence of sediments from marginal environments.

The lower part of the succession is formed by approximately 50 metres (160 ft) of thick reddish-violet, slightly calcareous shales. In the lower half of this mainly pelitic succession, intercalations of dark brown, very often concretionary calcareous layers up to 1 metre (3.3 ft) thick, occur. These layers contain siltstone beds which locally exhibit flaser bedding, oscillation ripples and hummocky cross-bedding. The calcareous layers also contain small fossiliferous lenses with fishbones. The upper half of the basal shaly section contains a few layers, 10 to 20 centimetres (3.9 to 7.9 in) thick, which are whitish and analcime-rich and occasionally thin layers of green chert.

The basal beds grade into a 20 metres (66 ft) thick succession of silty to fine-grained, and eventually medium- to coarse grained, sandstone. Sections of the uppermost part show various types of intercalations: silt- and sandstone layers grade laterally into sequences of interbedded shale and sandstone with occasional intercalations of stromatolitic layers, carbonate horizons with molluscs, bone beds of fish scales and white layers rich in authigenic feldspar. The shale frequently exhibits desiccation cracks, whereas root marks are abundant in sandstone. Halite crystal moulds have been found locally. The white tuff layers within the Gai-As Formation contain very well-preserved former glass shards, now mainly replaced by barite, are rich in potassium feldspar and have a porcelain-like appearance.

=== Depositional environment ===
The Gai-As Formation as a whole displays an upward coarsening sequence which starts with distal shallow lacustrine shales. The occurrence of flaser bedding, oscillation ripples and hummocky cross-stratification in silty intercalations indicates that the sediment, surface must have been above the storm wave base. The remarkably high content of analcime (30 volume percent) in some layers may be indicative of contemporaneous volcanic activity. Early diagenetic formation of analcime from volcanic glass in an alkaline environment has been described. High alkalinity of the lake water may also have been the reason for the almost complete lack of fossils in this part of the section. The overlying succession of sandstones, siltstones, stromatolites and emerged horizons reflects the upward shallowing of the formation. Besides extensive sand flats, large playas, several square kilometres in size, must have existed during the final stages of deposition. The playa deposits are represented by shaly sediments with intercalated feldspar-rich layers (2 to 4 centimetres (0.79 to 1.57 in)), stromatolite horizons (5 to 15 centimetres (2.0 to 5.9 in)) and fish scale bone beds (3 to 5 centimetres (1.2 to 2.0 in)). Fossiliferous stratiform carbonates (10 to 15 centimetres (3.9 to 5.9 in) thick) with molluscs of the Terraia altissima type are transitional to the sand-flat facies which is characterised by sandy, flat and lenticular deposits and occasionally contain abundant root marks. The lowermost part of the formation indicates a fluvio-lacustrine environment.

=== Fossil content ===
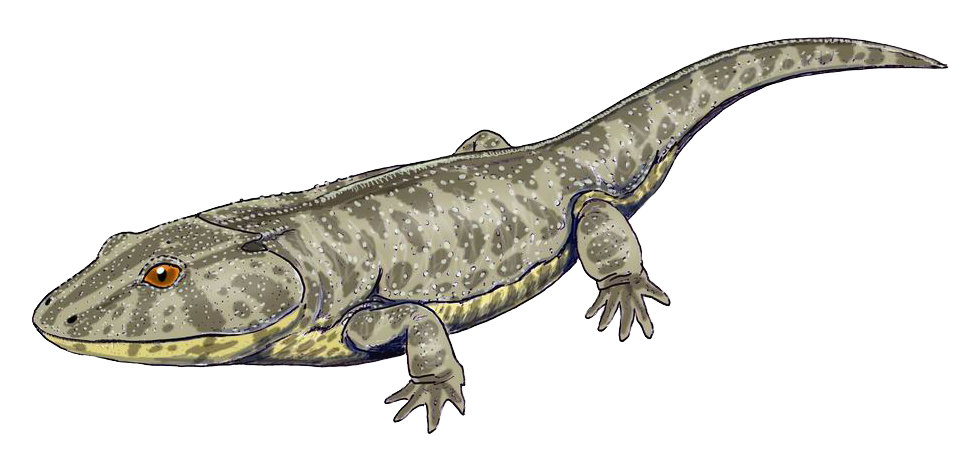
Reconstruction of a stereospondylid

The following fossils have been reported from the formation:

Amphibians

- Gaiasia jennyae
- Stereospondyli indet.

Fish

- Xenacanthida indet.
- Actinopterygii indet.

Bivalves

- Cowperesia emerita
- Huabiella compressa
- Terraia cf. altissima, T. cf. curvata

=== Correlations ===
The lower part of the formation is correlated with the Serra Alta Formation and the upper part with the Teresina Formation of the Paraná and Pelotas Basins in Rio Grande do Sul, Brazil. Due to increased subsidence in the central Paraná Basin, thicknesses of the correlative units are considerably greater than that of the Gai-As Formation, attaining a maximum of 1,200 metres (3,900 ft). In the Karoo Basin of southern Namibia and the Eastern, Northern and Western Cape, South Africa, the formation is time-equivalent with the Collingham, Ripon and Fort Brown Formations. The fossil assemblages of Glossopteris and Mesosaurus that occur in the underlying Huab Formation are known from other parts of Gondwana; the Vryheid Formation of South Africa and coal deposits of the Lower Permian in Australia.

== See also ==
- List of fossiliferous stratigraphic units in Namibia
- Geology of Namibia
- Ganigobis Formation
- Gondwanide orogeny
