= Owambo Basin =

Sedimentary basin in southern Africa

- Location of the Owambo Basin in Namibia

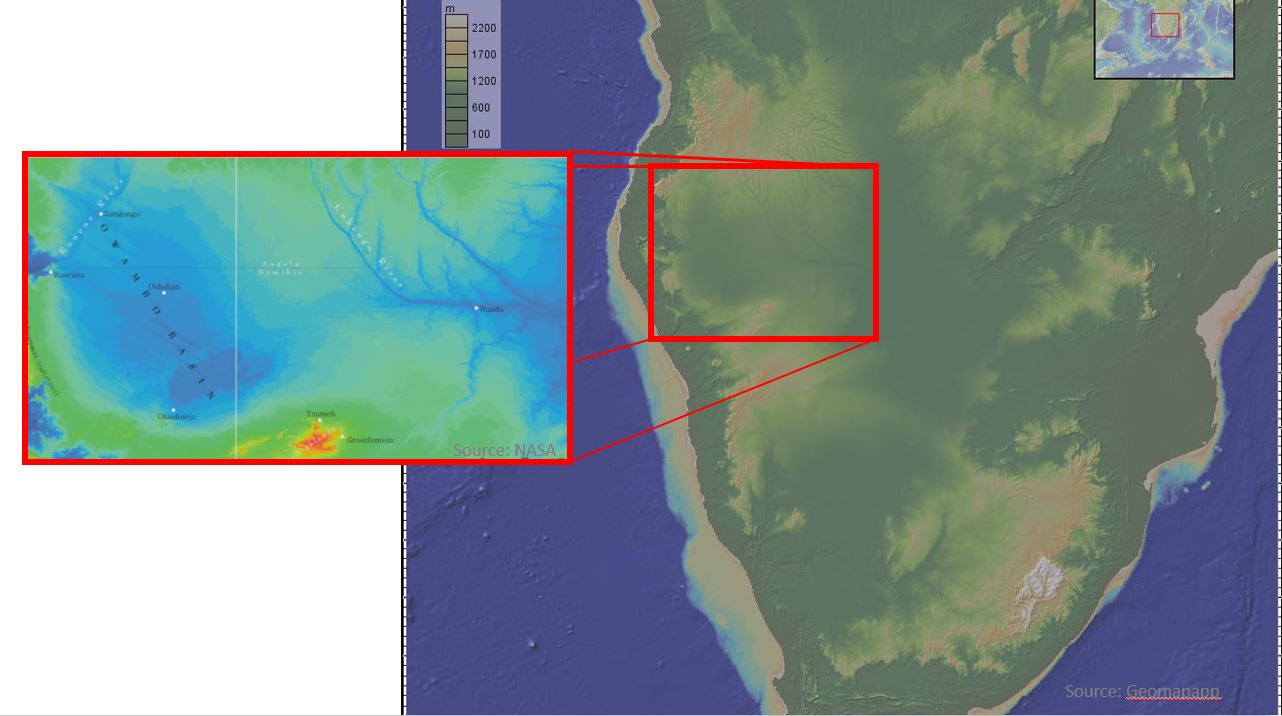
- Topographical map of the Owambo Basin

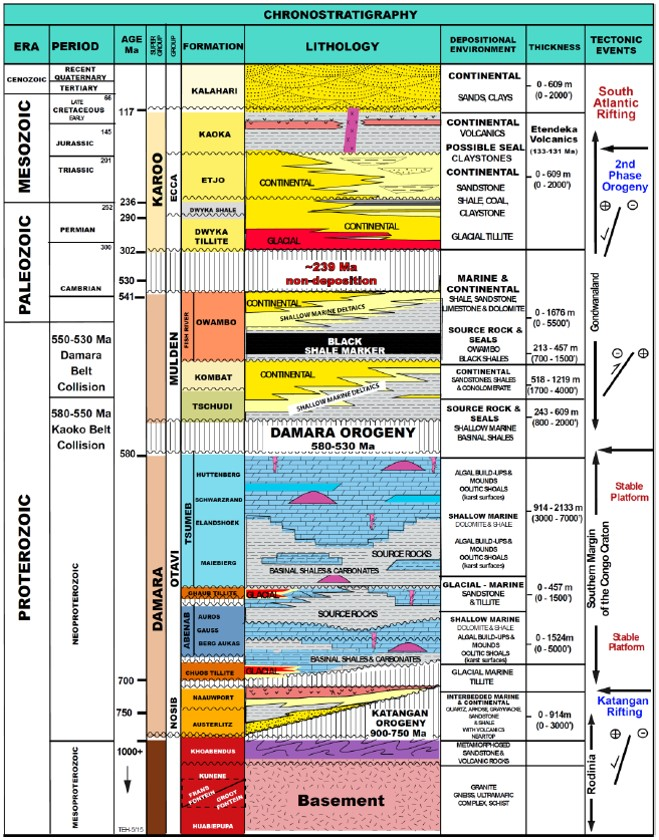
- Stratigraphic column of the Owambo Basin

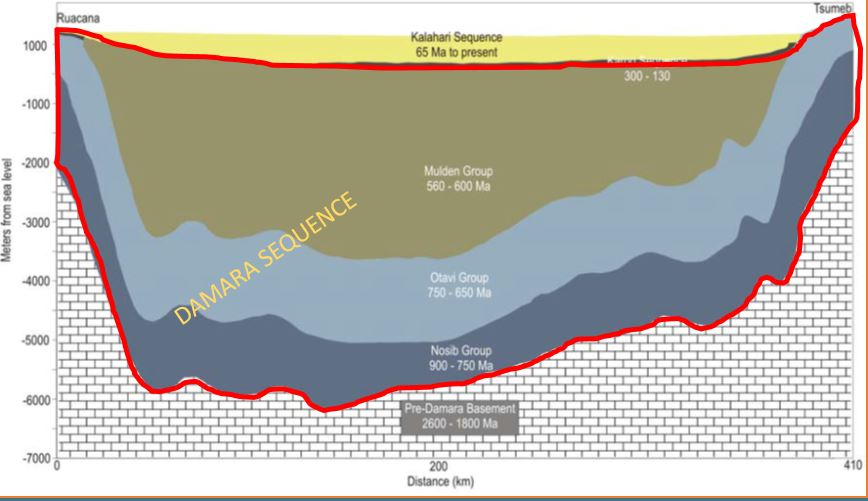
- Stratigraphic cross-section of the Owambo Basin with the Damara Sequence highlighted in red, modified from Komona et al.
- Coordinates: 18°47′07″S 16°15′50″E
- Location: Congo Craton, Southern Africa
- Region: Kalahari Desert
- Country: Angola; Namibia
- Cities: Tsumeb

Characteristics
- On/Offshore: Onshore

Geology
- Basin type: Pull-apart basin
- Plate: African
- Age: Neoproterozoic-Cretaceous
- Stratigraphy: Stratigraphy

The Owambo Basin is a sedimentary basin located on the Congo Craton in Southern Africa that extends from southern Angola into Namibia and includes the Etosha Pan. It is bound on the southern and western sides by the Damara Belt in Northern Namibia, and by the Cubango River to the East. The northern boundary is scientifically disputed, but is currently mapped by most stratigraphers to include southern Angola with the boundary set at the Kunene River. The Owambo Basin is host to two famous regions: Tsumeb, a major Namibian city and site of a formerly active copper mine with exceptional mineralogical variability producing museum quality rare specimens, and Etosha National Park, the largest protected wildlife sanctuary in Namibia centered around Etosha Pan.

== Local area ==
Provenances/Regions that are included in the Owambo Basin are:

=== Namibia ===
- Kunene
- Osmusati
- Oshana
- Ohangwena
- Oshikoto
- Kavango West
- Kavango East
- Otjozondjupa

=== Angola ===
- Cuando Cubango
- Cunene

== Tectonic history ==
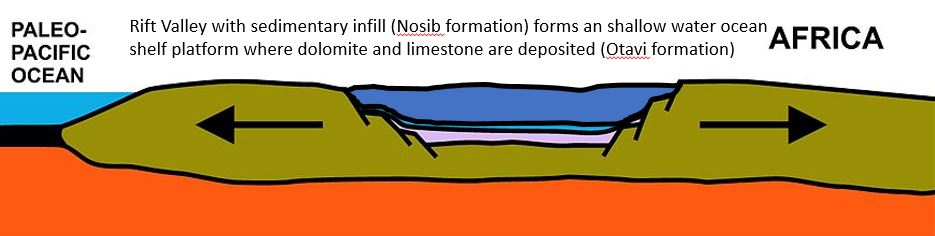
Rifting of the Congo Craton and formation of the Owambo Basin with subsequent deposition

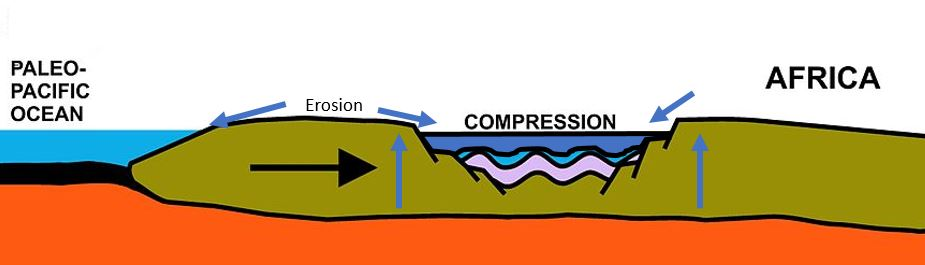
Compression of the Owambo Basin in the post-rift stage of the formation of Gondwana

=== Congo Craton origin ===
The Owambo Basin's basement is the Congo Craton, composed of solid granite and gneiss that likely devolatilized during magmatic events over 2.2BYA, meaning that it is exceptionally old and highly rigid. Since its original formation, the Congo Craton has undergone a series of collisional and rifting events including:

- 2.1 Ga - Collision into continent Atlantica
- 1.8 Ga - Collision into supercontinent Columbia
- 1.3 Ga - Rifting apart and formation of an independent continent with the Sao Francisco Craton
- 1.1 Ga - Collision and incorporation into supercontinent Rodinia

=== Creation of the Owambo Basin ===
The breakup of Rodinia (Late Precambrian) is the origin of the original depositional series of the Owambo Basin. The rifting apart of the Congo Craton from the Rodinean shallow sea created a classic pull-apart basin. Pull-apart basins are characterized by faults that create an area of crustal extension, causing uplift at the edges and a sinking of the center, which is infilled by sediment or, in this case, a shallow sea (See Image 3). The deposition of the Nosib Formation (900-750 Ma) is the original deposition from the mass wasting of the newly uplifted edges of the Congo Craton, followed by the Otavi Formation (750-650 Ma), composed of dolomite and limestone from the formation of the shallow sea.

=== Formation of Gondwana ===
The pull-apart basin was then compressed when the Congo Craton was forced back together in the formation of the Gondwana supercontinent. This caused extensive uplift of the Owambo Basin edges and deepening of the basin's center(see Image 4), resulting in a massive erosional event that formed the Mulden Group (600-560 Ma). These three groups (Nosib, Otavi, and Mulden) compose the sedimentary package known as the Damara Supergroup.

=== Glaciation ===
The Damara Supergroup has a relatively abrupt end when Gondwana shifts under the South Pole. The entirety of the Congo Craton is overlain by large glaciers from 420 Ma until around 280 Ma, when the continent shifted far enough away from the South Pole to allow deglaciation. As the glaciers melted, deep valleys are carved into the sedimentary Mulden group depositing glacial till along their path. This glacial till is included in the sedimentary package known as the Karoo Group (280-130 Ma). The valleys are filled with water from the melted glaciers and the Owambo Basin is again a shallow marine system with heavy carbonate and organic deposition.

=== Breakup of Gondwana ===
Idealized image showing the breakup of Gondwana as South America rifted away from Africa

The breakup of Gondwana began in the early Cretaceous (about 184-132 Ma). South America began to drift westward from Africa as the South Atlantic Ocean opened, resulting in complete open marine conditions by 110 Ma. During this, the Owambo Basin was reactivated as a pull-apart rift basin pulling apart from the east to the west, but received compression from the opening of the Damara Belt to its south. This created rotational seismic wrench systems across the basin profile. These wrench systems allowed for intrusions of continental igneous deposits: sills and dikes, along with pegmatites from metasomatized country rock. This intrusion of igneous material and hydrothermal activity led to heavy mineral depositions like the copper ore from the Tsumeb mine.

=== Desertification ===
In the mid-Cretaceous, Africa shifted to closer to the equator with the Owambo Basin landing at near 30° South latitude (very close to its current location), causing rapid desertification. This is represented in the stratigraphic sequence by a large depositional sequence that continues through the Quaternary. Beginning in the mid-Cretaceous, deposition of sandstones occur. These are labeled as the Kalahari Sequence, so named after the sand origin, the Kalahari Desert.

== Stratigraphy ==
=== Neoproterozoic ===
The earliest formation in the known stratigraphic history of the Owambo Basin comprises what is geologically termed the basement and is compositionally zoned with mostly granite and gneiss. There is a metamorphic overprint on the majority of the granite from the tectonic history of rifting and compression, causing mass devolitilization of the basement rock. This section is overlain by a layer of volcanics, a likely accompaniment to the compression involved in the formation of Rodinia.

=== Damara Supergroup ===
==== Nosib Group ====
The Nosib Group is charactererized by interbedded marine and continental sediment capped by volcanics. In the USGS stratigraphic column this is associated with the uplift of the Katangan orogeny 880 Ma, created during the series of rifting and compression of the Congo and Kalahari Cratons during the formation of the Gondwana supercontinent. The Owambo Basin is thought to originate at this time as a pull-apart basin filled with sediment from the surrounding uplifted areas, and eventually as a shallow marine system.

==== Otavi Group ====
The Otavi Group is composed entirely of shallow marine deposits. During this time period, the Owambo Basin was part of a shallow marine system that resulted in deposition of carbonates and organics, resulting in a layer of limestone and dolomite with interdispersed oolitic shoals.

==== Mulden Group ====
The Mulden Group was deposited after a major unconformity created by the uplift from the Kaoko Belt and Damara Belt collisions (580-530 Ma). During this time, the Owambo Basin was drained and exposed at the surface, causing massive erosion with minimal deposition. After 530 Ma, the rebound from the uplift of the Damara orogeny had caused the Owambo Basin to sink and it again filled with water to create a shallow marine system with deposition from both continental and marine organic sources. The stages between when the Owambo Basin was a transgressive vs regressive deposition system are bounded by a black shale marker that runs through the "middle" of the Mulden Group.

== Mining ==
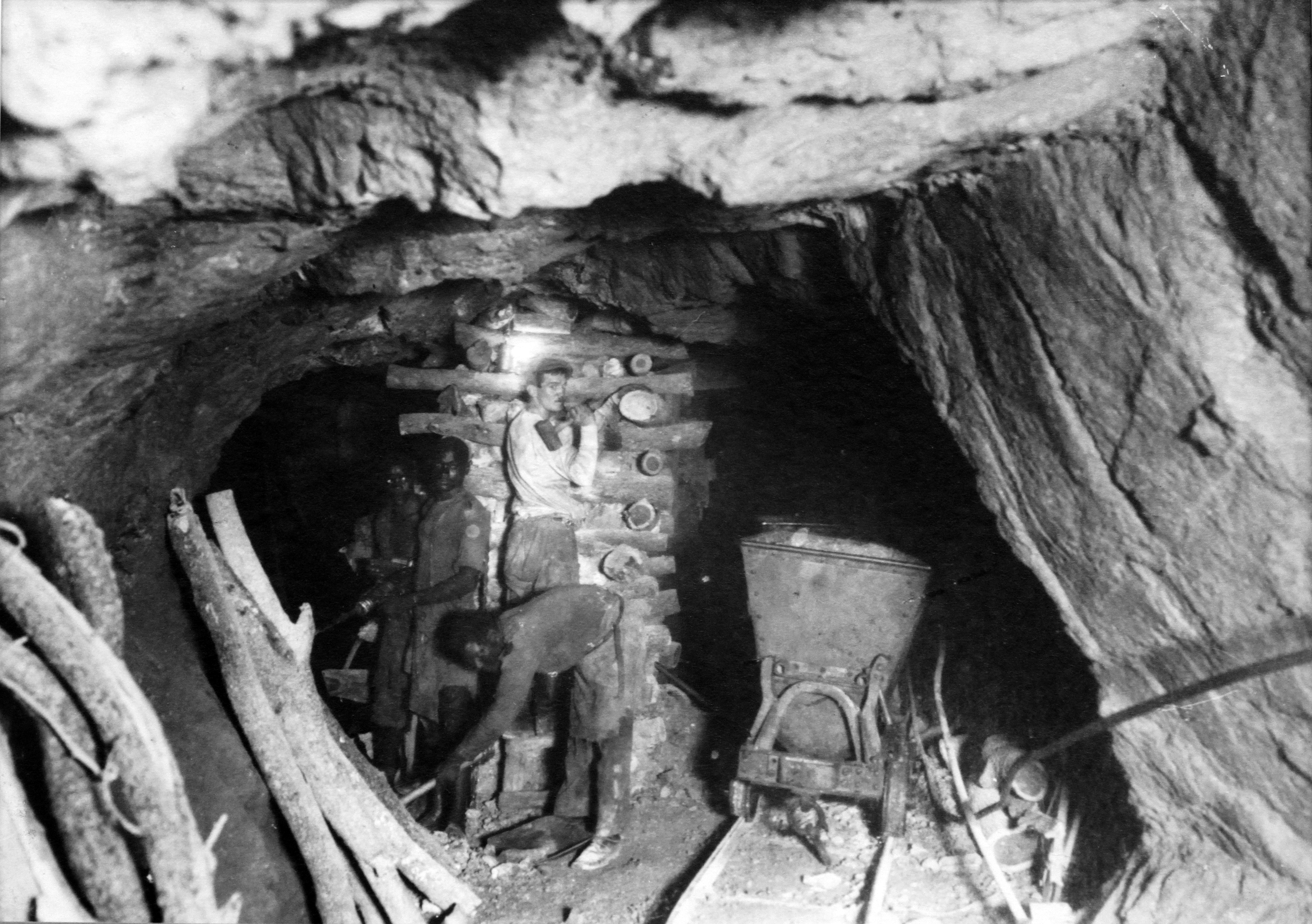
Tsumeb mining operation

Though the center of the Owambo Basin is a wildlife preservation area, the surrounding uplifted areas are rich in mineral and ore deposits. In terms of revenue mining is the largest contributor to Namibia's economy, accounting for over 25% of the country's income. The majority of this revenue is centered around diamond mining, however, Namibia is also a large producer of copper, lead, zinc, cement, and uranium. Due to the highly volatile nature of Angola's political system, its resources have been vastly untapped by the boom of the twenty-first century. In 2007, Angola was the third largest producer of diamonds in Africa with only 40% of the potential territory explored. It is also known as a major exporter of iron ore, with potential to market several other mineral resources including manganese, copper, gold, phosphates, marble, uranium, tin, fluorite, feldspar, gypsum, and talc.
