= Saurichnium =

Trace fossil classification
- Domain: Eukaryota
- Kingdom: Animalia
- Phylum: Chordata
- Clade: Dinosauria
- Clade: Saurischia
- Clade: Theropoda
- Ichnogenus: †Saurichnium; Gürich, 1926

Dinosaur footprint

Saurichnium is an ichnogenus of dinosaur footprint. Traces of different species of this genus have been found at Otjihaenamparero in central Namibia.

== See also ==
- List of dinosaur ichnogenera
