= Bajo de Véliz Formation =

Carboniferous and Permian stratigraphic formation in Argentina

- Stratigraphic range: Kasimovian-Asselian; ~306.9–295.0 Ma
- Type: Geologic formation
- Unit of: Paganzo Group
- Sub-units: Cautana, Pallero & Lomas members
- Overlies: San Luis Formation
- Thickness: 168 m (551 ft)

Lithology
- Primary: Siltstone
- Other: Sandstone

Location
- Coordinates: 32°18′41″S 65°24′48″W
- Approximate paleocoordinates: 49.1°S 59.5°W
- Region: San Luis Province
- Country: Argentina
- Extent: Paganzo Basin

Type section
- Named for: Bajo de Véliz Provincial Park
- Named by: Flores
- Year defined: 1969
- Bajo de Véliz Formation (Argentina)

The Bajo de Véliz Formation is stratigraphic formation of the Paleozoic located in the Paganzo Basin, Argentina. This formation lies in the northwestern sector of San Luis, about 25 km west of Santa Rosa de Conlara. Containing a slice of the Carboniferous-Permian transition, it is one of the key upper Paleozoic successions characterizing that era in westernmost Gondwana, which South America was a part of in the Paleozoic.

It consists of Cautana (Upper Carboniferous), Pallero (end-Pennsylvanian to Cisuralian), and Lomas (Permian) units. Based on the paleoflora found in the middle upper Pallero unit, it was suggested to be of earliest Cisuralian age of the early Permian, though there is still ambiguity as insects associated with that layer have been assigned to the late Pennsylvanian of the Carboniferous.

It is one of the key windows into the fossil life of the Gzhelian to Asselian, and is known as the formation where the thought-to-be giant spider Megarachne, actually a eurypterid, was discovered.

== Discovery ==
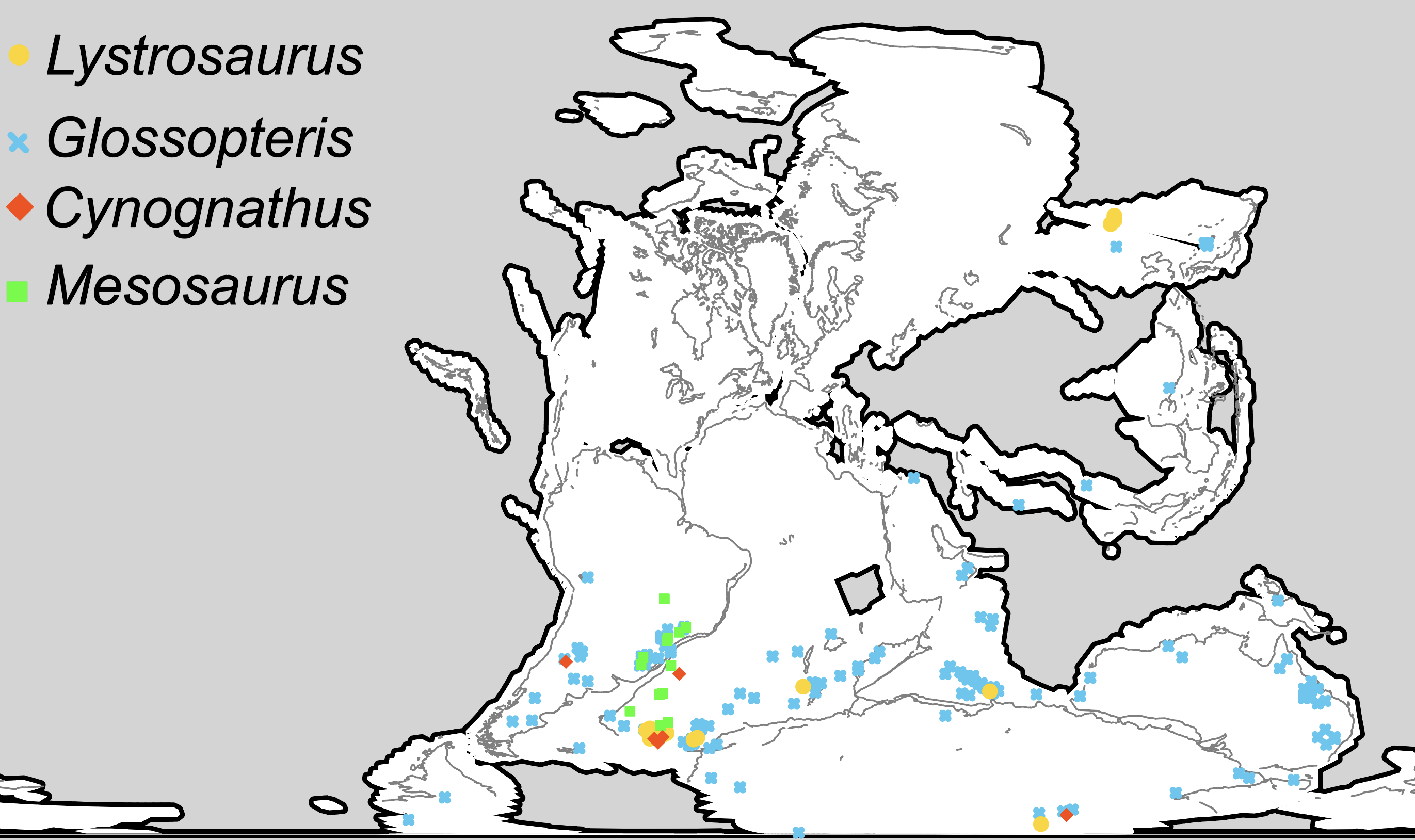
A map of Pangaea, with Gondwana in the southwest. Glossopteris is preserved in the Bajo de Veliz Formation.

The Bajo de Véliz Formation was defined by Flores in 1969, and then studied in greater detail by Hünicken and Pensa, in 1972. Hünicken and Pensa estimated a geological column of 168 meters in thickness.

For several years the area was exploited in order to extract slab stone. In the course of this activity, an extraordinary fossil was found due to its conservation status and its size, which was handed over to the Argentine paleontologist Mario Hünicken who in 1980 described it as Megarachne servinei. Research carried out subsequently produced remarkable findings in successive strata, several of which present evidence of insect fossils, bryophytes and paleozoic flora. It is estimated that this formation is 286 million years old.

The stratum is part of a protected natural park, Bajo de Véliz Provincial Park. The main geographical feature is a 12 km long depression. The Cautana Creek runs along most of its length. The stratigraphic succession of Bajo de Véliz is exposed by rocky outcrops such as a rock wall revealing the Pallero unit, and there are escarpments because the formation is cut and carved out of older crust.

== Composition ==
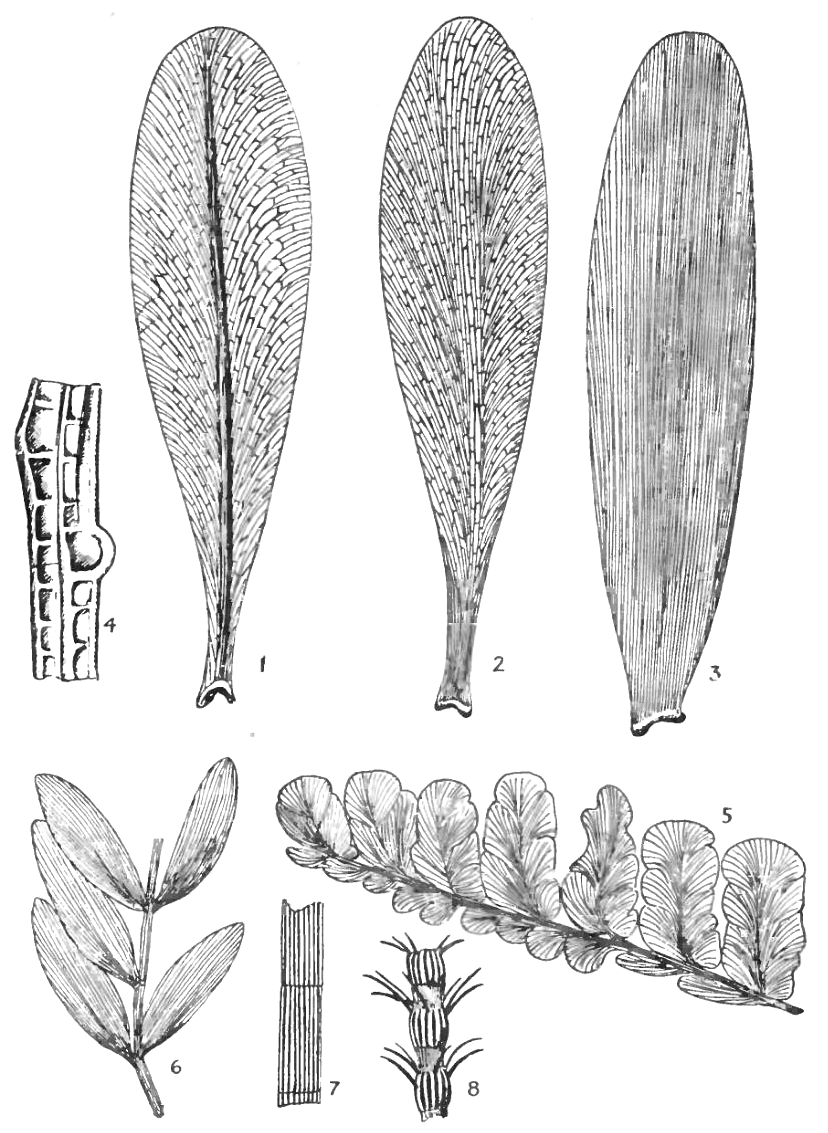
Assorted fossil flora of Gondwana, many of which have been found in Bajo de Veliz: 1, Glossopteris. 2, Gangamopteris. 3, Ncegyerathiopaia (Cordaites). 4, Vertebraria, the underground stem or rhizome of Glossopteris and Gangamopteris.

The Bajo de Véliz Formation is a 168 metres (551 ft) sedimentary deposit representing the Upper Carboniferous to Permian. It is located in a graben, which means it is a depressed block of the crust bordered by higher parallel faults. As a result, it is surrounded by much older rock which is raised above it on the sides, and forms a basement below. This ancient, separate unit is called the San Luis Formation, which ranges from the Upper Precambrian to the early Carboniferous in age, and includes igneous and metamorphic rocks. Among San Luis's metamorphic materials are phyllites. With the San Luis Formation, Bajo de Véliz forms a complex.

The Bajo de Véliz Formation can be described as silica-rich. It contains mostly greenish-grey sandstones and lutaceous sedimentary grains. Geologists starting with Hünicken and Pensa have classified the Bajo de Véliz unit into three component members: from lowest to highest, the Cautana, Pallero, and Lomas members.

The Cautana member (102 meters thick) contains clastic rock which grades upward from a coarse bed of polymictic conglomerate at the base, to an intercalated layer of sandstone and greenish-grey siltstone. This is overlaid by a caprock of arkosic or feldspar-rich sandstones and cut banks of greenish siltstone.

The Pallero member (53 meters thick) contains clearly-banded and fine-grained material: sandstones, as well as green beds with numerous fossil remains, dropstones, disk-shaped concretions. and varved clayrocks. Pallero's well-preserved fossils include plants, microfossils, and arthropods. At the time, it probably saw climatic variation and faced alternating or overlapping lacustrine (lake) and fluviatile (riverine) conditions, based on sedimentological and paleobotanical evidence. In the case of Megarachne, terrestrial biota were washed into an alluvial environment, buried by mud, and then preserved as carbonized replacements. Permian bryophyte genera are also found, such as Uskatia and Bajdaievia. Carbonated springs are thought to have formed three calcareous banks during times of low decomposition.

The Lomas member (13 meters thick) contains sandstone, which is medium to coarse-grained and ranges in color from yellowish to dark greenish, crowning the formation.

== Paleobiology ==
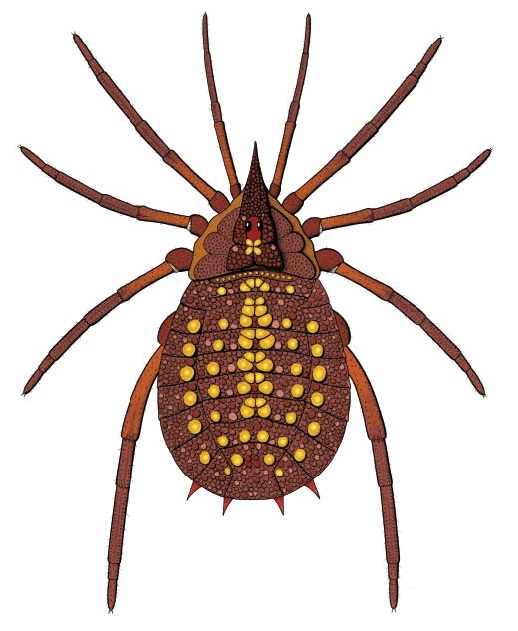
The Pallero unit preserves fossil arachnids, such as Trigonotarbid Gondwanarachne. A similar Late Carboniferous arachnid, Eophrynus (of Europe) is pictured.

The Bajo de Véliz succession preserves a number of fossil organisms directly, as well as ichnofossils of ancient biological activity. Most of its remains originate from the Carboniferous-Permian boundary, and include plants, arthropods, and worms.

=== Fossil flora and fauna ===
In the Gzhelian stage, the land that became the formation would have been a freshwater environment in a floodplain.

The Pallero Member provides well-preserved fossil plants: glossopterid, cordaitales, sphenophytes, pteridosperms, lycophytes, conifers and seeds. These include Gangamopteris, Euryphyllum, Glossopteris, and Samaropsis, The formation also preserves arthropods, including insects and eurypterids such as Megarachne,

The FS (fusus-subsaccata) biozone is well defined in the formation by the presence of Pakhapites fusus and abundant species of Vittatina subsaccata, which are fossilized pollen or spores. Similarly, the organic-walled microfossils of Clogranisporites patelliformis and Acantotriletes filiformis are preserved.

Bajo de Véliz contains a wide array of fossilized flying insects, such as the Rigattoptera (a pterygote classified in the order Protorthoptera), Megasecoptera, Velisoptera, and others. Trace activity of herbivorous invertebrates also survives. Insects fed on plants forming galls and oviposition traces, and to a lesser extent marginal damage from piercing and sucking mouthparts. There is also a trace fossil Meanderovaleichnus huenickeni. interpreted as the locomotion 'footprint' of a burrowing worm.
