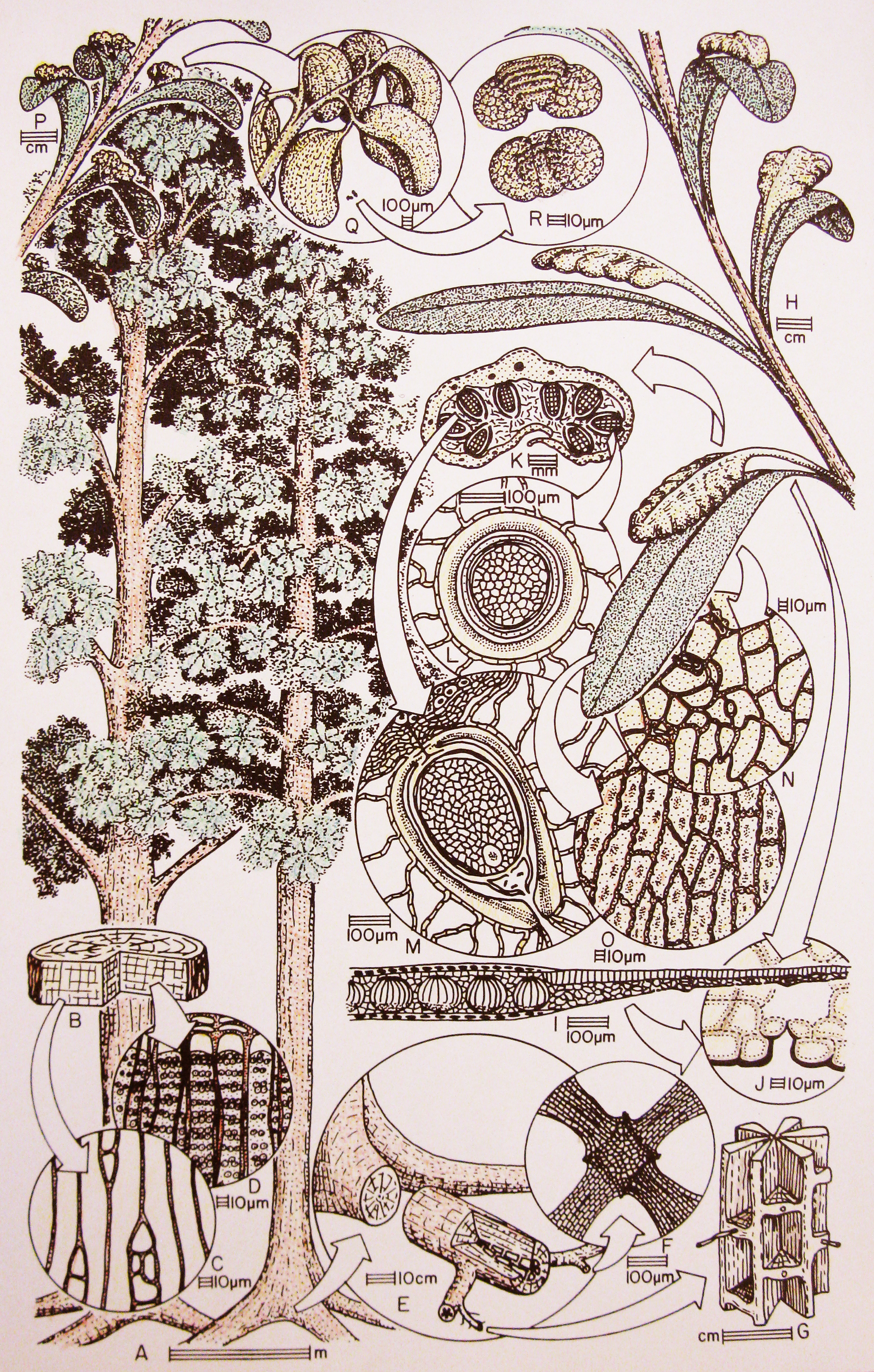
- Reconstruction of the glossopterid plant Dictyopteridium sporiferum, with Glossopteris communis leaves, Eretmonia hinjridaensis pollen organ, Protohaploxypinus limpidus pollen, Ararucarioxylon bengalense wood and chambered roots of Vertebraria australis from Late Permian Blackwater Coal Measures near Homevale Station, Queensland

Scientific classification
- Kingdom: Plantae
- Clade: Tracheophytes
- Order: †Glossopteridales
- Family: †Glossopteridaceae
- Genus: †Dictyopteridium; Feistmantel 1881

Species
- Dictyopteridium sporiferum impression ovulate structure; Homevaleia gouldii permineralized ovulate structure

= Dictyopteridium =

Dictyopteridium Temporal range: Late Permian

Extinct genus of plants

Dictyopteridium is an extinct genus of plants belonging to Glossopteridaceae, but the name is used only for compression fossils of elongate multiovulate reproductive structures adnate to Glossopteris leaves. Permineralized remains identical to Dictyopteridium have been referred to the organ genus Homevaleia

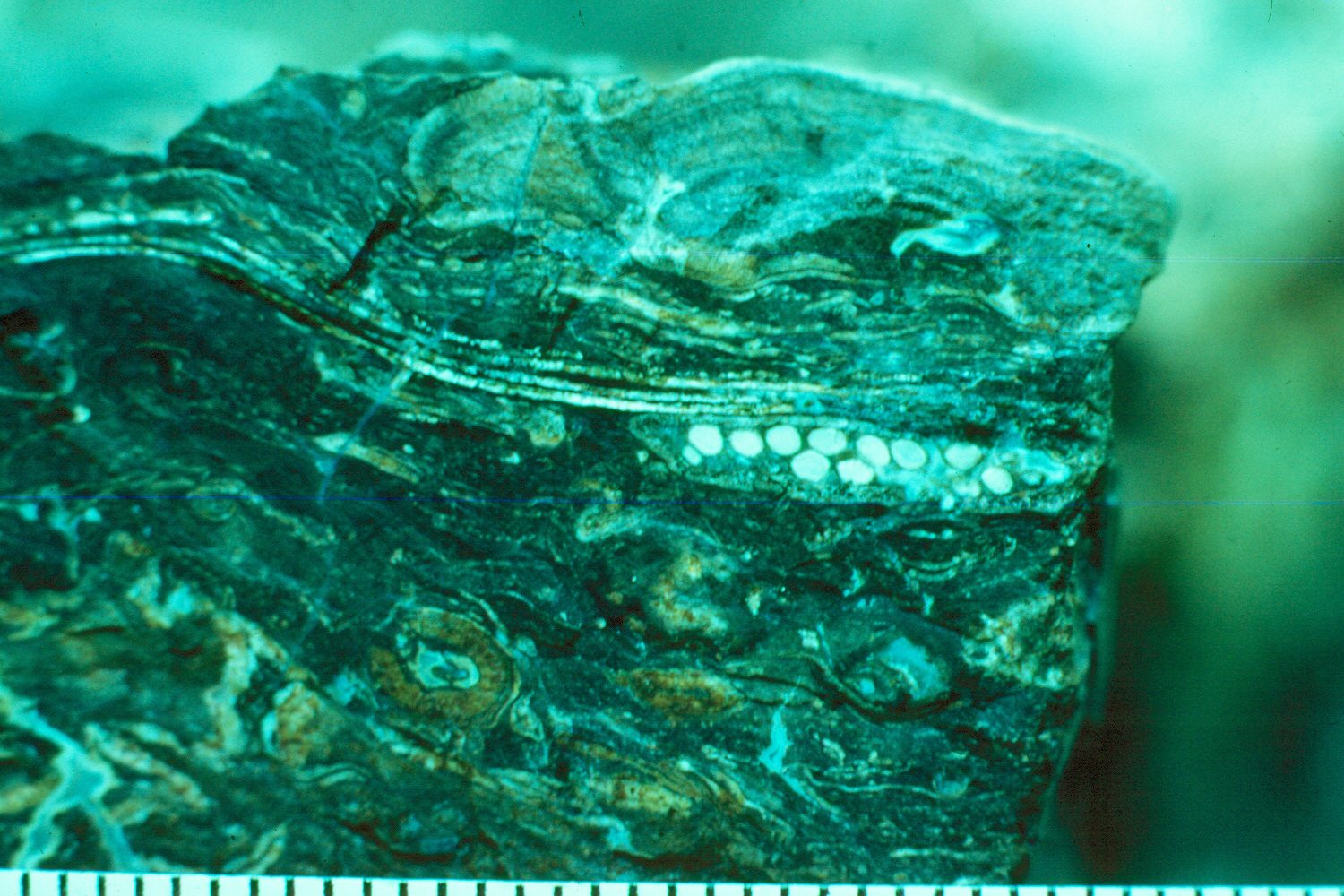
Hand specimen of Dictyopteridium sporiferum permimeralized peat of the Late Permian Blackwater Coal Measures near Homevale Station, Queensland

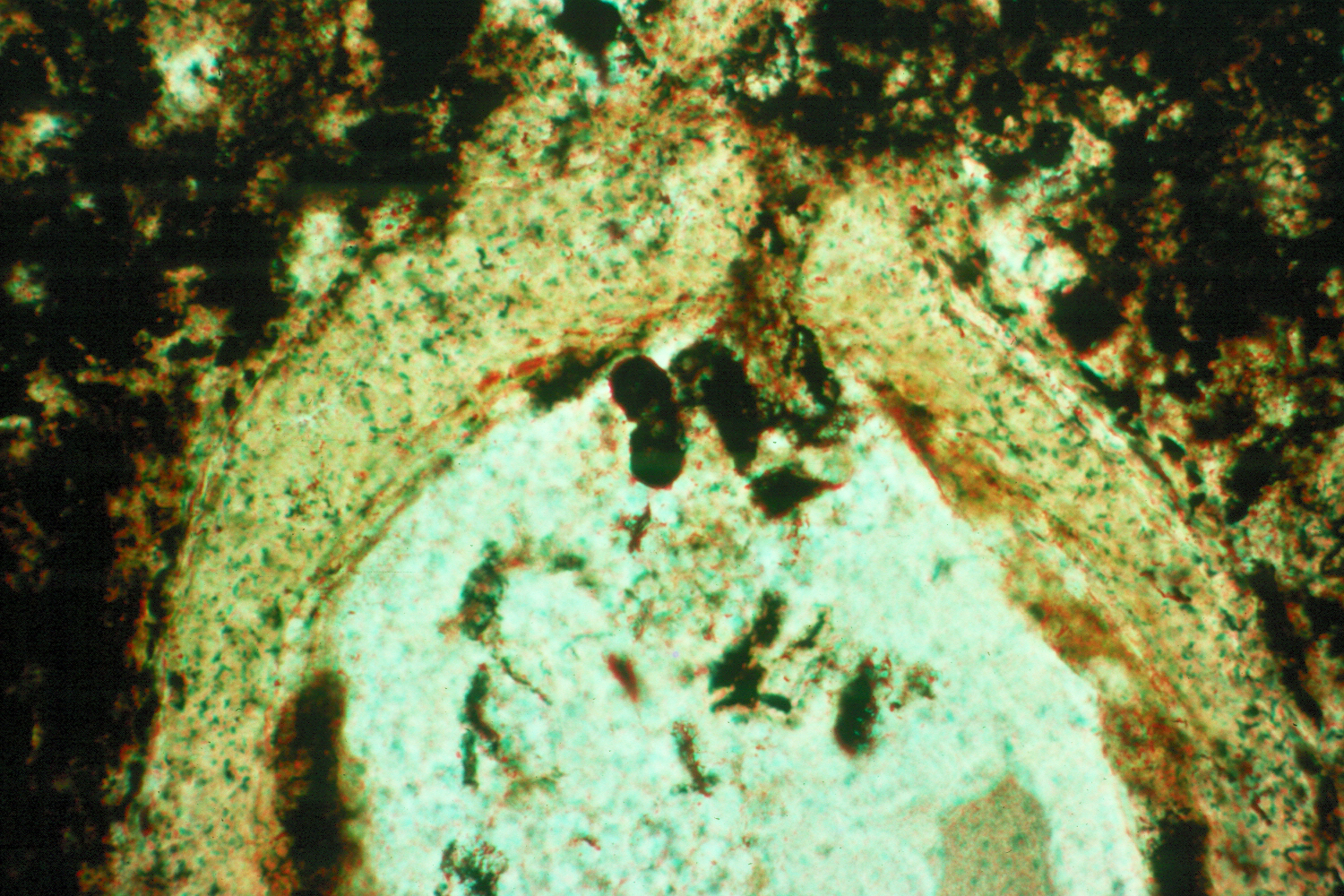
Pollen chamber with pollen of Protohaploxypinus limpidus in ovule Dictyopteridium sporiferum from permineralized peat of the Late Permian Blackwater Coal Measures near Homevale Station, Queensland

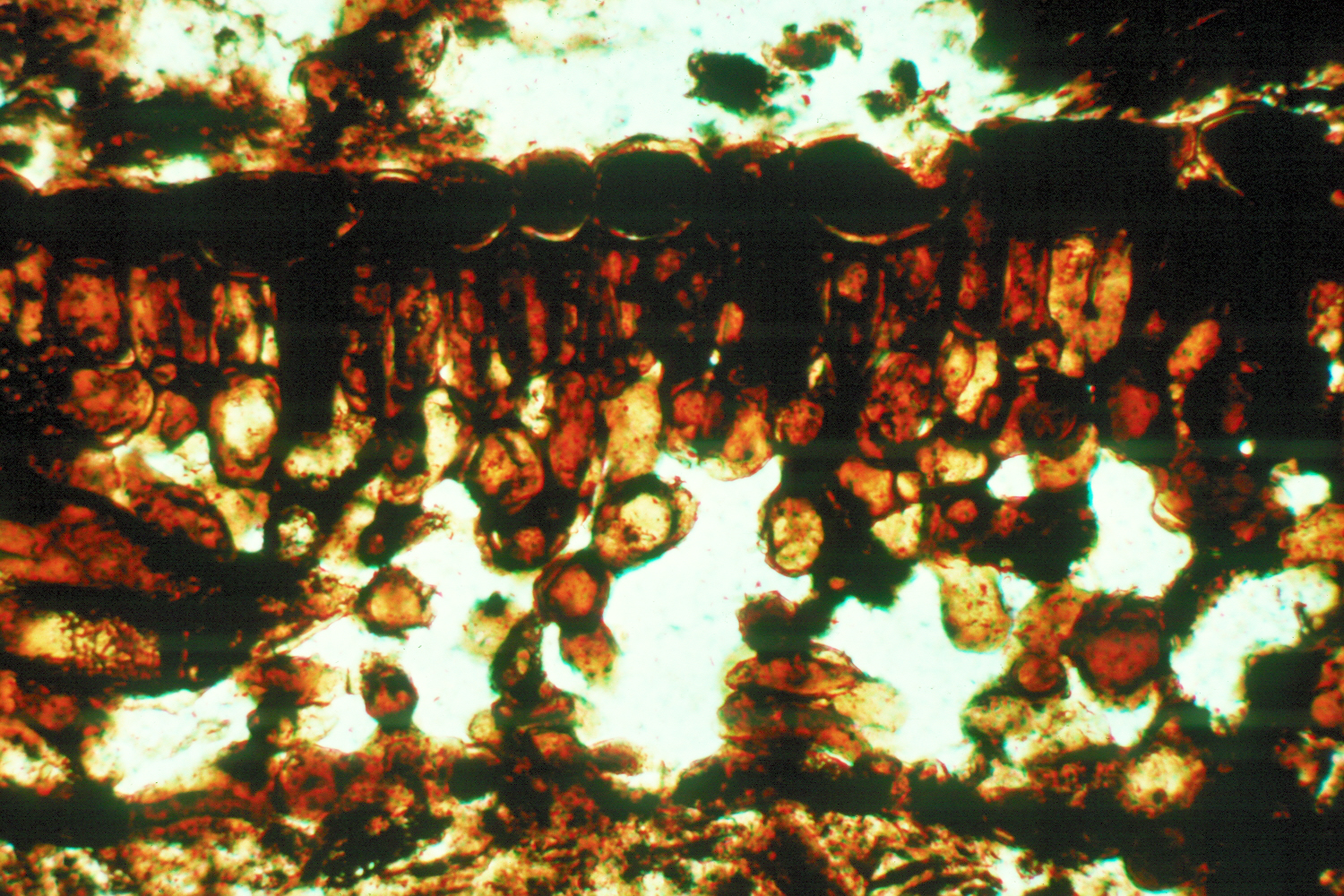
Leaf of Glossopteris communiswith palisade layer and lower stomatiferous surface preserved in permineralized peat of the Late Permian Blackwater Coal Measures near Homevale Station, Queensland

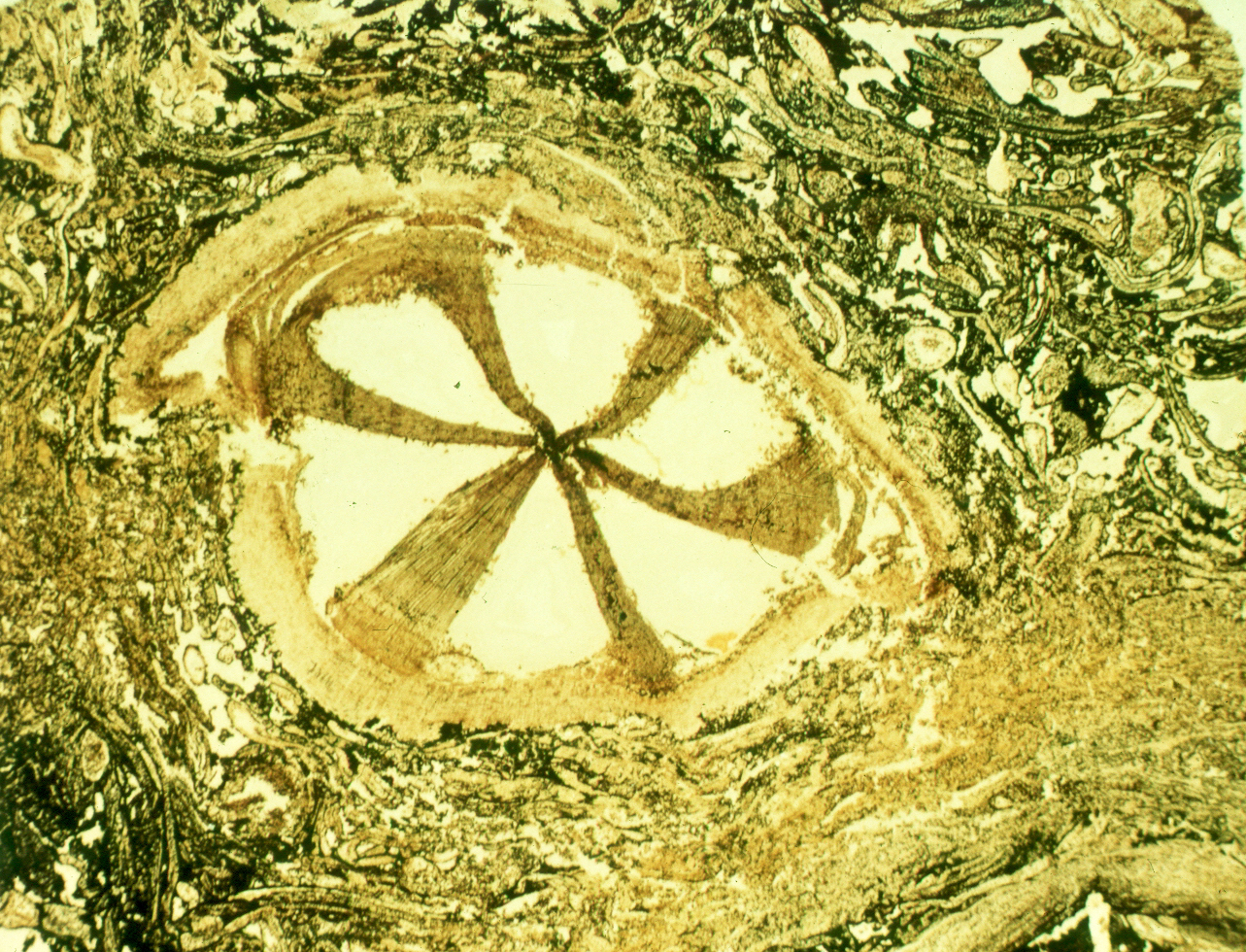
Chambered root of Vertebraria australis with thick secondary wood in permineralized peat of the Late Permian Blackwater Coal Measures near Homevale Station, Queensland

== Description ==
Dictyopteridium is an elongate leaf-like structure adnate to the upper surface of ordinary-appearing leaves of Glossopteris. It bore numerous ovules on its lower side which was folded over and filled with mucilage cells. Pollen still found its way into the pollen chambers of these protected seeds, and fertilization was by utilizing motile sperm with helical cilial bands.

== Whole plant associations ==
Permineralzed remains from the Late Permian Blackwater Coal Measures near Homevale Station, Queensland is evidence that the following paleobotanical organ genera were part of the same plant species: Dictyopteridium sporiferum impression of ovulate structure, Homevaleia gouldii permineralized ovulate structure, Glossopteris communis impressions of leaves, Eretmonia hinjridaensis pollen organ, Protohaploxypinus limpidus pollen, Araucarioxylon bengalense wood, and Vertebraria australis chambered roots.
