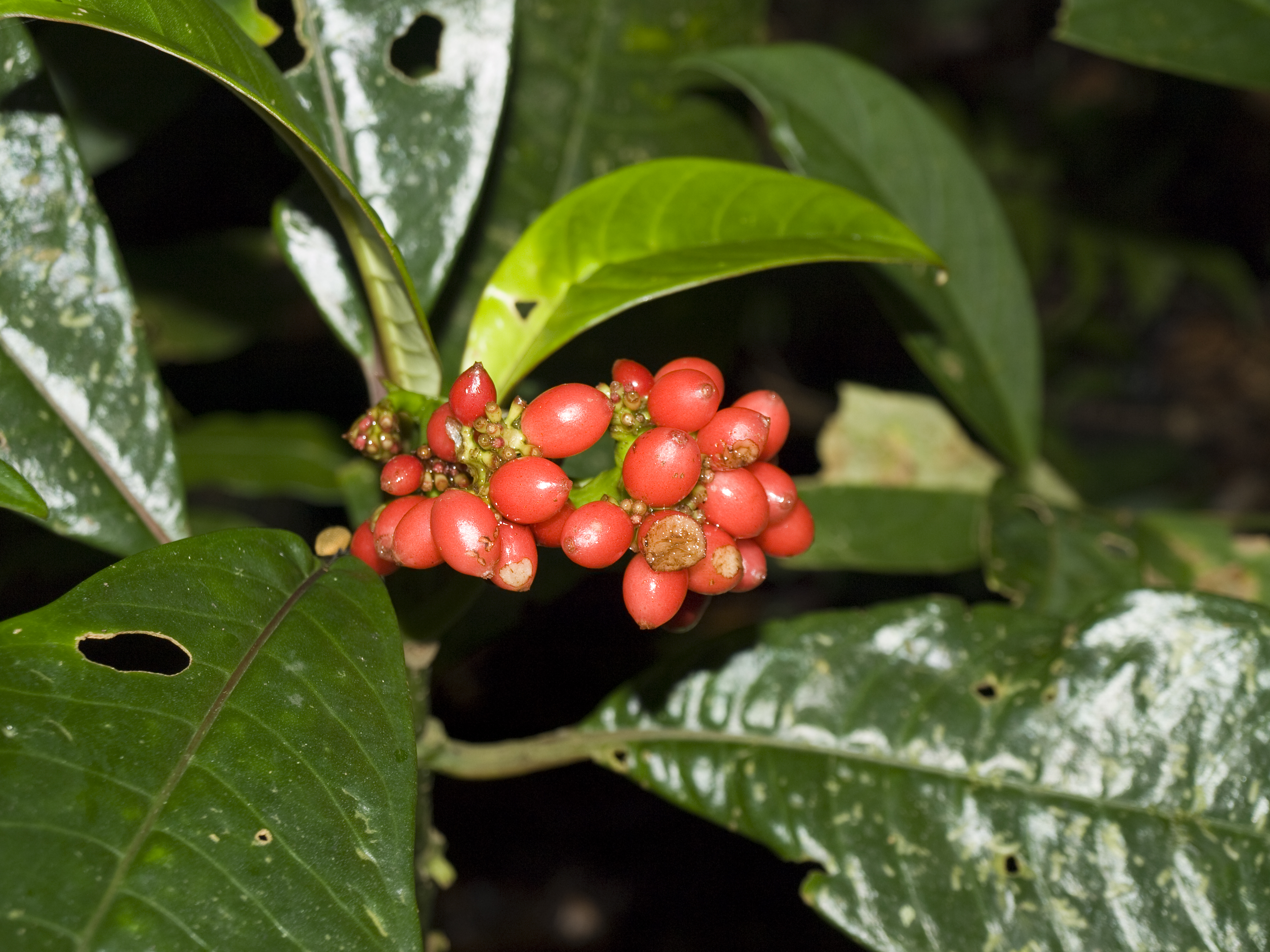
- Gnetum (cf. africanum) in Costa Rica

Scientific classification
- Kingdom: Plantae
- Clade: Embryophytes
- Clade: Polysporangiophytes
- Clade: Tracheophytes
- Clade: Spermatophytes
- Clade: Glossophytes

= Glossophyte =

Clade of seed-bearing plants

The glossophytes are a clade of seed plants comprising the glossopterids and their descendants. This includes the Gnetales and angiosperms, as well as Bennettitales.

Their monophyly is rather well supported by molecular methods, although their internal relationships are somewhat more shaky.

The clade had diverged by the Permian, when glossopterids appear in the fossil record.
