= Tres Islas Formation =

Geologic formation in Uruguay

The Tres Islas Formation is a Permian geologic formation in Uruguay. It underlies Mangrullo Formation.

The Almirón Hotsprings have their origin here.

== Bibliography ==
- Veroslavsky, Eduardo; Ubilla, Martín; Martínez, Sergio (eds.). Cuencas sedimentarias de Uruguay. Geología, paleontología y recursos naturales. Paleozoico (in Spanish). Montevideo: DI.R.A.C. ISBN 9974-0-0316-4.
