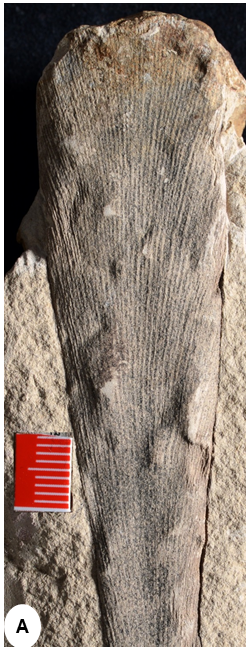
- Gangamopteris buriadica

Scientific classification
- Kingdom: Plantae
- Division: †Pteridospermatophyta
- Class: Gymnospermopsida
- Order: Glossopteridales
- Family: Rigbyaceae
- Genus: Gangamopteris McCoy, 1847

Species
- G. angustifolia; G. obovata; G. sulriograndensis

= Gangamopteris =

Gangamopteris Temporal range: Carboniferous- Permian 359.2–251 Ma

Extinct genus of plants

Gangamopteris is a genus of Carboniferous-Permian plants, very similar to Glossopteris. Previously, it was classified as fern with reproduction by seed. The genus is usually only applied to leaves, making it a form taxon. Gangamopteris dominates some coal deposits, such as those of the Beacon Supergroup.

In Paleorrota geopark in Rio Grande do Sul, Brazil, were found Gangamopteris obovata. Were located on the Mina Morro do Papaléo in Mariana Pimentel and Quitéria in Pantano Grande. Dating from the Permian and were in the Rio Bonito Formation. In the town of Cachoeira do Sul, met Gangamopteris sulriograndensis were discovered.
