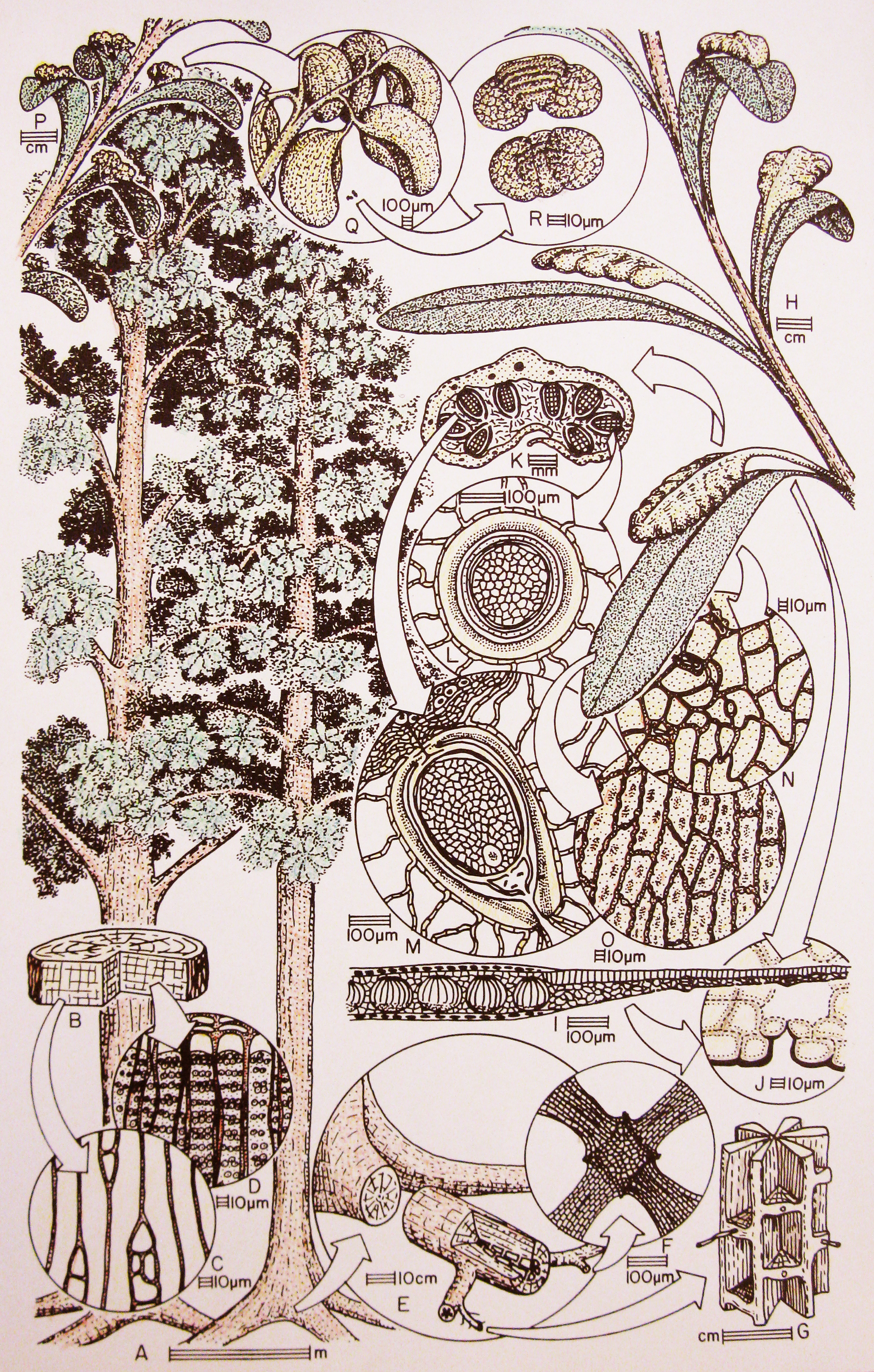
- Reconstruction of the glossopterid plant Dictyopteridium sporiferum, with Glossopteris communis leaves, Eretmonia hinjridaensis pollen organ, Protohaploxypinus limpidus pollen, Araucarioxylon bengalense wood and chambered roots of Vertebraria australis from Late Permian Blackwater Coal Measures near Homevale Station, Queensland

Scientific classification
- Kingdom: Plantae
- Clade: Tracheophytes
- Order: †Glossopteridales
- Family: †Dictyopteridiaceae; Rigby 1978

Genera
- Dictyopteridium ovulate structure; Eretmonia pollen organ; Glossopteris leaves; Ottokaria ovulate structure; Plumsteadia ovulate structure; Vertebraria chambered roots

= Dictyopteridiaceae =

Dictyopteridiaceae Temporal range: Late Permian

Extinct family of seed ferns

Dictyopteridiaceae are an extinct family of glossopterid plants known from the Permian period. It generally refers to reproductive organs, which are associated with Glossopteris leaves.
