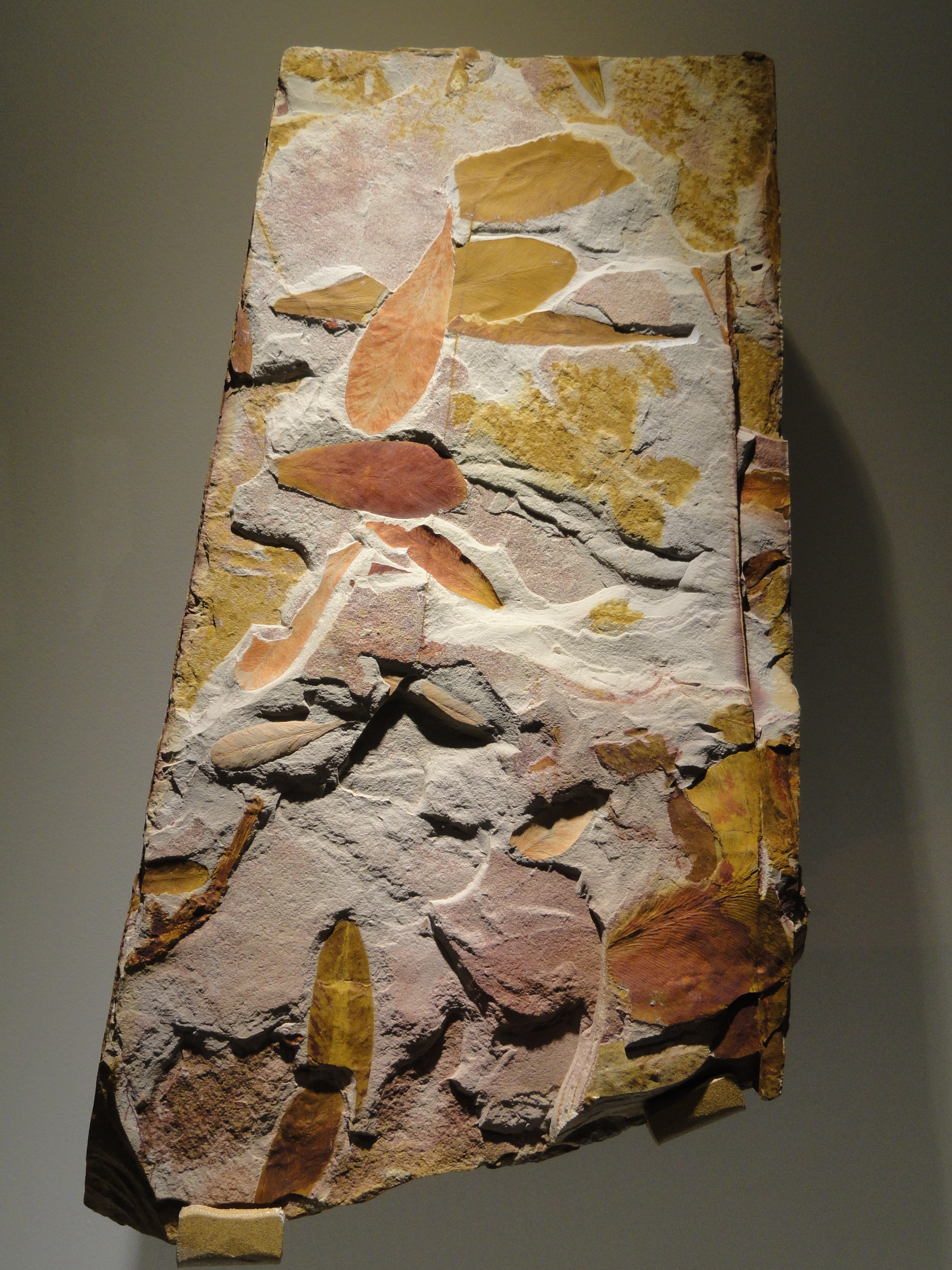
- Glossopteris sp.

Scientific classification
- Kingdom: Plantae
- Clade: Embryophytes
- Clade: Tracheophytes
- Order: †Glossopteridales
- Family: †Dictyopteridiaceae
- Genus: †Glossopteris; Brongniart 1828 ex Brongniart 1831

Species
- G. angustifolia; G. brasiliensis; G. browniana; G. communis; G. indica; G. occidentalis
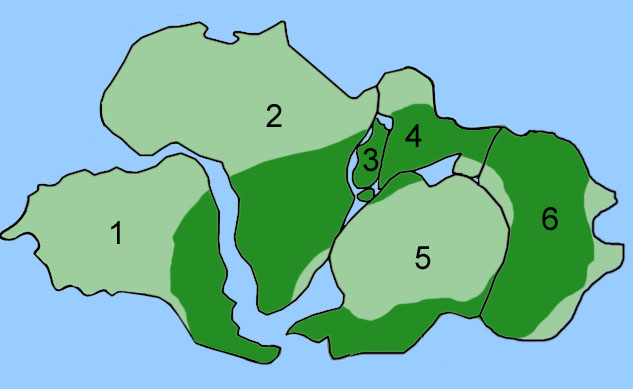
- Fossils of the gymnosperm Glossopteris (dark green) found in all of the southern continents provide strong evidence that the continents were once amalgamated into a supercontinent Gondwana.

= Glossopteris =

Glossopteris Temporal range: Cisuralian-Changhsingian

Genus of extinct seed plants

Glossopteris (etymology: from Ancient Greek γλῶσσα, glôssa 'tongue' + πτερίς, pterís 'fern') is the largest and best-known genus of the extinct Permian order of seed plants known as Glossopteridales (also known as Arberiales, Ottokariales, or Dictyopteridiales). The name Glossopteris refers only to leaves, within the framework of form genera used in paleobotany, used for leaves of plants belonging to the glossopterid family Dictyopteridiaceae.

Species of Glossopteris were the dominant trees of the middle to high-latitude lowland vegetation, often in swampy environments, across Gondwana (which at this time formed the southern part of Pangaea) during the Permian Period. Glossopteris fossils were critical in recognizing former connections between the various fragments of Gondwana: South America, Africa, India, Australia, New Zealand, and Antarctica.

The Glossopteris forest ecosystems became extinct as part of the end-Permian mass extinction event approximately 252 million years ago, which was caused by an abrupt rise in temperatures produced by the eruption of Siberian Traps.

== Description ==
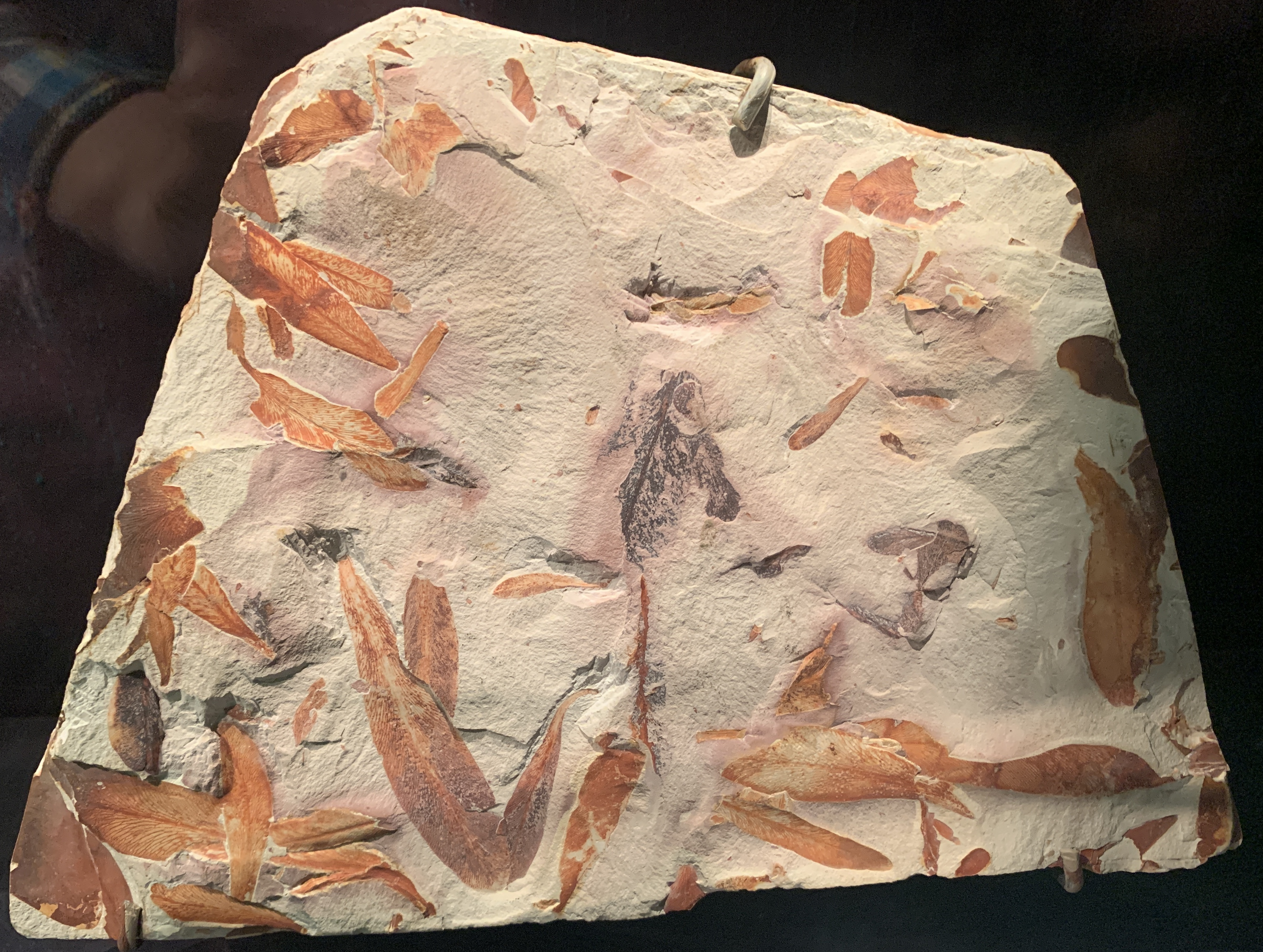
Glossopteris sp. Late Permian, Australia. At the Royal Tyrrell Museum of Palaeontology.

The leaves of Glossopteris are characterized by their distinctive tongue shape that gives them their name, as well as their reticulate venation. The leaves were either widely spaced on long stems, or were densely helically arranged on short shoots.

Glossopteris bearing plants grew as woody, seed-bearing trees and shrubs. Their trunks had a maximum diameter of 80 centimetres (2.6 ft), with some likely reaching a height of 30 metres (98 ft). They had a softwood interior resembling Araucariaceae conifers.

Seeds were borne on one side of variably branched or fused structures, and microsporangia containing pollen were borne in clusters at the tips of slender filaments. Both the seed- and pollen-bearing organs were partially fused (adnate) to the leaves, or, in some cases, possibly positioned in the axils of leaves. The homologies of the flattened seed-bearing structures have remained particularly controversial with some arguing that the fertile organs represent megasporophylls (fertile leaves) whereas others have interpreted the structures as flattened, seed-bearing, axillary axes (cladodes). It is unclear whether glossopterids were monoecious or dioecious, the fact that only pollen organ bearing leaves and not ovules were found in some layers suggest that at least some species were the latter.

== Distribution ==
More than 70 fossil species of this genus have been recognized in India alone, with additional species from South America, Australia, Africa, Madagascar and Antarctica. Essentially, Glossopteris was restricted to the middle- and high-latitude parts of Gondwana during the Permian and was an important contributor to the vast Permian coal deposits of the Southern Hemisphere continents. Most northern parts of South America and Africa lack Glossopteris and its associated organs.

However, in recent years a few disparate localities in Morocco, Oman, Anatolia, the western part of the island of New Guinea, Thailand and Laos have yielded fossils that are of possible glossopterid affinity. These peri-gondwanan records commonly occur together with Cathaysian or Euramerican plant species—the assemblages representing a zone of mixing between the strongly provincial floras of the Permian. Apart from those in India and the peri-gondwanan localities, a few other fossils from the Northern Hemisphere have been assigned to this group, but these are not identified with great certainty. For example, specimens assigned to Glossopteris from the far east of Russia in the 1960s are more likely to be misidentifications of other gymnosperms such as Pursongia. Confident assignment of fossil leaves to Glossopteris normally requires their co-preservation with the distinctive segmented roots of this group (called Vertebraria) or with the distinctive fertile organs. In 2018, Glossopteris leaves were reported from mid-Permian (Roadian – early Wordian) deposits in Mongolia, then located at high latitudes in the Northern Hemisphere, but these fossils were not found in association with other typical glossopterid organs, such as chambered roots or reproductive structures, so the phylogenetic affinities of these leaves remain uncertain.

== Chronology ==
The Glossopteridales arose in the Southern Hemisphere around the beginning of the Permian Period (298.9 million years ago), but became extinct during the end-Permian (Changhsingian) mass extinction. The putative persistence of Glossopteris into younger strata is commonly invoked on the basis of the distribution of dispersed taeniate bisaccate pollen. However, this category of pollen is known to have been produced by various seed plants, and Triassic examples, in the absence of convincing co-preserved Glossopteris leaves, probably belonged to non-glossopterid groups, such as voltzialean conifers. The distribution of Glossopteris across several, now detached, landmasses led Eduard Suess, amongst others, to propose that the southern continents were once amalgamated into a single supercontinent—Pangea. These plants went on to become the dominant elements of the southern flora through the rest of the Permian but disappeared in almost all places at the end of the Permian (251.902 million years ago). The only potential Triassic records are Glossopteris leaves exposed in the banks of the Gopad River near Nidpur, India, but even these records are stratigraphically ambiguous owing to faulting and complex juxtapositioning of Permian and Triassic strata at Nidpur. Moreover, even if some Glossopteris leaves do persist above the end-Permian extinction horizon, this level pre-dates the Permian-Triassic boundary proper in continental settings of Gondwana by several hundred thousand years and there are no convincing examples of Glossopteris in confidently dated Triassic strata. Although most modern palaeobotany textbooks cite the continuation of glossopterids into later parts of the Triassic and, in some cases into the Jurassic, these ranges are erroneous and are based on misidentification of morphologically similar leaves such as Gontriglossa, Sagenopteris, or Mexiglossa. Glossopterids were, thus, one of the major casualties of the end-Permian mass extinction event.

== Taxonomy ==
Long considered a fern after its discovery in the 1820s, it was later assigned to the gymnosperms sensu lato (i.e. Spermatophyta). The genus is in the order Glossopteridales, which is placed in the division Pteridospermatophyta (often informally called "seed ferns"). In reality, many of the plant groups included within this division are only distantly related to one another, and the relationships of Glossopteridales to other seed plant groups is unclear. Some authors have suggested that the Glossopteridales are closely related to flowering plants, though the evidence for such a relationship is weak.

Glossopteris should strictly be used to refer to the distinctive spathulate fossil leaves with reticulate venation, however, the term has also been used to refer to the parent plant as a whole. Leaves of Glossopteris are associated with reproductive structures belonging to the family Dictyopteridiaceae within the Glossopteridales.

The name comes from Ancient Greek γλώσσα (glṓssa 'tongue'), because the leaves were tongue-shaped, and πτέρις (pteris 'fern, feathery').

== Paleoecology ==
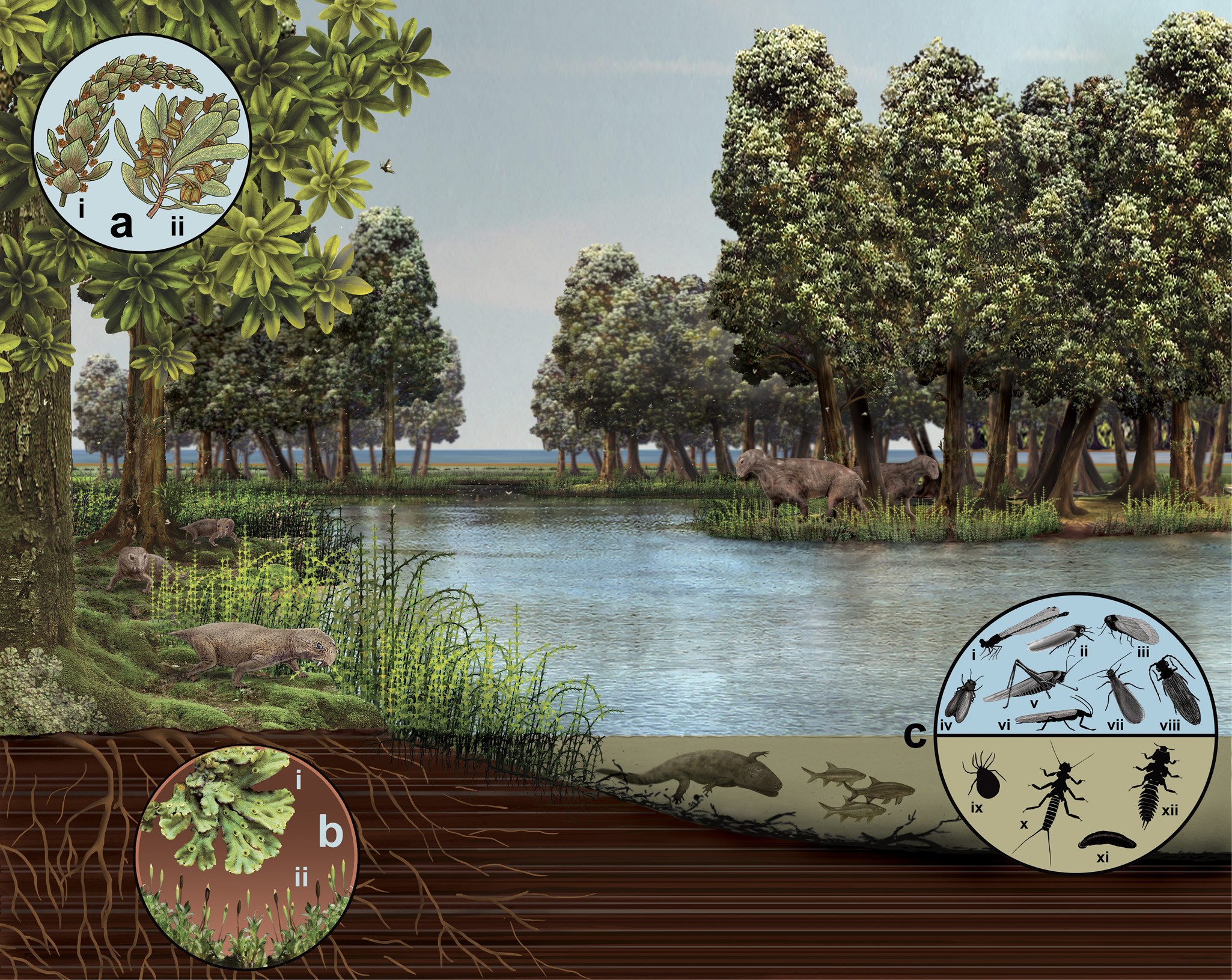
Reconstruction of trees of Glossopteris at the Middle Permian Onder Karoo locality in South Africa with male (ai) and female (aii) reproductive organs inset

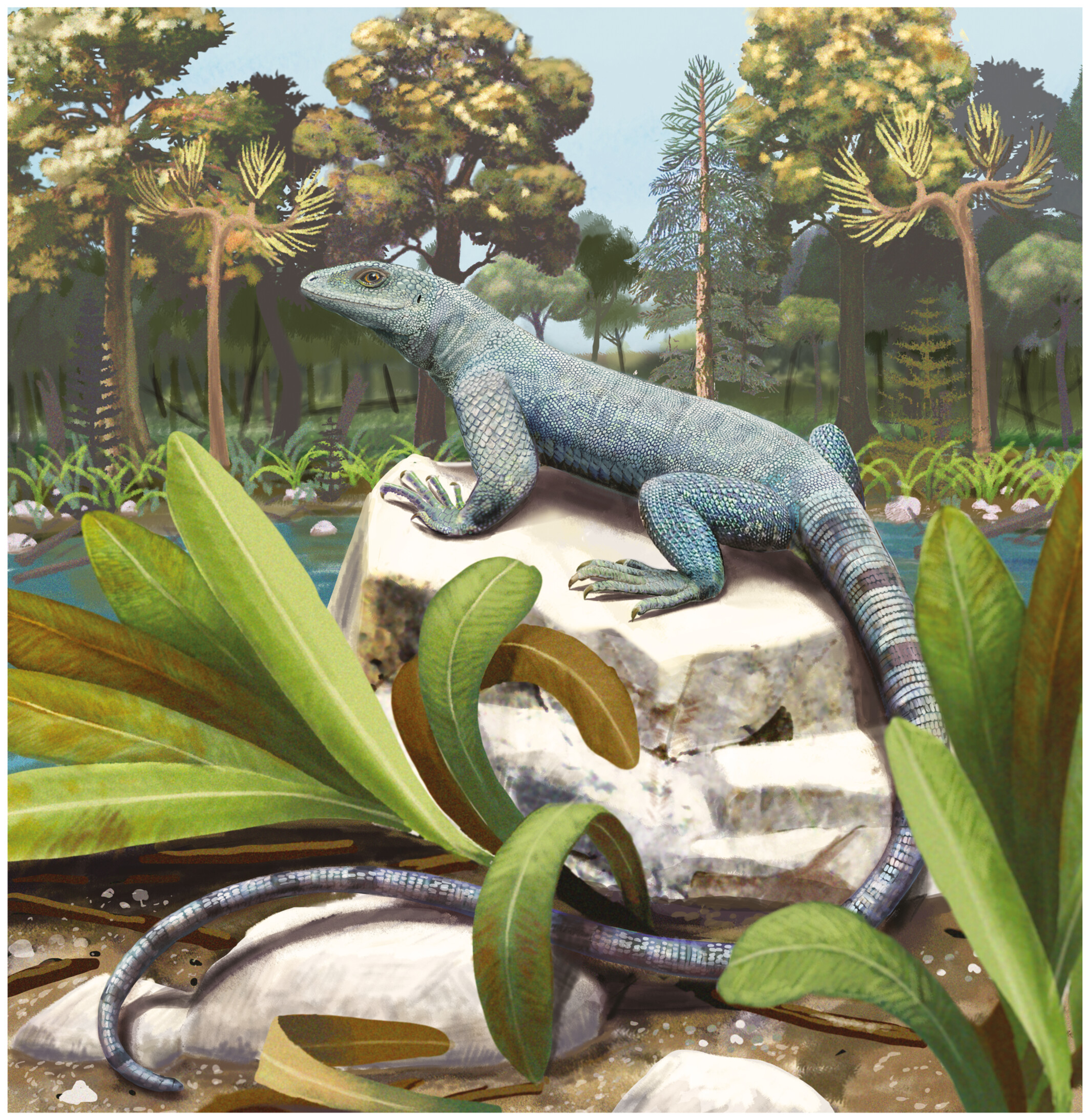
Restoration of the environment of the Late Permian Lower Sakamena Formation, Madagascar, with Glossopteris leaves in foreground (along with the lizard-like reptile Thadeosaurus) and trees in background

They are interpreted to have grown in very wet soil conditions, similar to the modern Bald Cypress. The leaves ranged from about 2 cm to over 30 cm in length.

The profile of glossopterid trees is largely speculative as complete trees have not been preserved. However, based on analogies with modern high-latitude plants, polar-latitude Glossopteris trees have been suggested to have had a tapered, conical profile like that of a Christmas tree and to have been relatively widely spaced to take advantage of the low-angle sunlight at high latitudes, instead of needles, they had large, broad lance- or tongue-shaped leaves commonly with well differentiated palisade and spongy mesophyll layers.

Glossopteris trees are assumed to have been deciduous, as fossil leaves are commonly found as dense accumulations representing autumnal leaf banks. The broad fossilized growth rings in Glossopteris woods from Antarctica, then part of Gondwana, reveal that the plants experienced strong growth spurts each spring-summer but underwent the abrupt cessation of growth before each following winter, a transition that could take as little as a month. The idea that all Glossopteris species are deciduous has been challenged, with an isotopic study finding that Antarctic Glossopteris forests were mixed evergreen-deciduous.

The Glossopteris bearing plants are likely to have primarily been wind pollinated. Seeds borne by Glossopteris bearing plants include the genera Plectilospermum, Choanostoma, Pachtestopsis, Illawarraspermum, Lakkosia, Lonchiphyllum and Homevaleia. Many of these bear wings, and it is likely that at least some of these were wind dispersed. One species Choanostoma verruculosum, may have been adapted to being dispersed by water.

Glossopteris leaves are morphologically simple so there are few characters that can be used to differentiate species. Consequently, many past researchers have considered the Permian Glossopteris flora to be rather homogeneous with the same species distributed throughout the Southern Hemisphere. However, more recent studies of the more morphologically diverse fertile organs have shown that taxa had more restricted regional distributions and several intra-gondwanan floristic provinces are recognizable. Seeds, much too large to be wind-borne, could not have blown across thousands of miles of open sea, nor is it likely they have floated across vast oceans. Observations such as these led the Austrian geologist Eduard Suess to deduce that there had once been a land bridge between these areas. He named this large land mass Gondwanaland (named after the district in India where the plant Glossopteris was found). These same observations would also lend support to Alfred Wegener's Continental drift theory.

The first Antarctic specimens of Glossopteris were discovered by members of Robert Scott's doomed Terra Nova expedition. The expedition members abandoned much of their gear in an effort to reduce their load, but kept 35 pounds (16 kg) of Glossopteris fossils; these were found alongside their bodies.

== Extinction ==
The Glossopteris forest ecosystems across Gondwana collapsed at the end of the Permian as part of the end-Permian mass extinction event. Dating of deposits in the Sydney Basin of Australia suggests that the collapse of the Glossopteris forest ecosystem occurred there before 252.3 million years ago, over 350,000 years before the main marine mass extinction at the Permian-Triassic boundary around 251.9 million years ago. The extinction event is thought to have been caused by the immense volcanic eruptions which formed the Siberian Traps, leading to a sudden spike in temperatures, suggested to be around "10 to 15°C globally in a few hundred years" as well as other effects like depleting the ozone layer. In its place, other plant such as Dicroidium would come to dominate Gondwana during the Triassic period.

== See also ==
- Dicroidium an extinct corystosperm tree that was widespread and dominant over Gondwana during the Triassic
- Wadadam Fossil Park

== Sources ==
- Brongniart, A. 1828. Prodrome d'une histoire des végétaux fossiles. Paris. 223 pp.
- Brongniart, A. 1832. Histoire des végétaux fossiles ou recherches botaniques et géologiques sur les végétaux renfermés dans les diverses couches du globe. G. Dufour and E. D'Ocagne, Paris 1: 265–288.
- Anderson, H.M. & Anderson, J.M. 1985. The Palaeoflora of Southern Africa: Prodromus of Southern African Megafloras, Devonian to Lower Cretaceous. A.A. Balkema, Rotterdam. 416 pp.
- Chandra, S. & Surange, K.R. 1979. Revision of the Indian species of Glossopteris. Monograph 2. Birbal Sahni Institute of Palaeobotany, Lucknow. 301 pp.
- Davis, Paul and Kenrick, Paul. 2004. Fossil Plants. Smithsonian Books (in association with the Natural History Museum of London), Washington, D.C. ISBN 1-58834-156-9
- Gould, R. E. and Delevoryas, T., 1977. The biology of Glossopteris: evidence from petrified seed-bearing and pollen-bearing organs. Alcheringa, 1: 387–399.
- Pant DD 1977 The plant of Glossopteris. J Indian Bot Soc 56: 1-23.
- Pant, D.D. & Gupta, K.L. 1971. Cuticular structure of some Indian Lower Gondwana species of Glossopteris Brongniart. Part 2. - Palaeontographica, 132B: 130–152.
- Pant, D.D. & Nautiyal, D.D. 1987. Diphyllopteris verticellata Srivastava, the probable seedling of Glossopteris from the Paleozoic of India. - Rev. Palaeobot. Palynol., 51: 31–36.
- Pant, D.D. & Pant, R. 1987. Some Glossopteris leaves from Indian Triassic beds. - Palaeontographica, 205B: 165–178.
- Pant, D.D. & Singh, K.B. 1971. Cuticular structure of some Indian Lower Gondwana species of Glossopteris Brongniart. Part 3. - Palaeontographica, 135B: 1-40.
- Pigg, K. B. 1990. Anatomically preserved Glossopteris foliage from the central Transantarctic Mountains. Rev. Palaeobot. Palynol. 66: 105–127.
- Pigg, K.B.; McLoughlin, S. (1997). "Anatomically preserved Glossopteris leaves from the Bowen and Sydney basins, Australia". Review of Palaeobotany and Palynology. 97 (3–4): 339–359. Bibcode:1997RPaPa..97..339P. doi:10.1016/s0034-6667(97)00007-9.
- Plumstead, E.P. (1969), Three thousand million years of plant life in Africa. Alex L. du Toit Memorial Lecture no. 11. Trans. Geol. Soc. S. Afr. 72 (annex.): 1-72.
- Taylor, E.L, Taylor, T.N. & Collinson, J.W. 1989. Depositional setting and palaeobotany of Permian and Triassic permineralized peat from the central Transantarctic Mountains, Antarctica. - Internat. J. Coal Geol., 12: 657–679.
