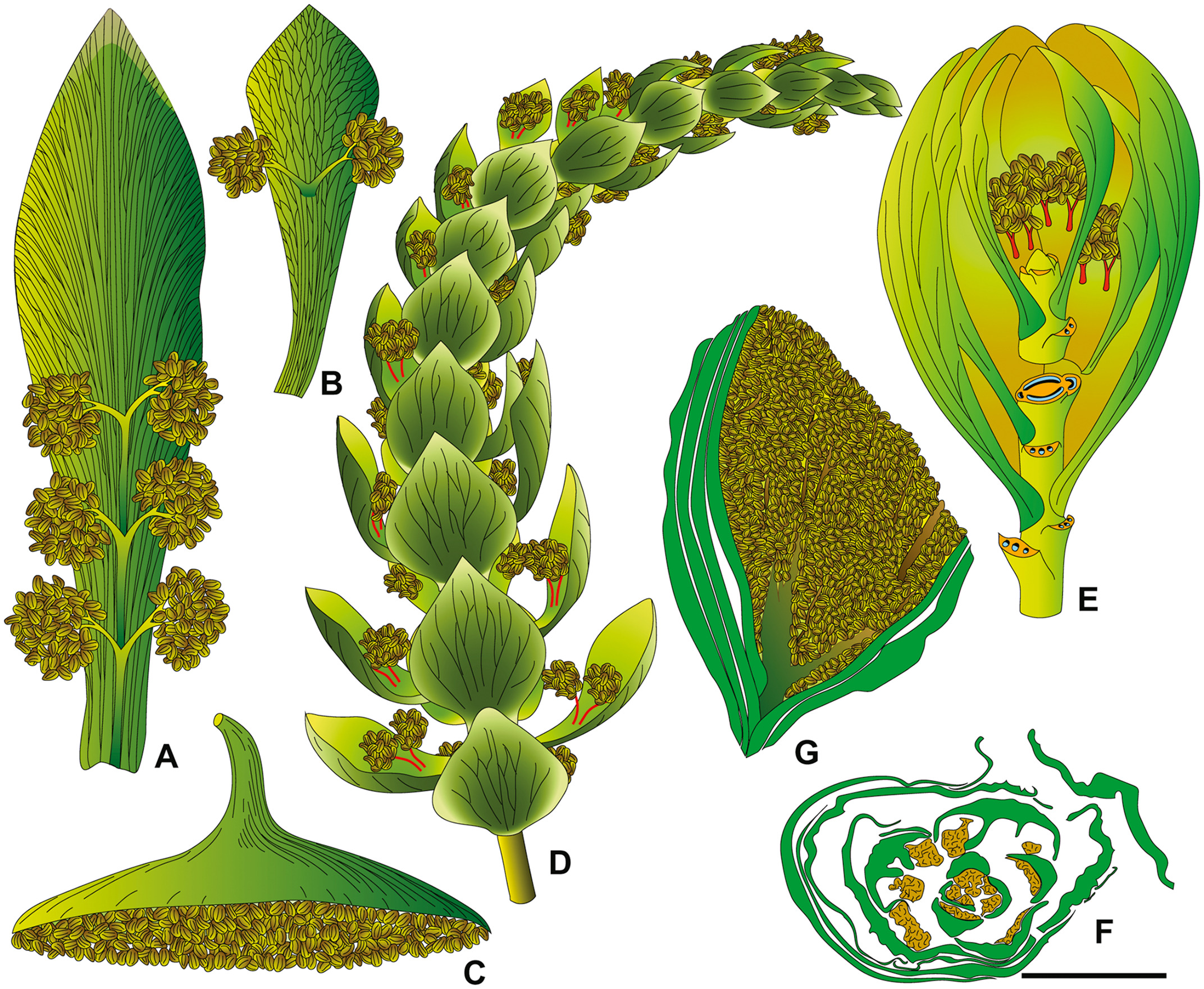
- Various glossopterid pollen bearing reproductive structures
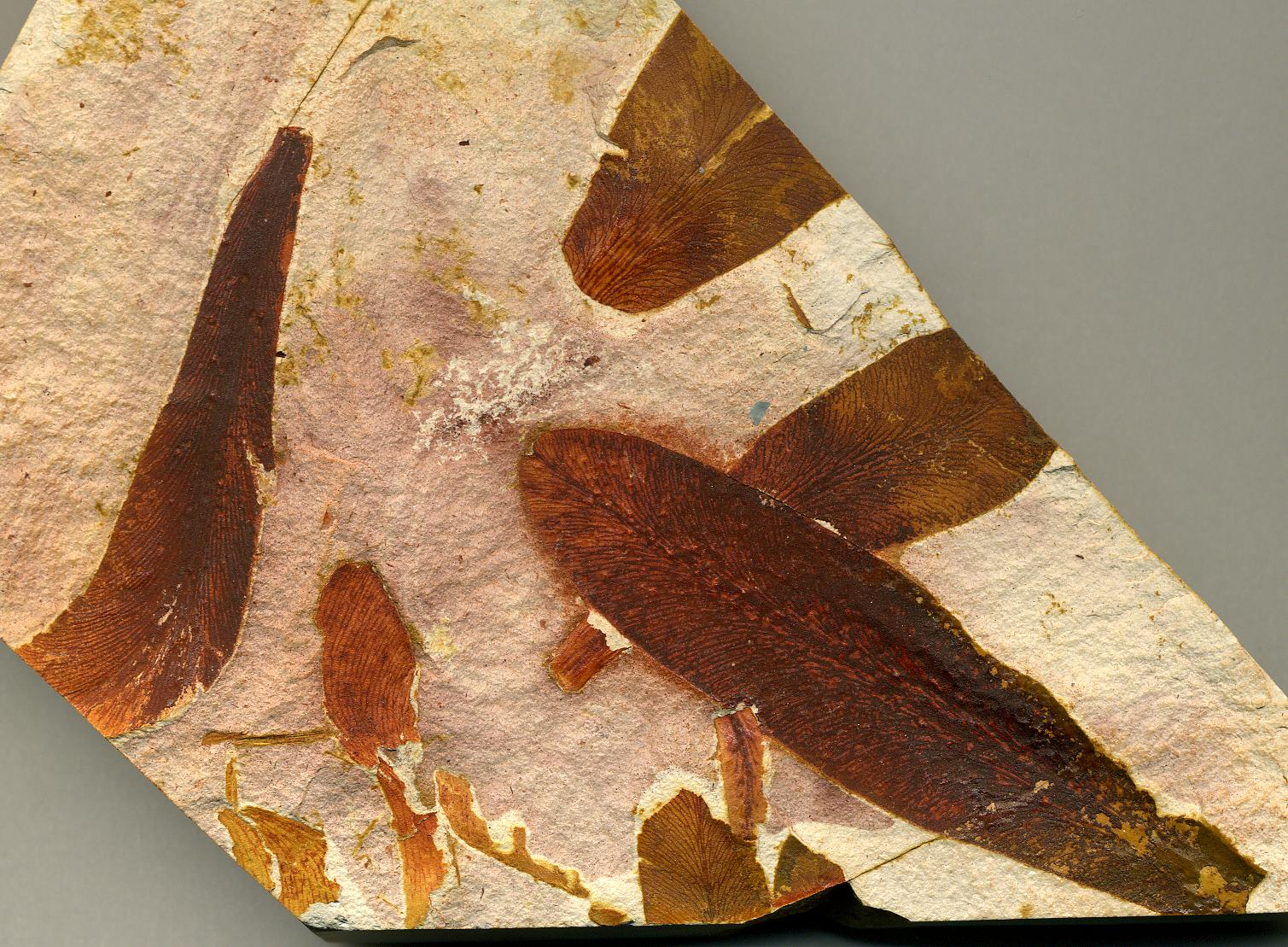
- Leaf of Glossopteris

Scientific classification
- Kingdom: Plantae
- Clade: Tracheophytes
- Clade: Spermatophyta
- Order: †Glossopteridales; Plumstead, 1956

Families
- Dictyopteridiaceae; Rigbyaceae; Arberiaceae; Lidgettoniaceae

Synonyms
- Arberiales; Ottokariales

= Glossopteridales =

Glossopteridales Temporal range: Permian

Extinct order of seed ferns

Glossopteridales is an extinct order of seed plants, known from the Permian of Gondwana. They arose at the beginning of the Permian, and the majority or all members of the group became extinct during the Permian–Triassic extinction event, 251.9 mya. Possible Triassic records of the group have been recorded. The best known genus is Glossopteris, a leaf form genus. Other examples are Gangamopteris, Glossotheca, and Vertebraria.

Permian permineralised glossopterid reproduction organs found in the central Transantarctic Mountains suggest seeds had an adaxial attachment to the leaf-like mega-sporophyll. This indicate Glossopteridales can be classified as seed ferns and is important in determining the status of the group as either close relatives or ancestors of the angiosperms.

Midrib-less forms were common in the Early Permian whereas midrib forms were more common in the Late Permian.

== See also ==
- Glossophyte
