= Buffelskloof Formation =

Geological formation in the Uitenhage Group of the Algoa Basin in South Africa

- Stratigraphic range: Early Cretaceous
- Map showing the location of the formation
- Type: Geological formation
- Unit of: Uitenhage Group
- Underlies: Algoa Group
- Overlies: Kirkwood Formation

Lithology
- Primary: Conglomerate
- Other: Sandstone

Location
- Region: Western Cape
- Country: South Africa

The Buffelskloof Formation is a geological formation found in the Western Cape province in South Africa. It is the uppermost of the four formations found within the Uitenhage Group of the Algoa Basin. It is considered an informal formation by some of the literature as it is very thin and only outcrops as isolated horizons in the Oudshoorn-Gamtoos, Herbertsdale-Mossel Bay, and Heidelberg-Riversdale Basins. Along the Worcester-Pletmos Basin, it occurs in patches along the southern flanks of the Langeberg mountain range - from Worcester in the west and as far as Mossel Bay in the east. From Mossel Bay this formation is inter fingered by the informal Hartenbos Formation. The Buffelskloof and Hartenbos Formations only occur in the Oudshoorn-Gamtoos and Herbertsdale-Mossel Bay basins and seem to correlate to the Sundays River Formation in age.

== Geology ==
The Buffelskloof Formation was formed along the southern section of South Africa during the break up of Gondwana when there was widespread erosion of rocks comprising the Cape Fold Belt. The Buffelskloof and Hartenbos Formations are tilted northwards, which is indicative of further crustal extension and faulting in the later phase of the break up of Gondwana.

It is considered to be Early Cretaceous in age although more thorough dating needs to be undertaken to confirm this. It provides important geological data on the change in landscape during the break-up of Gondwana in relation to the older Kirkwood Formation which it overlies. The Buffelskloof and Hartenbos Formations are only found in the Western Cape and do not overlie the Sundays River Formation, which may be indicative of an unconformity. The relationship between the Buffelskloof and Hartenbos Formations, and the lower formations of the Uitenhage Group needs further study.

The Buffelskloof Formation mainly comprises reddish conglomerates that are interbedded by quartz-rich sandstone lenses and angular breccias. The conglomerates and sandstones were likely deposited in a high-energy alluvial environment where debris flows from flash floods were common during the rainy season, while the breccias are the remains of scree mountain-slope deposits. The breccias were formed from renewed erosion of the Cape Fold Belt rocks due to the next phase of tectonic activity associated with the breakup of Gondwana.

The reddish coloration of the rocks is due to iron oxide being supplied during deposition of the sedimentary rock. The Hartenbos Formation predominantly comprises sandy mudstone and claystone which were likely deposited in deltaic settings downstream and seaward from the Buffelskloof Formation deposits.

== Paleontology ==
Only fragmented, petrified and semi-petrified fossil wood have been recovered from the Buffelskloof Formation. No fossil remains have been found in the Hartenbos Formation at this time. Poor vertebrate fossil content is typical of high-energy environments that predominantly contain braided river systems. However, due to the similarities between the Buffelsdorp Formation and the older Enon Formation, it is possible that dinosaur teeth and claws could be recovered from this formation in the future.
