= Enon Formation =

Jurassic-Cretaceous geological formation in the Uitenhage Group of South Africa

- Stratigraphic range: Late Jurassic-Early Cretaceous
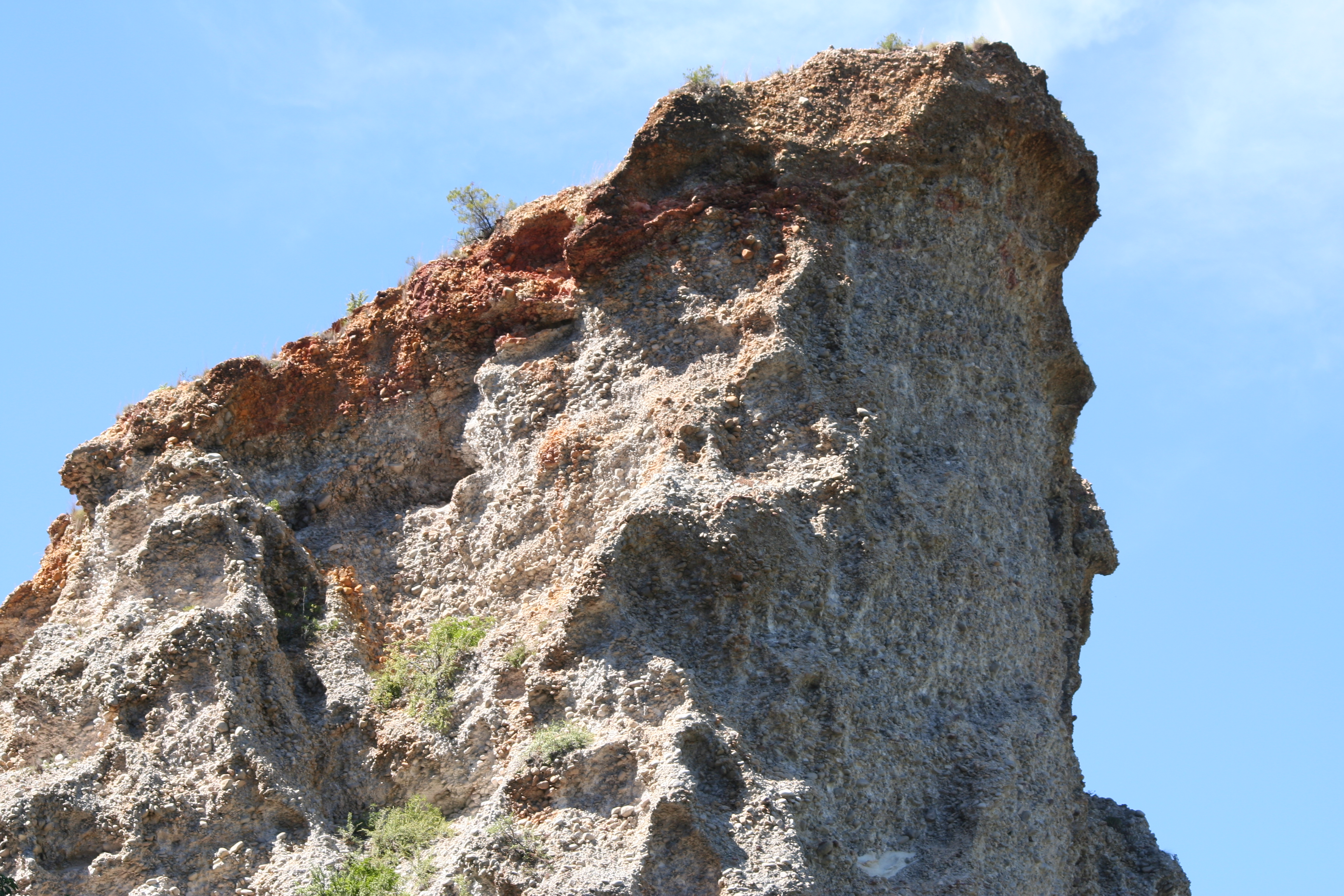
- Enon Formation conglomerate in the Gamtoos valley
- Type: Geological formation
- Unit of: Uitenhage Group
- Underlies: Kirkwood Formation
- Overlies: Cape Fold Belt, Suurberg Group (northern Algoa Basin)
- Thickness: up to 480 m (1,570 ft)

Lithology
- Primary: Conglomerate
- Other: Sandstone

Location
- Coordinates: 33.6°S 22.2°E
- Approximate paleocoordinates: 44.1°S 13.8°W
- Region: Eastern and Western Cape
- Country: South Africa

Type section
- Location: Enon settlement (former mission station, east of Kirkwood), Eastern Cape
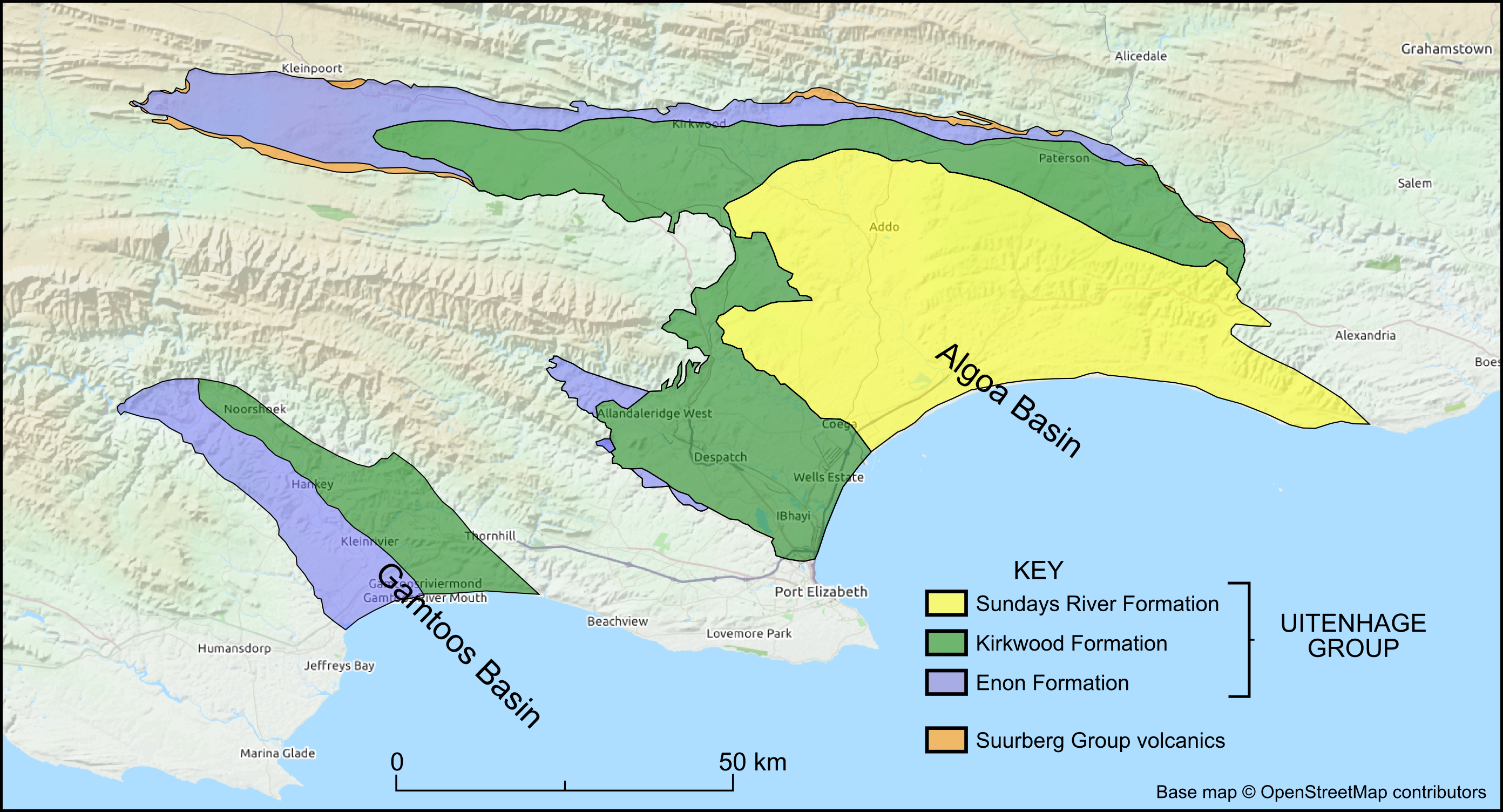
- Map showing extent of the Enon Formation (purple) in the Algoa and Gamtoos Basins

The Enon Formation is a geological formation found in the Eastern and Western Cape provinces in South Africa. It is the lowermost of the four formations found within the Uitenhage Group of the Algoa Basin, its type locality, where it has been measured at a maximum thickness of 480 metres (1,570 ft). Discontinuous outcrops are also found in the Worcester-Pletmos and Oudshoorn-Gamtoos Basins, including isolated occurrences in the Haasvlakte, Jubilee, and Soutpansvlakte Basins near the small town Bredasdorp.

== Geology ==
The Enon Formation was formed along the southern section of South Africa during the break up of Gondwana when there was widespread erosion of rocks comprising the Cape Fold Belt. It is considered to be Late Jurassic to Early Cretaceous in age although more thorough dating needs to be undertaken.

It provides important geological data on the change in landscape during the break-up of Gondwana in relation to the younger and softer formations - the Kirkwood and Sundays River - which overlie it, and because it is the oldest formation of the onshore post-Karoo Mesozoic deposits found in South Africa. Underlying strata are separated by unconformities in most locales expect where the Enon is underlain by deposits of the Cape Fold Belt.

The sedimentary rock of the Enon comprises several different types of coarse, clastic, poorly sorted pebble to cobble thickly-bedded conglomerate deposits. The clasts are usually pale or white quartzite, and the most common matrix is a gypsiferous (sometimes iron-oxide rich) sandy clay. At some places, clasts of various sizes are intermixed, with large amounts of sandy matrix; at others however, water-sorted clasts of similar size occur in layers, separated by infilled sandstone lenses. Groupings within the formation have occasionally been informally identified, such as the basal Enon Sandstones that occur in the Algoa Basin. Much of the formation tends to comprise smaller clasts in a more iron-rich matrix, giving it a more reddish colour.

Conglomerates are the most diagnostic feature of the Enon, so much so in the past the formation was referred to as the Enon Conglomerate Formation. The conglomerates consist of large, sub-rounded to rounded clasts of sheared or unsheared quartzite and sometimes slate, shale, and charcoal. Quartzite clasts are generally more rounded whereas the slate and shale clasts are angular. These are interbedded with subordinate sandstone lenses ranging from white, yellow, red and green in colour, claystones, and rare mudstone units. These were deposited in a high-energy alluvial environment where debris flows were common.

== Current geographic extent ==
Though formerly continuous, the Enon Formation now occurs as several disjunct outcrops in the southern Cape. Along the Worcester-Pletmos Basin, it occurs in patches along the southern flanks of the Langeberg Mountains - from Worcester in the west, as far as Mossel Bay in the east.

In the Breede River valley, the Enon beds are tilted downwards to the south, and occur in three main outcrops. At Worcester it exists as partially-rounded clasts of grit and Witteberg sandstone, cemented in beds of argillaceous, reddish sandstone, and overlaying the Ecca formation. In the Nuy-Vink area, it exists as pale Witteberg sandstone and greenish Ecca shale clasts, cemented in a pale red or greenish (sometimes calcareous) mudstone, overlaying the Ecca Group and the Dwyka. Between Robertson and Ashton, it exists mainly as micaceous or quartzitic Witteberg sandstone clasts, in a reddish-brown matrix, overlaying Witteberg Group rocks. This outcrop surrounds the fine, pale, greyish Kirkwood Formation sandstones of the Klaasvoogdsrivier area. The eastern part of this Enon outcrop, near Ashton, contains clasts of Dwyka tillite, fine greenish sandstone and shale pebbles.

In the Overberg region, the Enon Formation occurs in several more outcrops. At Swellendam, it exists as Bokkeveld shale and micaceous Witteberg sandstone clasts, in a reddish-green sandy clay matrix. Between Heidelberg and Riversdale, it exists mainly as a curved band surrounding the southern edge of the larger Kirkwood Formation. Near Heidelberg, the Enon is composed of greenish Bokkeveld shale clasts and vein quartz. Nearer Riversdale, Witteberg sandstone clasts are also present.

At Herbertsdale, a large section is exposed, often interfingered with the neighbouring Kirkwood Formation. The southern portion of the Enon is composed mainly of angular Bokkeveld shale clasts in a pale reddish-grey matrix. The rock just south of the Hartebeeskuil dam however, is composed more of partially silicified sandstone and quartzite clasts. At Mossel Bay, the Enon outcrops are often also composed of sandstone and quartzite clasts.

Along the Oudshoorn-Gamtoos Basin, it occurs south of the Swartberg mountain range - around Oudtshoorn and eastwards.

A large but highly eroded outcrop also occurs in the Soutpansvlakte Basin, in the Waterskilpad river area, north east of Bredasdorp. The far western portion of this conglomerate is composed of Bokkeveld (60%) and Table Mountain sandstone (40%) clasts. The more northern parts have far more intercalated sandstone and mudstone, with clasts originating from the central Ruens Bokkeveld deposits. The clasts of the southern parts are predominantly from the surrounding Bredasdorp mountains and Bokkeveld rocks. To the east, an isolated bed in the Soutrivier valley is composed almost entirely of disc-shaped shale and siltstone clasts (with occasional vein quartz rocks).

Other outcrops occur in smaller, isolated basins south of Soetendalsvlei at Jubilee, where pale red and grey conglomerates, mudstones, sandstones and tuffaceous rocks support occasional silcrete caps, as well as at Haasvlakte. Laterally, the limits of the Enon conglomerate beds often interfinger or transition gradually into the softer sands and mudstones of the Kirkwood Formation. Outcroups are also known from the Breede River Valley.

== Paleontology ==
Some silicified wood, charcoal fragments, abraded bone fragments, and two theropod dinosaur teeth, have been recovered from the Enon Formation at the Oudtshoorn theropod site. However, fossil preservation is extremely poor.
