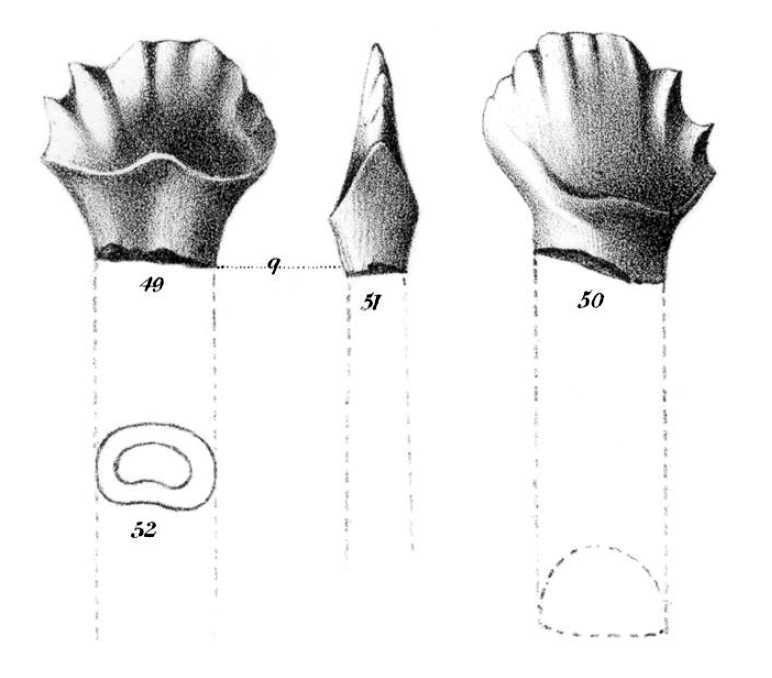
- Palaeoscincus costatus holotype tooth

Scientific classification
- Kingdom: Animalia
- Phylum: Chordata
- Class: Reptilia
- Clade: Dinosauria
- Clade: †Ornithischia
- Clade: †Thyreophora
- Clade: †Ankylosauria
- Family: †Nodosauridae
- Genus: †Palaeoscincus; Leidy, 1856

Type species
- Palaeoscincus costatus Leidy, 1856

= Palaeoscincus =

Palaeoscincus Temporal range: Late Cretaceous, 79–74.9 Ma

Extinct genus of dinosaurs

Palaeoscincus (meaning "ancient lizard" from Greek: παλαιός palaios and Greek: σκίγγος skinkos) is a dubious genus of ankylosaurian dinosaur based on teeth from the mid-late Campanian-age Upper Cretaceous Judith River Formation of Montana. Like several other dinosaur genera named by Joseph Leidy (Deinodon, Thespesius, and Trachodon), it is an historically important genus with a convoluted taxonomy that has been all but abandoned by modern dinosaur paleontologists. Because of its wide use in the early 20th century, it was somewhat well known to the general public, often through illustrations of an animal with the armor of Edmontonia and the tail club of an ankylosaurid.

== Reassigned species ==
Seven species have been referred to this genus over the years, six of which have since been reassigned to other genera:

- Palaeoscincus africanus, named by Robert Broom in 1910/1912, a partial jaw from the Tithonian-Valanginian-age Upper Jurassic-Lower Cretaceous Kirkwood Formation of South Africa, now known as the stegosaurid Paranthodon;
- Palaeoscincus asper, "the rough one", a dubious tooth taxon from the late Campanian-age Upper Cretaceous Dinosaur Park Formation of Alberta, Canada, named by Lawrence Morris Lambe in 1902, based on a single tooth, specimen NMC 1349 now referred to Euoplocephalus;
- Palaeoscincus costatus, "the ribbed one", the type species named by Leidy in 1856, known from a single tooth, specimen ANSP 9263 found by Ferdinand Vandeveer Hayden near Fort Benton. It was the first ankylosaurian species to be named based on American material; it is now considered an ankylosaurian of unknown affinities.
- Palaeoscincus latus, "the wide one" named by Othniel Charles Marsh in 1892, from the late Maastrichtian-age Upper Cretaceous Lance Formation of Wyoming, also based on a single tooth, specimen YPM 4810 found in Niobrara County, Wyoming, now believed to have come from a pachycephalosaurid;
- "P. magoder", a nomen nudum name from a faunal list by Karl ("Charles") L. Henning, the result of mistaking the German words mag oder for a specific name;
- Palaeoscincus rugosidens, "rough tooth" named by Charles Whitney Gilmore in 1930, the best-known species, a skull and partial skeleton from the late Campanian-age Two Medicine Formation of Montana, now known as Edmontonia rugosidens, or a separate genus Chassternbergia. It was this species that was portrayed in most restorations of the genus.
- Palaeoscincus tutus, a renaming of Euoplocephalus tutus by Edwin Hennig in 1915.

Today, the type species P. costatus and thereby the genus is considered to be an indeterminate ankylosaurian, perhaps an indeterminate nodosaurid.

== See also ==
- Timeline of ankylosaur research
