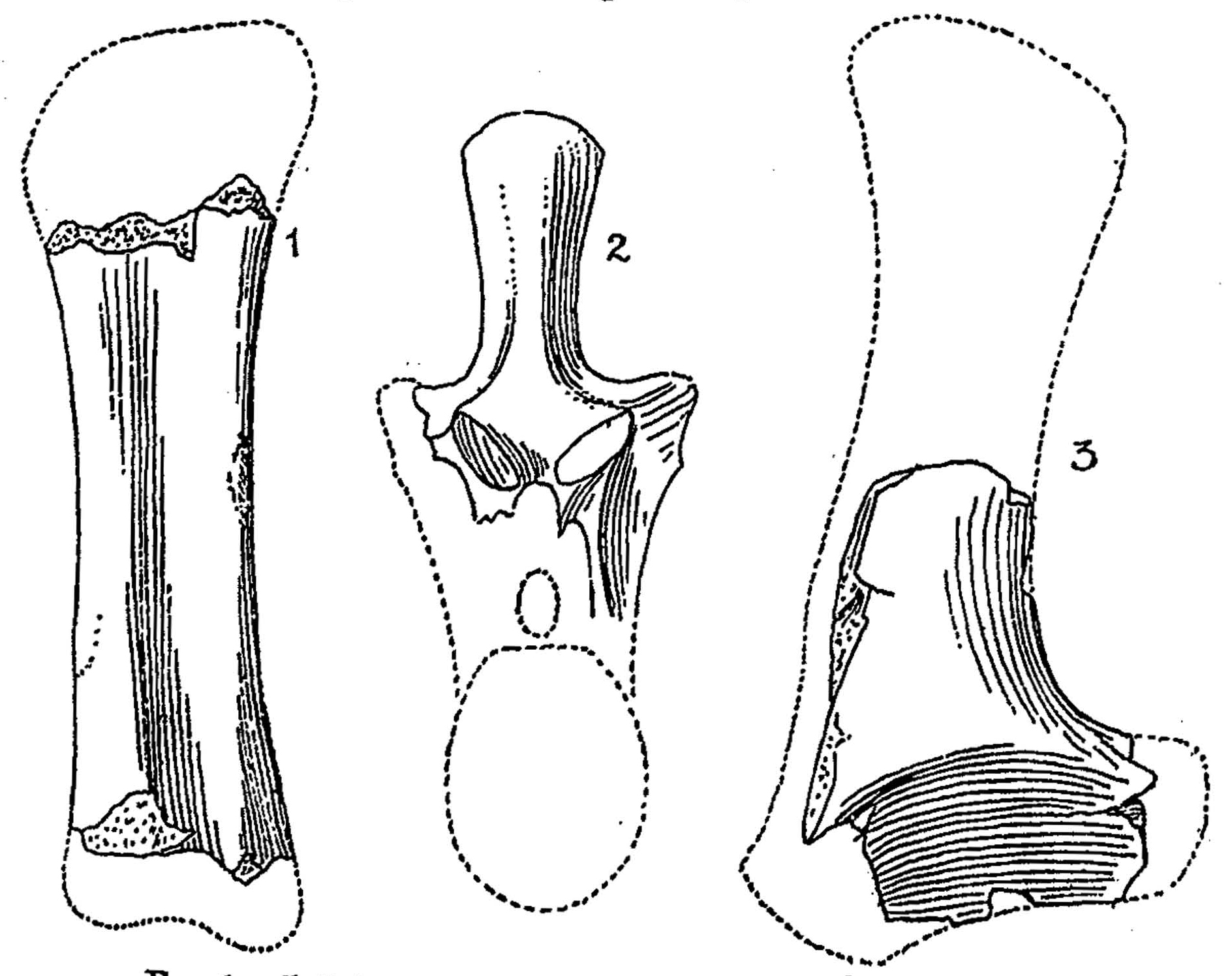
- Femur, vertebra and scapula (holotype)

Scientific classification
- Kingdom: Animalia
- Phylum: Chordata
- Class: Reptilia
- Clade: Dinosauria
- Clade: Saurischia
- Clade: †Sauropodomorpha
- Clade: †Sauropoda
- Clade: †Neosauropoda
- Genus: †Algoasaurus; Broom, 1904
- Species: †A. bauri

Binomial name
- †Algoasaurus bauri Broom, 1904

= Algoasaurus =

Algoasaurus Temporal range: Early Cretaceous, 140–125 Ma

Extinct genus of dinosaurs

Algoasaurus (/ælˌɡoʊ.əˈsɔːrəs/; "Algoa Bay reptile") is a genus of sauropod dinosaur from the Early Cretaceous (Berriasian to early Valanginian ages) Upper Kirkwood Formation of Cape Province, South Africa, specifically near a town called Despatch. Only one species, A. bauri, is known.

== Discovery and naming ==
The holotype, a cervical vertebra, femur, an ungual phalanx and a scapula, was recovered in 1903 from a quarry in Despatch, Eastern Cape which exposed part of the Upper Kirkwood Formation by workmen who did not recognize them as dinosaur specimens, so many of the bones, probably including the rest of the once near-complete holotype, were made into bricks and thus destroyed; it is possible that bricks in the Nelson Mandela Bay Metropolitan Municipality may still contain parts of the Algoasaurus holotype. According to Broom (1904), the Port Elizabeth Museum collected "a few fragments of vertebrae and ribs" during another attempt to collect any remaining bones at the site.

The type species, A. bauri, was named by Robert Broom in 1904 and he likened Algoasaurus to Brontosaurus and Diplodocus. Broom gave much of his fossil collection to the American Museum of Natural History in 1913, including the ungual phalanx from the holotype, listed as specimen AMNH FR 5631.

Canudo & Salgado (2003) and Ibiricu et al. (2012) both considered Algoasaurus to have belonged to Rebbachisauridae based on the shape of the neural arch of the cervical vertebra, but MacPhee et al. (2016) disagreed with the rebbachisaurid affinities of Algoasaurus, stating that, although the shape of the vertebra suggests Algoasaurus belonged to Rebbachisauridae, the shape of the scapula says otherwise, so they could not identify Algoasaurus further than Eusauropoda and they also could not locate the rest of the holotype, although they did find specimen SAM-PK-K1500 in the collections of the Iziko Museum in Cape Town to possibly be the lost caudal vertebra pertaining to the holotype or possibly another specimen of Algoasaurus unrelated to the holotype, but SAM-PK-K1500 is yet to be described in detail, so it can not yet be confidently assigned to any genus.

== Description ==
The animal may have been around 9 m (30 ft) long when it died, although this can not be confirmed as the holotype is very fragmentary. Before it was lost, the femur was estimated to have been up to 50 centimetres (20 in) when complete.

== Classification ==
Algoasaurus was a eusauropod; although it has often been assigned to the Titanosauridae, there is no evidence for this, and recent reviews have considered it to be an indeterminate sauropod. It was then believed to have been a member of Rebbachisauridae until it was reclassified in 2016 as an indeterminate eusauropod.

== Paleoenvironment ==
Sedimentological analysis of the holotype assemblage suggests it came from a horizon transitioning into a drier climate. Other animals from the Kirkwood Formation include the iguanodontian Iyuku, the stegosaur Paranthodon, the ornithomimosaur Nqwebasaurus, and several other unnamed dinosaurs.
