= Uitenhage Group =

Geological group of post-Karoo Mesozoic rocks in South Africa

- Stratigraphic range: Late Early Jurassic-Early Cretaceous; ~183–100 Ma
- Type: Geologic group
- Sub-units: Enon, Kirkwood, Sundays River & Buffelskloof Formations
- Underlies: Algoa Group
- Overlies: Suurberg Group

Lithology
- Primary: Sandstone, mudstone, siltstone, shale, conglomerate
- Other: Calcite

Location
- Region: Western & Eastern Cape
- Country: South Africa

Type section
- Named for: Uitenhage area
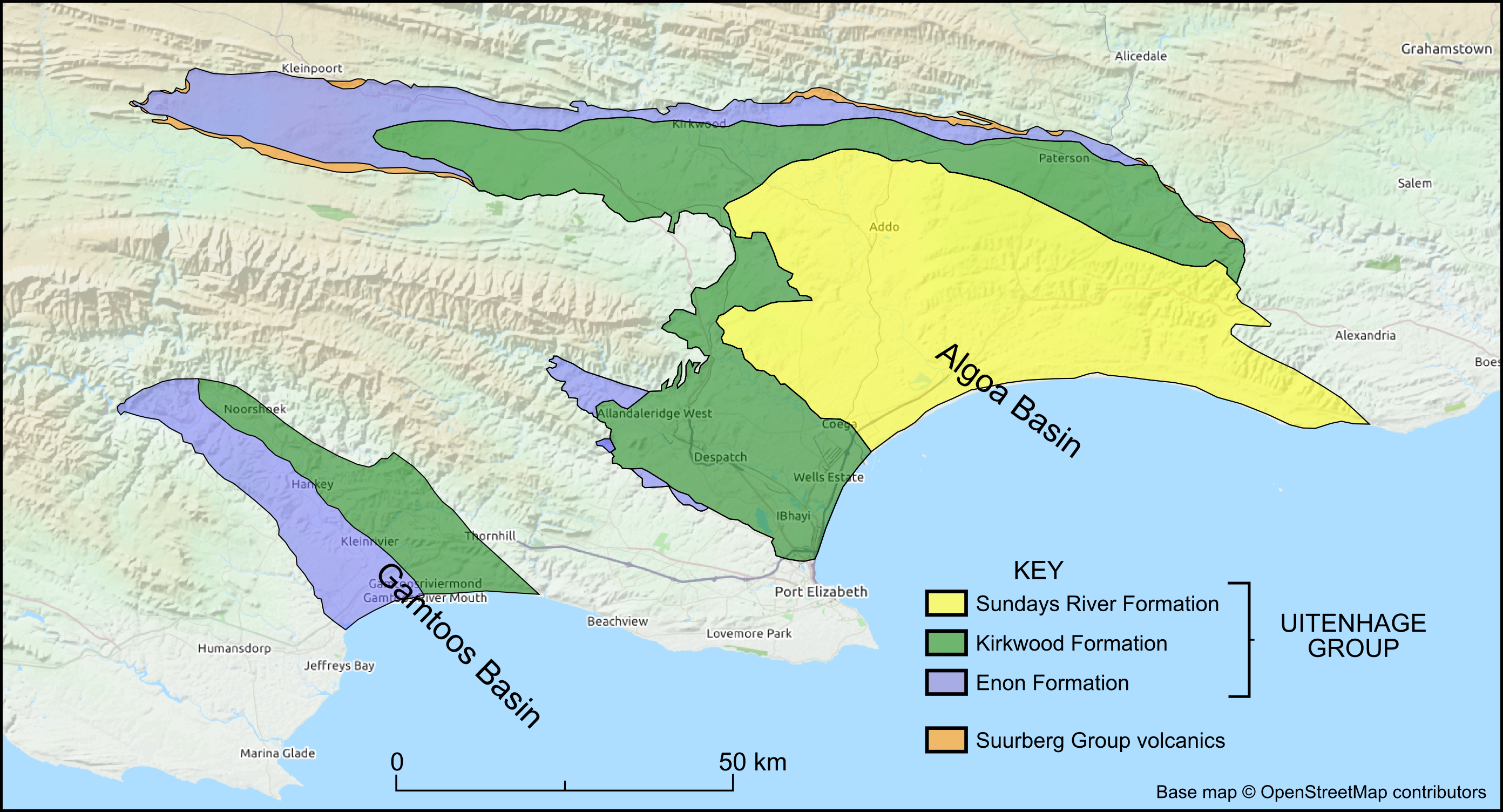
- Map showing extent of the Uitenhage Group in the Algoa and Gamtoos Basins

The Uitenhage Group is one of three geological groups, which comprise the onshore and offshore post-Karoo middle to lower Upper Mesozoic geological rock units in South Africa. Stratigraphically, the Uitenhage Group overlies the Suurberg Group and is overlain by the Algoa Group. It contains four formations that range in age from late Early Jurassic and late Early Cretaceous in age (~183 - 100 Ma).

== Geographic extent ==
In the onshore part of the southern Cape, deposits of the Uitenhage Group occur predominantly in the Algoa and Gamtoos Basins, which are situated north/north-west of Port Elizabeth in the Eastern Cape, South Africa. Smaller deposits also occur in the Baviaanskloof, Georginda, Vlakteplaas, Oudtshoorn, Plettenberg Bay, Knysna, Herbertsdale-Mossel Bay, Heidelberg-Riversdale, Swellendam, and Worcester-Robertson Basins. These are grabens and half-grabens (rift basins) that opened up due to mainly normal faulting processes during the break-up of Gondwana.

== Stratigraphic units ==
Stratigraphic units in this group include (from oldest to youngest):

- Enon Formation: Contains subordinate sandstones and different types of thickly-bedded conglomerates, which consist mainly of quartzite and sometimes slate, shale, and charcoal. The clasts are poorly-sorted, sub-rounded to rounded pebbles and cobbles. Deposition occurred mainly in high-energy alluvial environments (e.g., alluvial fans, low sinuosity rivers).
- Kirkwood Formation: Contains mainly medium-grained sandstone that is locally charcoal-rich, sporadic conglomerates, and variegated mudstone. Out of the three formations of the Uitenhage Group, the Kirkwood is the most well-studied, and is extremely fossil-rich. Deposition occurred under mainly fluvial conditions at or near sea level.
- Sundays River Formation: Contains fine- to medium-grained grey sandstones, siltstones, and mudstones. The sandstone layers are frequently cemented with calcite and contain shell fragments. The Sundays River is also highly fossiliferous. Deposition occurred under shallow marine and estuarine conditions.
- Buffelskloof Formation: Deposited in a high energy braided river system with conglomerate deposits, similar to that of the Enon Formation. Some fossil material such as petrified wood and scant remains of fossil dinosaur teeth and claws have been recovered. In the Herbertsdale/Mossel Bay Basin this formation, with the overlying Hartenbos Formation, forms the lateral equivalent of the Sundays River Formation.

== Paleontology ==
Fossils are especially common in the Kirkwood and Sundays River Formations, although regarding the Sundays River Formation the most common fossils are of invertebrates. Past expeditions within the Kirkwood Formation have uncovered several dis-articulated remains of theropod, sauropod, and ornithopod dinosaurs, and a plesiosaur fossil is known from the Sundays River Formation. Fossil remains of amphibians, lizards, fishes, and small mammals have also been recovered. A variety of bivalve, gastropod, ammonites, and ostracods are likewise known from these deposits. The fossil flora is equally diverse and silicified tree trunks - some with evidence of being charred by fire - have also been found.
