= Iyuku =

Iyuku Temporal range: Early Cretaceous, Valanginian

Scientific classification
- Domain: Eukaryota
- Kingdom: Animalia
- Phylum: Chordata
- Clade: Dinosauria
- Clade: †Ornithischia
- Clade: †Ornithopoda
- Clade: †Iguanodontia
- Genus: †Iyuku; Forster et al., 2022

Type species
- †Iyuku raathi Forster et al., 2022

Extinct genus of iguanodontian

Iyuku (meaning "hatchling", pronounced "eye-yoo-koo") is a genus of iguanodontian dinosaur from the Early Cretaceous Kirkwood Formation of South Africa. The type species is Iyuku raathi.

== Discovery and naming ==
Iykuku is known from a bonebed mostly containing the remains of at least 27 (inferred from non-overlapping parts of the left femora) juvenile and hatchling individuals, an occurrence never before reported. These bonebeds were excavated during three expeditions between 1995 and 1999. The remains were known as the "Kirkwood taxon" since at least 2012, until the remains were determined to represent a new genus and species in 2022, named Iyuku raathi. The holotype specimen, AM 6067, consists of an incomplete, semi-articulated skeleton, including a partial skull, vertebrae, scapulae, pelvic girdle, both legs, and ribs. The generic name "Iyuku", is derived from the Xhosa word for "hatchling", in reference to the immature status of the specimens. The specific name, "raathi", honors South African paleontologist Mike Raath.

== Classification ==
The describers assigned Iyuku to the Iguanodontia. A 2015 PhD dissertation that included the then unnamed species in a cladistic analysis found it to be a member of the basal iguanodontian family Dryosauridae, with the parsimony analysis recovering Iyuku and Dysalotosaurus as sister taxa. Forster et al. (2022) referenced this study but noted that the early ontogenetic stage of most of the material of Iyuku presents a major problem in placing it into a phylogenetic analysis and assigned it to Iguanodontia without providing an analysis. Subsequently, four phylogenetic analyses conducted by Poole (2022) recovered Iyuku as the sister taxon to Dysalotosaurus within Dryosauridae. The cladogram below displays the results of a phylogenetic analysis by Poole (2022):

- Iguanodontia
  - Gasparinisaura
  - - Leaellynasaura
    - - Macrogryphosaurus
      - - - Talenkauen
          - Valdosaurus
        - - Anabisetia
          - - Trinisaura
            - Kangnasaurus
            - - Rhabdodontoidea
              - Dryomorpha
                - Dryosauridae
                  - Dryosaurus
                  - - Dysalotosaurus
                    - Iyuku
                - - Ankylopollexia

== Paleobiology ==
Fossil material from Iyuku represents at least four size classes, including three juvenile phases of growth (with the smallest likely representing the post-hatching stage) and the fourth, larger stage, likely a subadult. Two different estimates of total length were provided for an incomplete tibia of a subadult specimen collected from an unknown location in the Kirkwood cliffs: either 35 cm (14 in) or at least 42 cm (17 in) long, i.e., four or five times the length of the largest juvenile tibia from the quarry site. Fossil material from the quarry site includes mostly isolated bones (with only five instances of articulation) of hatchling to juvenile individuals of varying size in a 20–30 cm thick horizon, preserved with no apparent preferred orientation of long bones.

Forster et al. (2022) noted the similarity of this finding to the reported preservation of the juvenile remains of Orodromeus, Maiasaura, and Hypacrosaurus, which might represent aggradations of mortality near nesting sites. Although the remains of Iyuku were not found in association with nests or eggshells, Forster et al. (2022) considered it possible that the concentrations of young individuals of this species represent seasonal attrition at or near a nesting site, with the scattering of bones likely caused by trampling prior to burial or bioturbation shortly after interment. Bone histology of multiple young individuals reveals rest lines indicative of temporary arrests in bone deposition, hypothesized by Forster et al. (2022) as caused by repeated, possibly environmentally induced stress during the early stages of ontogeny in these individuals, such as dry and drought-like conditions and/or repeated periods of extreme heat.

== Paleoenvironment ==
Sedimentological analysis of the holotype assemblage suggests it came from a horizon transitioning into a drier climate. Other animals from the Kirkwood Formation include the sauropod Algoasaurus, the stegosaur Paranthodon, the ornithomimosaur Nqwebasaurus, and several other unnamed dinosaurs.
