= Algoa Basin =

Sedimentary basin offshore of Algoa Bay in South Africa

Algoa Basin is a sedimentary basin offshore Algoa Bay in South Africa. The basin depression is a rift currently filled with sediments of Lower Cretaceous age. Kirkwood Formation makes up part of the fill of Algoa Basin.
