= Sundays River Formation =

Geological formation in the Uitenhage Group of the Algoa Basin in South Africa

- Stratigraphic range: Valanginian-Hauterivian; ~137–131 Ma
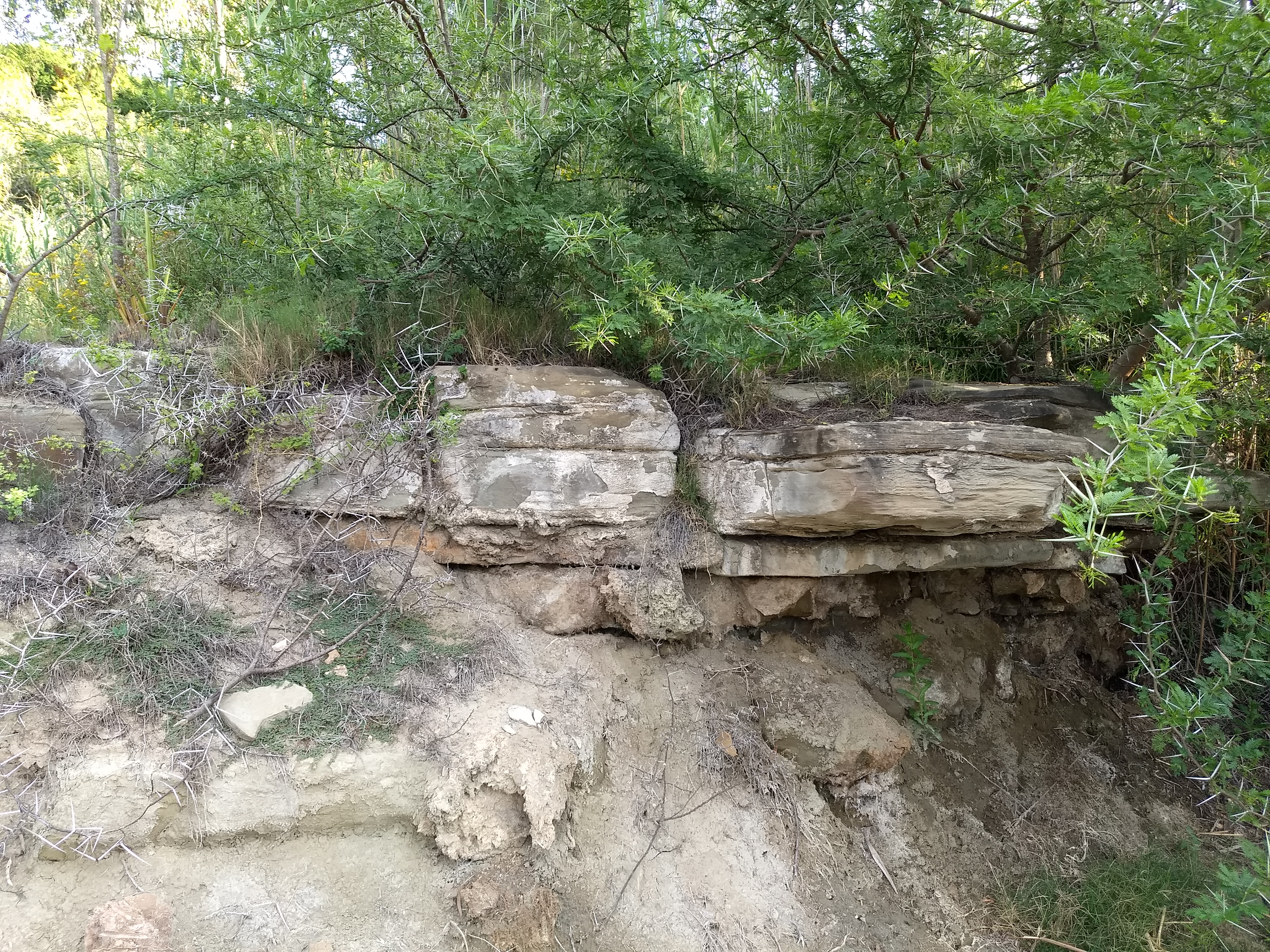
- Sandstone layer overlying siltstone/mudstone
- Type: Geological formation
- Unit of: Uitenhage Group
- Underlies: Algoa Group
- Overlies: Kirkwood Formation
- Thickness: Up to 2,000 m (6,600 ft)

Lithology
- Primary: Sandstone, claystone
- Other: Siltstone, mudstone

Location
- Coordinates: 33.6°S 25.6°E
- Approximate paleocoordinates: 45.1°S 11.5°W
- Region: Eastern & Western Cape
- Country: South Africa

Type section
- Named for: Sundays River
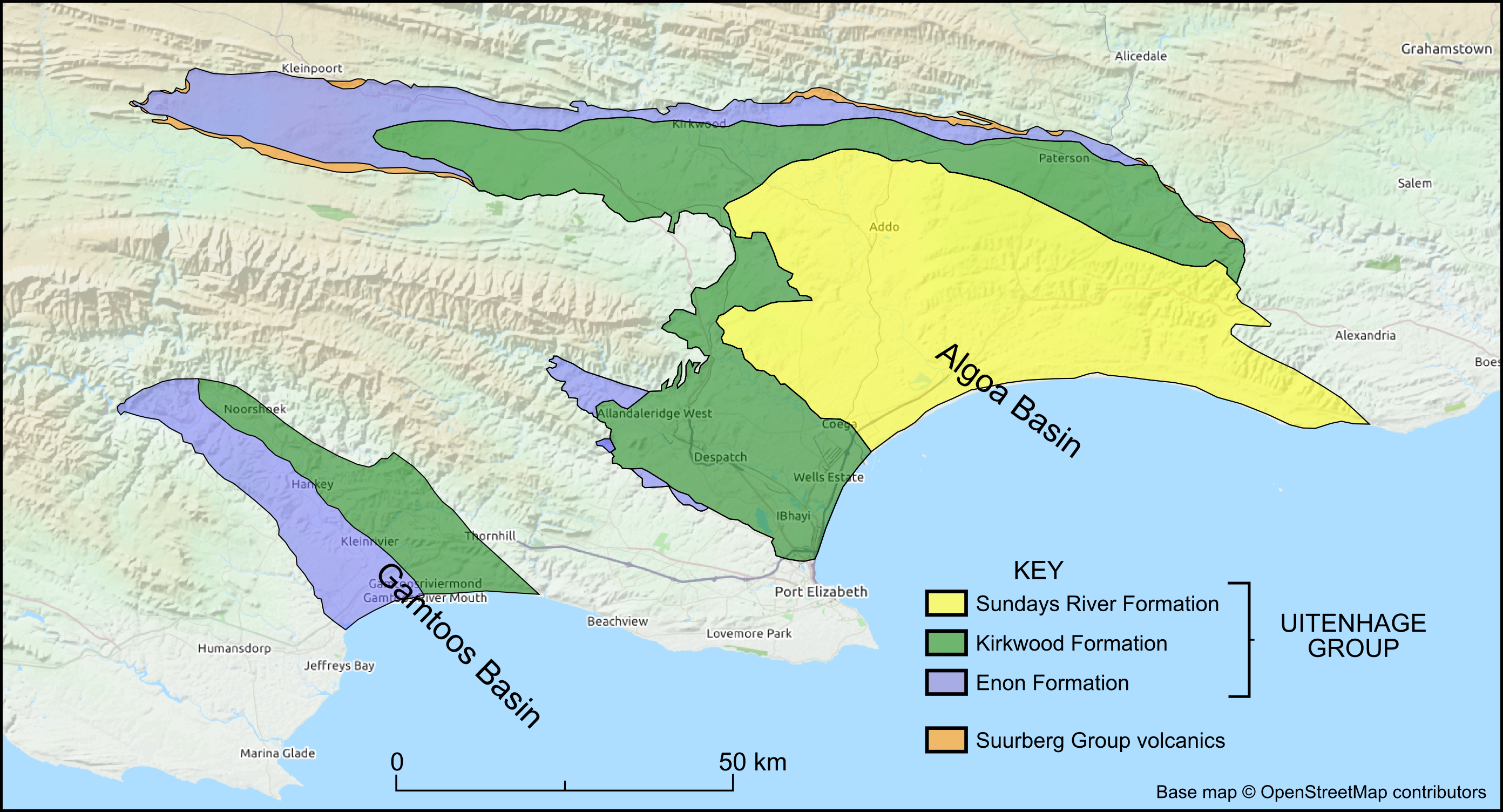
- Map showing extent of the Sundays River Formation in the Algoa Basin

The Sundays River Formation is a geological formation found in the Eastern and Western Cape provinces in South Africa. It is the second youngest of the four formations found within the Uitenhage Group of the Algoa Basin, its type locality, and the only location where outcrops have been located. The Sundays River has been measured at a maximum thickness of 2,000 metres (6,600 ft).

== Geology ==
The Sundays River Formation overlies the Kirkwood Formation which it grades laterally into in certain areas, meaning that they correlate in age in some localities. The sedimentary rock of the Sundays River comprises mainly fine to medium grained grey sandstones which often contain shell fragments, siltstones, and mudstones. The sandstone layers are frequently cemented with calcite layers. These were deposited in a shallow marine environment which likely included estuarine and lagoonal settings.

== Paleontology ==
The Sundays River is highly fossiliferous and a variety of fossil flora and fauna have been discovered. Invertebrate shells from ammonites, bivalves, and microfossils such as species of forams and ostracods are commonly found cemented within the calcite layers in the sandstone deposits. Trace fossils of gastropod tracks which are infilled with siltstone are also frequently found. Some vertebrate fossils have been found, most notably a near-complete skeleton of a marine plesiosaur, Leptocleidus capensis. However, very little study has been done on the plesiosaur specimen discovered here. Plant remains and non-diagnostic vertebrate fossils have also been recovered.

== Fossil content ==
Color key: Taxon / Reclassified taxon / Taxon falsely reported as present / Dubious taxon or junior synonym / Ichnotaxon / Ootaxon / Morphotaxon	Notes; Uncertain or tentative taxa are in small text; ~~crossed out~~ taxa are discredited.

=== Plesiosaurs ===
Plesiosaurs of the Sundays River Formation
Genus	Species	Location	Stratigraphic position	Material	Notes	Images
Leptocleidus	L. capensis				A leptocleidid plesiosaur	
