= Kirkwood Formation =

Cretaceous geological formation in the Uitenhage Group

- Stratigraphic range: Berriasian-Hauterivian; ~140–130 Ma
- Type: Geological formation
- Unit of: Uitenhage Group
- Sub-units: Swartkops Member, Colchester Member, Bethelsdorp Member, Wood beds
- Underlies: Sundays River Formation, Buffelskloof Formation
- Overlies: Enon Formation
- Thickness: up to 2,210 m (7,250 ft)

Lithology
- Primary: Sandstone, claystone
- Other: Mudstone, siltstone

Location
- Coordinates: 33.4°S 25.5°E
- Approximate paleocoordinates: 45.0°S 11.5°W
- Region: Western & Eastern Cape
- Country: South Africa

Type section
- Named for: Kirkwood, Eastern Cape
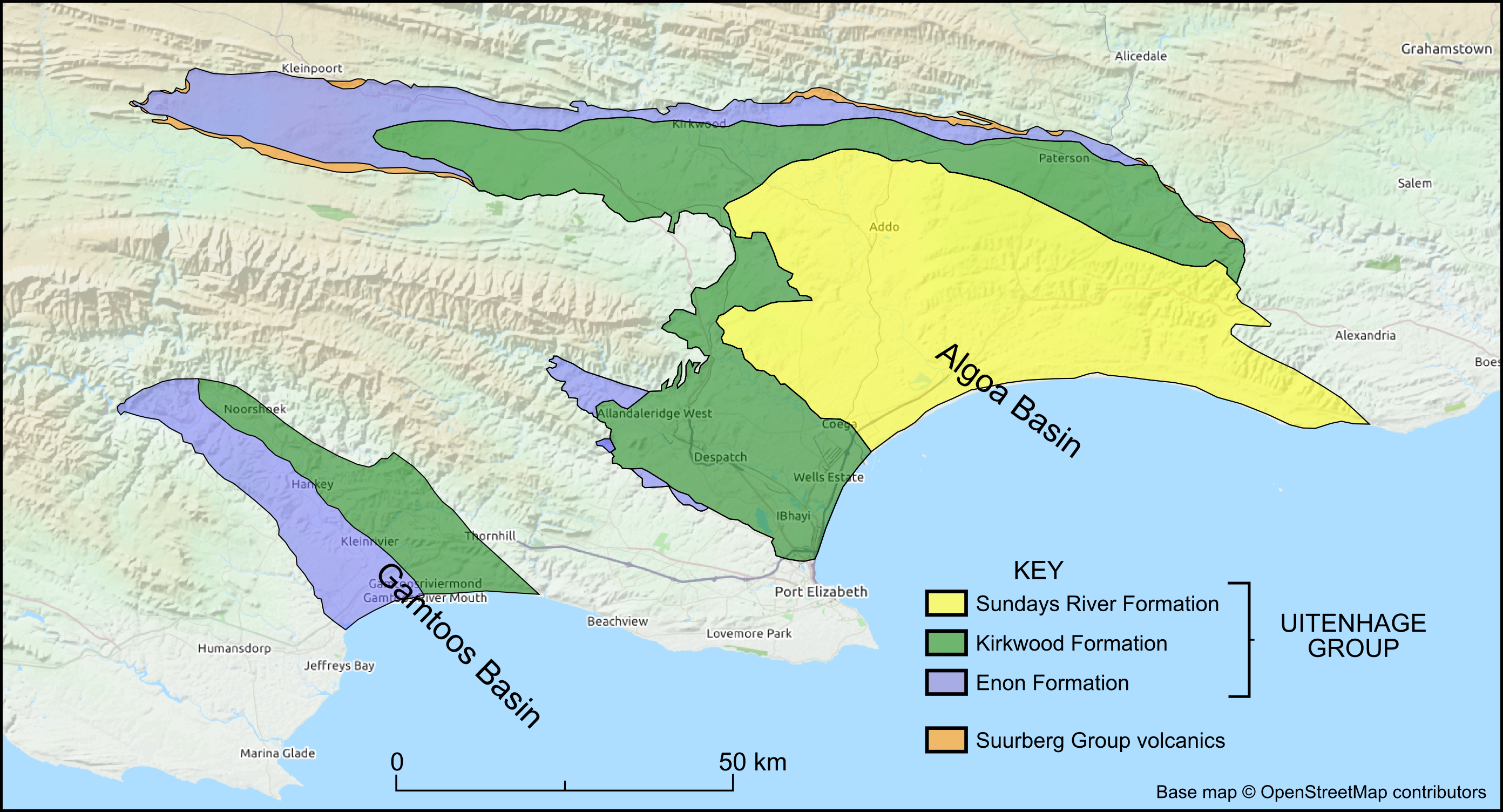
- Map showing extent of the Kirkwood Formation (green) in the Algoa and Gamtoos Basins

The Kirkwood Formation is a geological formation found in the Eastern and Western Cape provinces in South Africa. It is one of the four formations found within the Uitenhage Group of the Algoa Basin – its type locality – and in the neighbouring Gamtoos Basin. Outcrops of the Kirkwood are also found along the Worcester-Pletmos, Herbertsdale-Riversdale, Heidelberg-Mossel Bay, and Oudtshoorn-Gamtoos basin lines. At these basins the Kirkwood Formation underlies the Buffelskloof Formation and not the Sundays River Formation.

== Geology ==
The Kirwood Formation was formed along the southern section of South Africa during the break up of Gondwana. Dating it has proven tricky, with some regarding it as a Late Jurassic (~145 Ma) or Early Cretaceous deposit (~135 Ma). However, dating the Kirkwood's abundant volcanic ash layers by U-Pb methods is currently underway.

The Kirkwood Formation is composed of sedimentary rocks deposited under fluvial conditions at or near sea level, such as variegated mudstone (an iconic feature), medium-grained lithic sandstone (often being charcoal-rich), and sporadic conglomerates. At its base, the Kirkwood Formation includes a significant deposit of fine-to-medium grained, poorly-sorted (often quartzitic) estuarine sandstone with subordinate dark grey to brow shale layers. This deposit was described as the Swartkops Member. The lower portion of the remainder of the Formation is composed predominantly of siltstones, but includes a smaller sandstone layer (described as part of the Bethelsdorp Member). The upper portion of the Formation is composed predominantly of fine, clay-rich mudstones, with multiple smaller layers of estuarine sandstone.<

The Kirkwood is the second formation of the Uitenhage Group, positioned between the overlying Sundays River Formation and the underlying Enon Formation. Only three geological members have been described within it: the Swartkops Member which contains estuarine sandstone deposits and lacks fossils. The Colchester Member is the most fossil-rich containing terrestrial and lacustrine fossils and is composed of dark grey shale, siltstones and sandstones. The third, the Bethelsdorp Member, resembles the Colchester in containing dark-grey shales and sandstone, and contains marine microfossils. The upper section of the member is overlain by mudstone and siltstone.

== Paleontology ==
Fragmentary remains of various reptile, frog, insect, and mammal fossils have also been found, including fish scales and freshwater bivalves. In addition several plant species such as bryophytes, ferns, conifers, cycads, and bennettitaleans have been discovered, including silicified fossil tree trunks in the sandstone sections which show evidence of being burned. Amber from possible Araucariaceae tree have been reported.

=== Actinopterygii ===
Fishes of the Kirkwood Formation
Genus	Species	Region	Member	Material	Notes	Image
Holostei indet.	indeterminate	Site 6		Scale fragments	Closely resembling Lepisosteus, but specific placement unknown	
Teleostei indet.	indeterminate	Site 6		Partial tooth	Specific placement unknown	

=== Lepidosaurs ===
Lepidosaurs of the Kirkwood Formation
Genus	Species	Region	Member	Material	Notes	Image
Squamata indet.	indeterminate	Kirkwood Cliffs ‘Lookout’		Braincase	Specific placement unknown	
Sphenodontia indet.	indeterminate	Kirkwood Cliffs ‘Lookout’and Site 6		Palatine and dentary remains	Different from aff. Opisthias sp. from the same formation	
aff. Opisthias sp.	indeterminate	Site 15		Jaw fragment		

=== Testudines ===
Testudines of the Kirkwood Formation
Genus	Species	Region	Member	Material	Notes	Image
Testudinata indet.	indeterminate	Site 6 and Site 16		Shell fragments	Specific placement unknown	

=== Pseudosuchia ===
Pseudosuchians of the Kirkwood Formation
Genus	Species	Region	Member	Material	Notes	Image
Mesosuchia indet.	indeterminate	Site 6 and site 15		Dental remains, incomplete osteoderms and large (72 mm) centrum	Specific placement unknown	

=== Dinosaurs ===
==== Theropods ====
Theropods of the Kirkwood Formation
Genus	Species	Region	Member	Material	Notes	Image
Theropoda indet.	indeterminate	Unknown		Single tooth (MB R2352)	Specific placement unknown, estimated tooth size large as Tyrannosaurus	
Theropoda indet.	indeterminate	Site 6		Dental remains	Much smaller than MB R2352, probably represents other group of small or juvenile theropod	
Tetanurae indet.	indeterminate	Kirkwood Cliffs ‘Lookout’		Proximal femur	Probable basal tetanuran	
Nqwebasaurus	N. thwazi			Almost complete skeleton (AM 6040)	Basalmost Ornithomimosaur	

==== Sauropods ====
Sauropods of the Kirkwood Formation
Genus	Species	Region	Member	Material	Notes	Image
Algoasaurus	A. bauri	Port Elizabeth Brick and Tile Company Quarry		A cervical vertebra, femur, an ungual phalanx and a scapula	Neosauropod with uncertain placement	
Brachiosauridae indet.	indeterminate	Umlilo Game Farm		Vertebrae remains		
Dicraeosauridae indet.	indeterminate	Outskirts of KwaNobuhle Township, 3.3 km south of Uitenhage.		Vertebrate remains		
Diplodocinae indet.	indeterminate	Kirkwood Cliffs ‘Lookout’		Cadual vertebrae		
Eusauropoda indet.	indeterminate	Umlilo Game Farm		Vertebrae remains	Represents either a non-neosauropod eusauropod or a non-titanosauriform macronarian	
Titanosauriformes indet.	indeterminate	Site 15		Dental remains	Initially reported as Camarasauridae, aff.Pleurocoelus sp., and aff. Astrodon sp., but subsequent research suggested taxonomic assignment anything lower than indeterminate titanosauriform not available.	

==== Ornithischians ====
Ornithischians of the Kirkwood Formation
Genus	Species	Region	Member	Material	Notes	Image
Paranthodon	P. africanus	Bushmans River, Woodbury Farm		Partial skull and incomplete vertebra	A Stegosaurid Stegosaur.	
Iyuku	I. raathi	Kirkwood Cliffs ‘Lookout’	Uppermost member	At least 27 individuals, from juveniles and hatchlings.	A Dryosaurid ornithopod.	
