= Algoa Group =

Coastal Cenozoic geological deposits in South Africa

- Stratigraphic range: Middle Eocene-Holocene; ~41–0 Ma
- Type: Geologic group
- Sub-units: Bathurst Formation, Alexandria Formation, Nanaga Formation, Salnova Formation, Nahoon Formation, Schelm Hoek Formation
- Overlies: Table Mountain Group or Uitenhage Group

Lithology
- Primary: Sandstone, calcareous sandstone, limestone, coquina & conglomerates
- Other: Calcite

Location
- Country: South Africa

Type section
- Named for: Algoa area

The Algoa Group is one of five geological groups which comprise the coastal Cenozoic geological deposits in South Africa. The Algoa Group contains six formations which range from Middle Eocene to Late Holocene in age (~41Ma - 100Ka).

== Geographic extent ==
The geological successions of the Algoa Group outcrop from Plettenberg Bay in the Western Cape to East London in the Eastern Cape of South Africa. There are also putative outcrops of Algoa Group rocks further NE in the Port St Johns area. The Algoa Group rocks overlie unconformably and parauncomformably in some areas over much older rocks of the Table Mountain Group in the west and over the Uitenhage Group in the east.

== Stratigraphic units ==
Stratigraphic units in this group include (from oldest to youngest):

- Bathurst Formation: Predominantly marine limestone beds. These are overlain by pebbly coquina conglomerates which often contain shark teeth. Silcrete clasts are found in some outcrops.
- Alexandria Formation: Comprises basal conglomerates of oyster shell "hash" which are overlain by marine shell coquina, coquinite, thin conglomeratic facies containing pebbles from eroded Table Mountain Group quartzite, and calcareous sandstone. The sandstones are predominantly found in the upper sections and exhibit either horizontal bedding, planar, or trough cross-bedding. The sandstones, depending on the bedding type, were deposited in either shoreface, foreshore, infralittoral or estuarine environments. Marine invertebrate fossils and trace fossils are common in this formation.
- Nanaga Formation: Comprises semi-consolidated, cross-bedded sandstones. Calcrete layers containing rhizoliths, and reddish, clay-rich soils are also found. These were deposited in coastal paleo-dunes. In some areas this formation is known to unconformably overlie the Bathurst Formation instead of the Alexandria Formation.
- Salnova Formation: Similar to the Alexandria Formation although the calcareous sandstone layers are only semi-consolidated and are found in its lower sections. The opposite is true in the Alexandria Formation where sandstone dominates its upper sections. These sandstones are overlain by poorly sorted pebbly to bouldery conglomerates and pebbly coquina. Shoreline beach sands and fine-grained shallow marine and estuarine facies deposits are also found. Gastropod, bivalve, echinoid, and crustacean fossils are frequently found in these facies. Informational coquinia clasts are found throughout. This formation was likely deposited in an intertidal setting where several marine transgressions took place over a couple million years.
- Nahoon Formation: Contains consolidated, buff-coloured calcareous aeolianites that often exhibit cross-bedding, thin calcrete horizons, peat layers, and paleosols. These usually overlie a wave-plane surface that sometimes unconformably overlies rocks of either the Uitenhage Group or the Cape Supergroup. Shells of terrestrial land snail species are frequently found in these deposits. Vertebrate trackways have also been found, most notably those of modern humans. Middle Stone Age quartzite stone tools and flakes have been found in this formation as well.
- Schelm Hoek Formation: Comprises mainly unconsolidated modern aeolian sand. The sands are part of currently active dune fields that reach approximately 6 km inland from the coast. Late Stone Age shell middens are often found in the dunes, containing predominantly white sand mussel shells (Donax sera). However, the remains of marine and terrestrial mammals, stone and bone artifacts, and occasional pottery pieces are also found.

== Paleontology and archaeology ==
Fossils are more frequently found in the older formations, although the Alexandria and Salnova formations are the most fossil rich. The most common fossils are of invertebrates, namely of marine gastropods and bivalves, and trace fossils left such as of burrows left by invertebrates. Vertebrate trackways of birds and modern humans are known from the Nahoon Formation.

The Nahoon and Schelm Hoek Formations are known for their archeological artefacts, including modern human trackways in the case of the Nahoon Formation. Both these formations have yielded stone tools. Shell middens and evidence of for small, coastal human settlements are known from the Schelm Hoek Formation.
