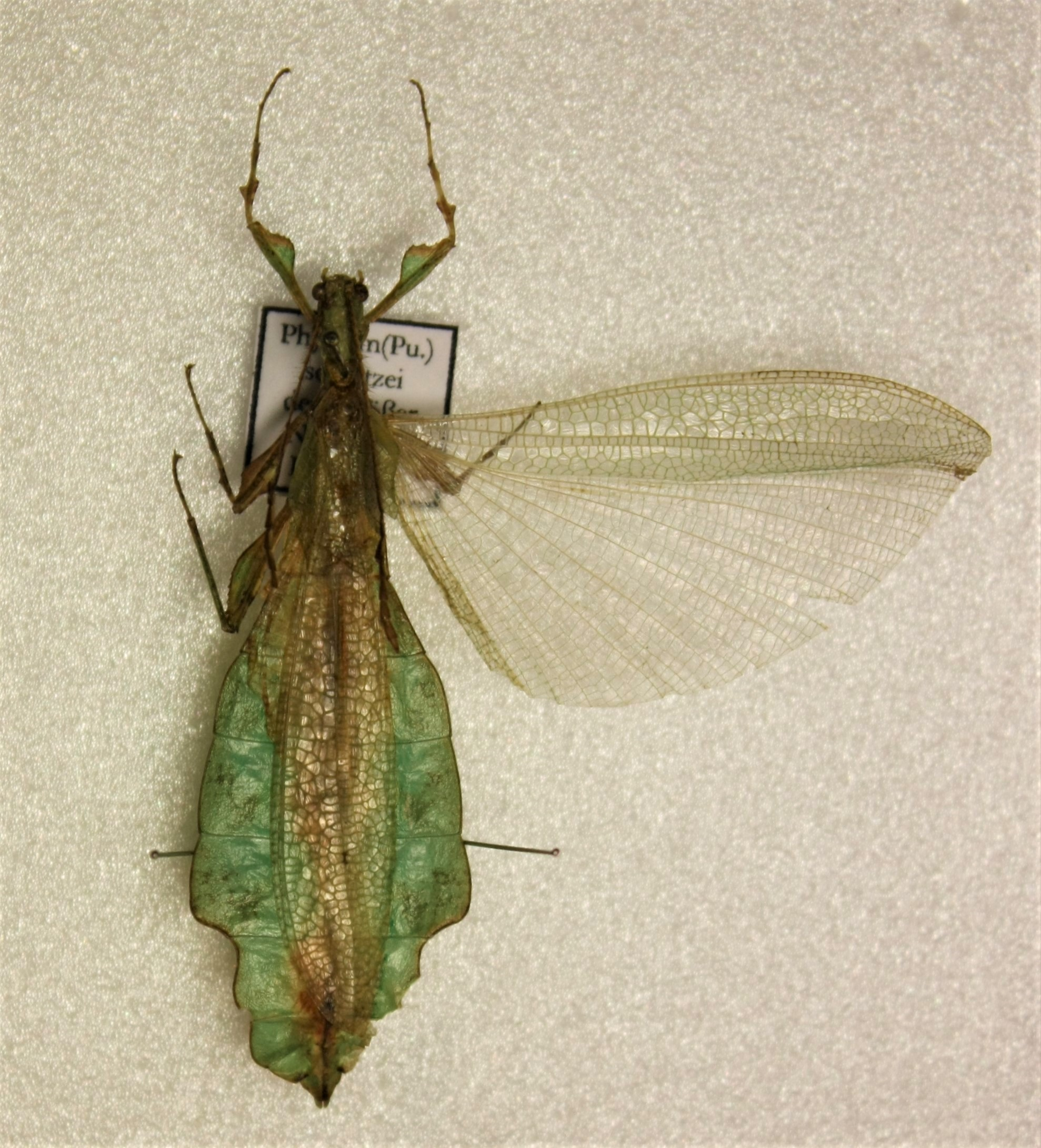
- Male of Rakaphyllium schultzei from the collection of Detlef Größer

Scientific classification
- Kingdom: Animalia
- Phylum: Arthropoda
- Clade: Pancrustacea
- Class: Insecta
- Order: Phasmatodea
- Superfamily: Phyllioidea
- Family: Phylliidae
- Tribe: Phylliini
- Genus: Rakaphyllium; Cumming & Le Tirant, 2022

Type species
- Rakaphyllium schultzei (Giglio-Tos, 1912)

Species
- Rakaphyllium exsectum; Rakaphyllium schultzei

= Rakaphyllium =

Genus of stick insects

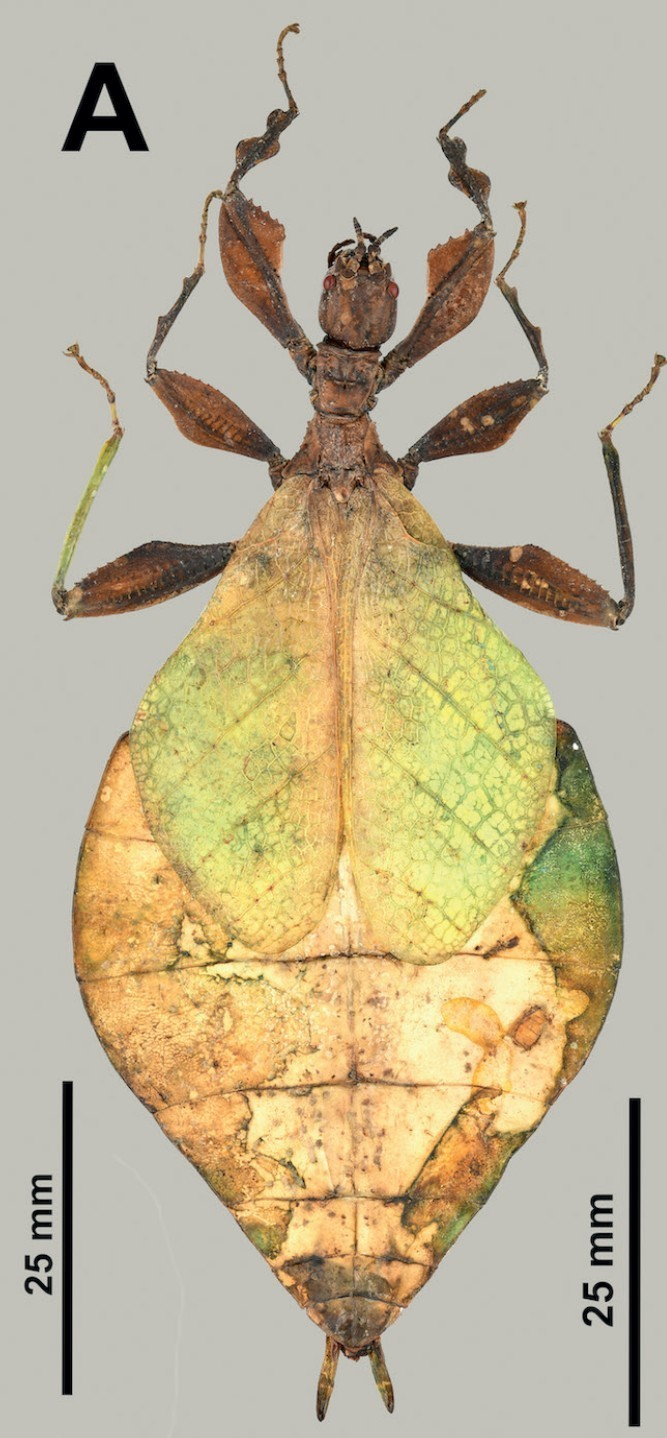
Rakaphyllium schultzei, adult female

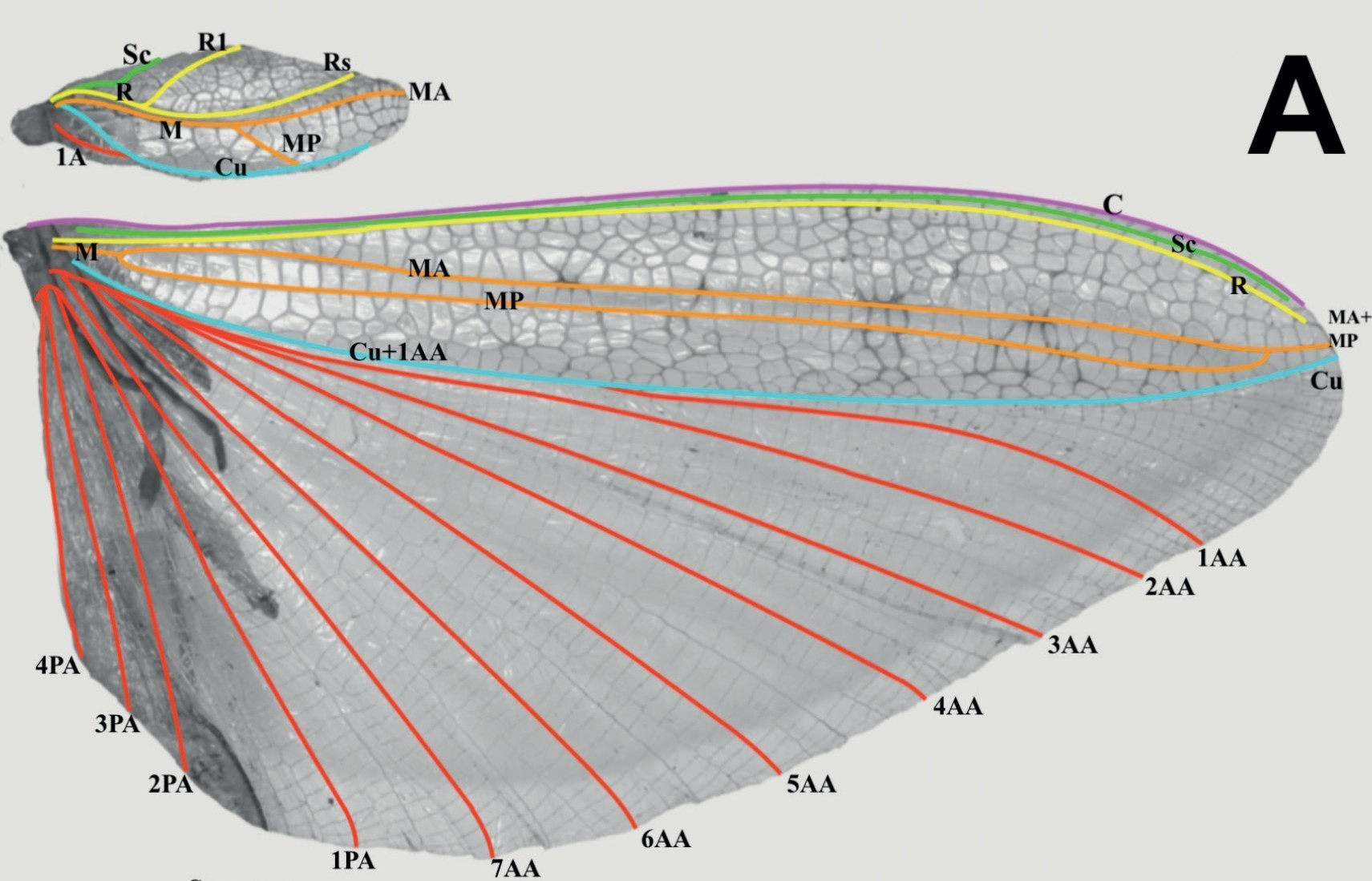
Venation of the wings of a male of Rakaphyllium schultzei

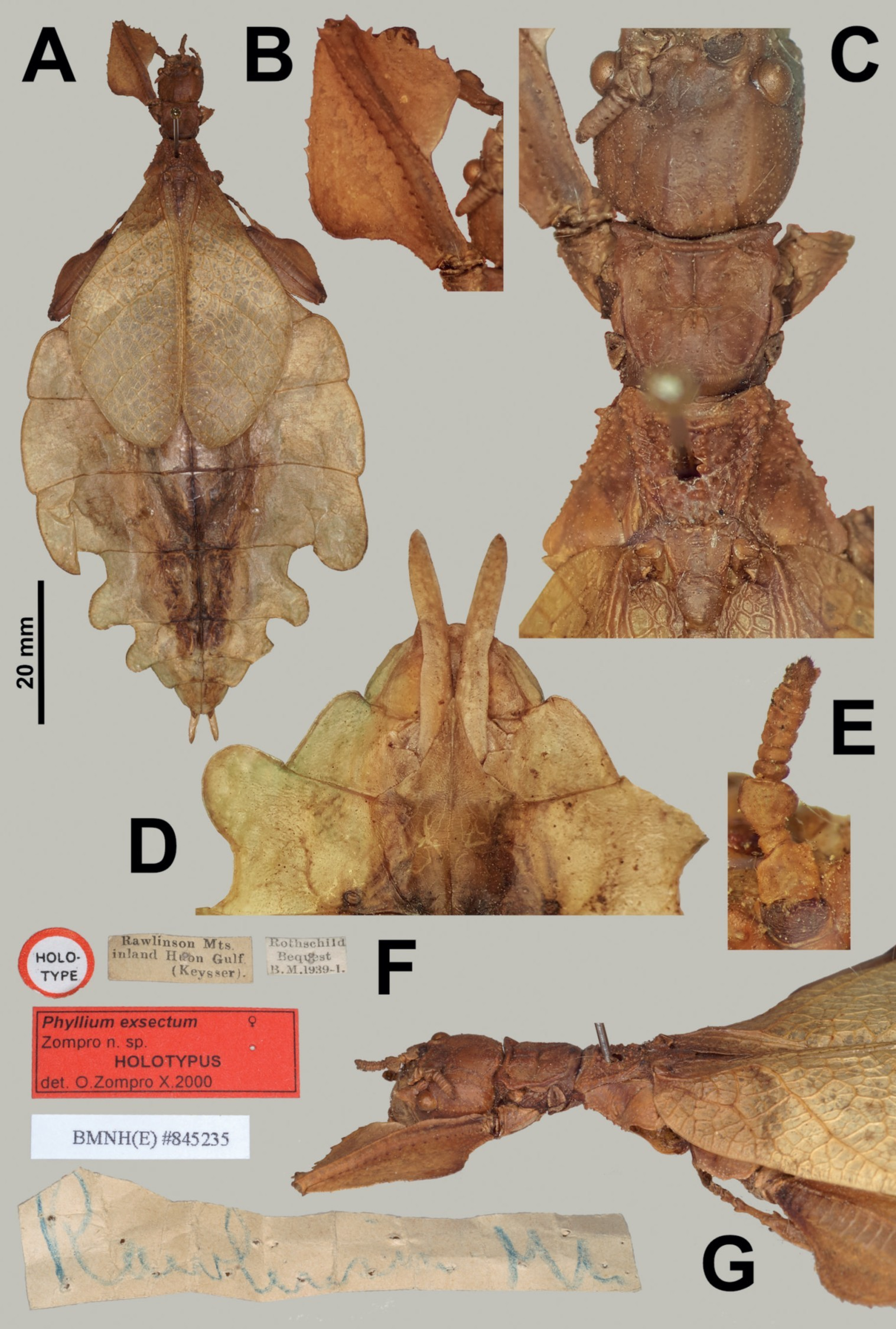
Rakaphyllium exsectum, female holotype with various details

Rakaphyllium is a genus of stick insect described in 2022, belonging to the Phylliidae, and native to New Guinea and the Aru Islands. The two species in this genus were previously classified in the genus Phyllium until 2021 and in its former subgenus Pulchriphyllium from 2021 to 2022.

== Description ==
Females of Rakaphyllium reach a body length of 80 to 92 millimetres (3.1 to 3.6 in) and a maximum abdominal width of 41 to 48 millimetres (1.6 to 1.9 in). Males of Rakaphyllium schultzei have a body length of about 59 millimetres (2.3 in) and a maximum abdominal width of 18.2 millimetres (0.72 in). Males of Rakaphyllium exsectum are unknown. Both sexes have lobes at the inner side of the tibae of the forelegs (interior protibial lobes) which do not span the full length of the shaft but are present only in the proximal half. On the outer sides of the forelegs' tibiae, there are two lobes, one at the proximal and one at the distal end. The outer tibial lobes of the mid and hind legs are markedly reduced or absent. If present, they are merely small spurs. The tegmina of females are of average length, reaching only to the fifth or sixth abdominal segment, while the tegmina of males are of medium length, reaching only to the second or third abdominal segment. Females possess rudimentary hindwings (alae). The hindwings of males are fully developed, oval-fan-shaped, and reach to the eighth to tenth abdominal segment. The abdomen reaches its maximum width approximately in the middle, with segments five or six being the widest. In both sexes, the anterior halves widen uniformly towards the middle segments. The shape of the posterior half of the abdomen varies considerably between species and sex. In Rakaphyllium schultzei, the posterior segments have a smooth edge, giving the abdomen an ovoid or pointed appearance, whereas in the female of Rakaphyllium exsectum, these segments are gently to strongly undulating, giving the abdomen a lobed appearance.

The autapomorphic characteristics of this genus are the exceptionally long gonapophyses of the eighth abdominal segment in females. They extend beyond the last abdominal segment by more than half of their length. In females of all other Phyllioidea, they only reach the tip of the abdomen or at most extend slightly beyond it. In males, the hindwing venation is unique within the Phyllioidea, as the radius vein of the hindwing is simple and not bifurcate as is seen in all other Phyllioidea genera.

== Occurrence ==
The distribution of the genus Rakaphyllium is limited to New Guinea and the Aru Islands. Rakaphyllium schultzei has been recorded in both Papua New Guinea and Western New Guinea. A male assigned to this species originates from Wokam Island, part of the Aru Islands. The only known specimen of Rakaphyllium exsectum, the female holotype, comes from the difficult-to-access Rawlinson Range on the Huon Gulf in the Morobe Province of Papua New Guinea.

== Taxonomy ==
As early as 2009, Frank H. Hennemann et al. proposed the division of Phyllium and its then-existing subgenera into species groups. They placed Phyllium (Pulchriphyllium) schultzei and Phyllium (Pulchriphyllium) exsectum together in the schultzei species group due to their shorter tegmina and the two lobes on the outer tibiae of the forelegs. In 2022 Royce T. Cumming and Stéphane Le Tirant separated the genus Rakaphyllium from the genus Pulchriphyllium, originally described by Achille Griffini in 1898. From 1906 to 2021, Pulchriphyllium was considered a subgenus of Phyllium. The name "Rakaphyllium" means "wandering leaf" and is composed of the Latinized name Phyllium, the type genus of the family (from the Greek φυλλον, -ου (phyllon, -oy)), and the prefix "raka" from the Hiri Motu language of New Guinea, meaning "to go" or "to wander". The name is intended to honor the indigenous peoples of this area who speak the Hiri Motu language and to indicate that these insects resemble leaves that simply stand up and walk away when disturbed. Like Phyllium, Rakaphyllium is also neuter.

The type species of the genus is Rakaphyllium schultzei, described in 1912 by Ermanno Giglio-Tos as Pulchriphyllium schultzei and listed as Phyllium (Pulchriphyllium) schultzei from 1906 to 2021. Rakaphyllium exsectum, described in 2001 by Oliver Zompro as Phyllium (Pulchriphyllium) exsectum, is also included in the genus.

The genus Rakaphyllium currently comprises the following two species:

- Rakaphyllium exsectum (Zompro, 2001)
- Rakaphyllium schultzei (Giglio-Tos, 1912)

Cumming and Le Tirant justify the separation of the genus Rakaphyllium from Pulchriphyllium, among other things, with the relationships within the Phyllioidea, which they present in their work. The justification is based on morphological and molecular genetic differences. The latter refers to investigations in previous studies, in which, however, no Rakaphyllium species were examined. Females of both Rakaphyllium species and males of Rakaphyllium schultzei were included in the morphological analysis. The phylogenetic classification of the genus Rakaphyllium was carried out using Bayesian inference, which in this case means based on morphological characteristics. Accordingly, Rakaphyllium is more closely related to the genera Chitoniscus, Vaabonbonphyllium, and Pulchriphyllium than to any other genera (see also Cladogram of the Phylliidae).
