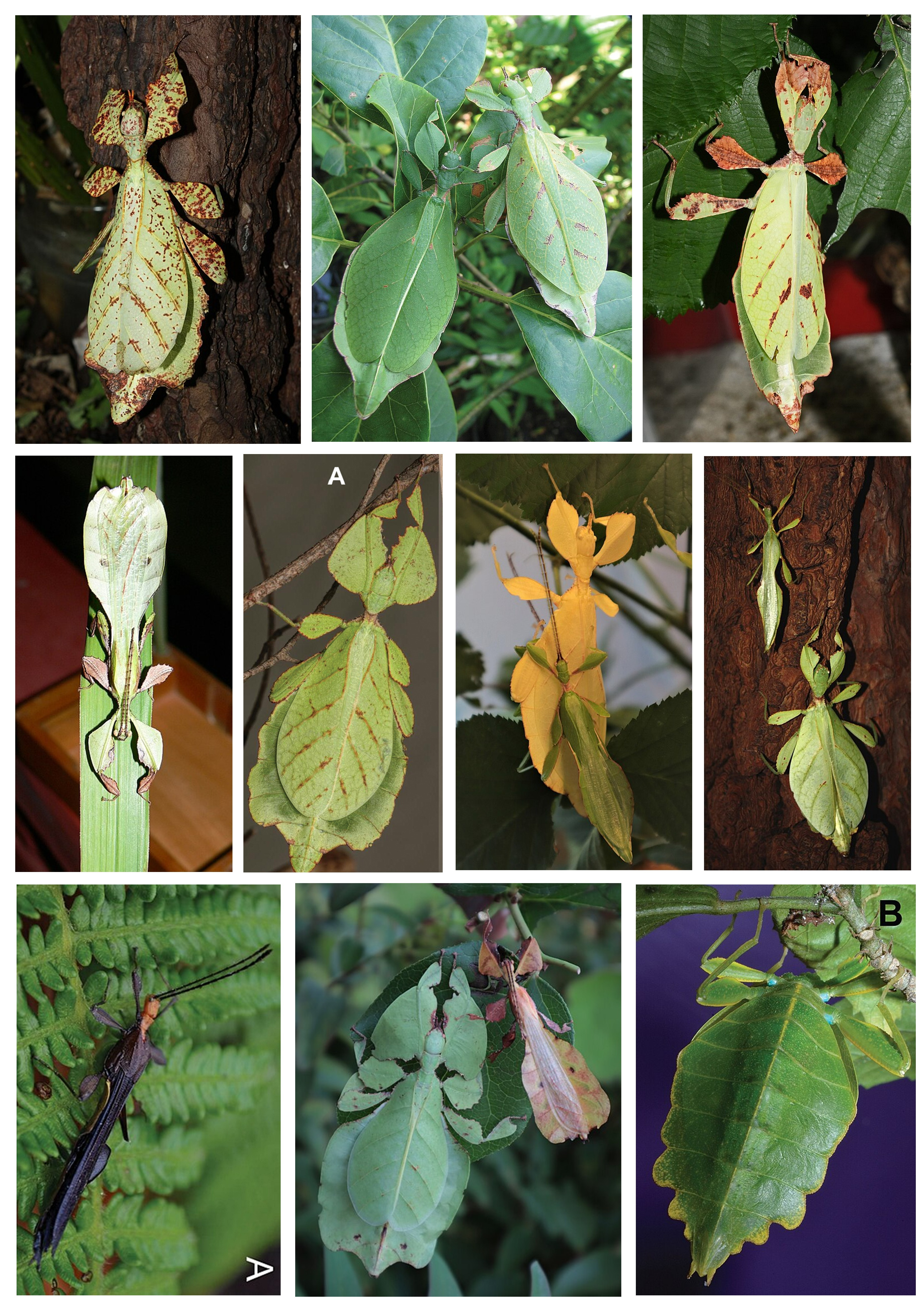
- Different species of Phylliidae

Scientific classification
- Kingdom: Animalia
- Phylum: Arthropoda
- Clade: Pancrustacea
- Class: Insecta
- Order: Phasmatodea
- Suborder: Euphasmatodea
- Superfamily: Phyllioidea; Brunner von Wattenwyl, 1893
- Family: Phylliidae; Brunner von Wattenwyl, 1893

Tribes
- Nanophylliini; Phylliini

= Phylliidae =

Leaf insects Temporal range: Eocene - Recent

Family of leaf insects

The family Phylliidae (often misspelled Phyllidae) is a family of stick insects and contains the extant true leaf insects or walking leaves, which include some of the most remarkably camouflaged leaf mimics (mimesis) in the entire animal kingdom. Because the family Phylliidae is the only one within the subfamily Phylliinae - which in turn is the only subfamily within the superfamily Phyllioidea - leaf insects are often equated with these taxa. They occur from South Asia through Southeast Asia to Australia.

== Characteristics ==
Leaf insects can reach body lengths ranging from 24 millimetres (0.94 in) (male of Microphyllium spinithorax) to 105 to 120 millimetres (4.1 to 4.7 in) (females of Pulchriphyllium giganteum and certain Cryptophyllium species). They are characterized by a body that is horizontally flattened and broadened to resemble a leaf (mimesis). Their legs are also optimally adapted to this leaf mimicry through leaf-like expansions (lobes). Depending on the species and origin, leaf insects appear in various shades of green, yellow, brown, or reddish; some are speckled, while others are nearly uniform in color. Certain species exhibit significant color variation. In some cases, species such as Pulchriphyllium crurifolium were described multiple times, resulting in a number of synonyms. Previously, it was assumed that individual species possessed highly variable body shapes and occupied vast geographical ranges. Recent studies indicate, however, that species formerly synonymized on this basis are almost all distinct, valid species with significantly smaller distribution ranges.

Females are consistently larger and significantly broader than males, bearing a stronger resemblance to leaves. This is due to their very broad abdomen and short mesonotum. Furthermore, the forewings (tegmina) of adult females are typically developed as leaf-like covers that often conceal the entire abdomen. Hindwings (alae) are either absent or merely vestigial in most females; they are well-developed only in the majority of females of the genus Cryptophyllium, as well as in Phyllium ericoriai and Phyllium bonifacioi. The smaller, narrower males usually possess short forewings and fully developed — mostly typically transparent — hindwings that enable short flights. They also generally feature three simple eyes (ocelli) on the vertex between the compound eyes. Their antennae are distinctly longer than those of the females and bear bristles; they consist of 20 to 26 segments, whereas the females' antennae are always composed of nine segments and extend only as far as the length of the head. These antennae are often modified into stridulatory organs. The abdomen is formed from ten segments; the posterior nine are free, while the first is fused with the metanotum. A transverse groove on the underside marks the transition between the metanotum and the first abdominal segment. The subgenital plate is located at the end of the eighth abdominal segment, concealing the genital opening and the ovipore. Located on the tenth abdominal sternum of the males is the vomer, a movable sclerite that serves to anchor the male to the female's seventh abdominal sternum during mating. It is usually shaped in a species-specific manner and bears a hook in almost all species; only the males of Cryptophyllium species have vomers with two hooks.

== Occurrence ==
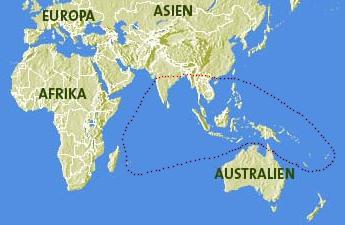
Distribution map of leaf insects according to Detlef Größer

The distribution range of extant leaf insects extends from the Seychelles across Sri Lanka, India, and the Asian mainland - including Nepal, Bangladesh, and southern Chinese provinces - through Southeast Asia and northern Queensland (Australia) to eastern Melanesia. The genus Pulchriphyllium has the westernmost distribution, ranging from the Seychelles across Sri Lanka, India, the Southeast Asian Peninsula, and Sumatra to Borneo. The distribution of the genus Cryptophyllium lies somewhat further to the northeast; it begins in the west in Sri Lanka and extends further north, spanning Nepal, the Indian states of West Bengal and Assam, and the Chinese regions of Tibet, Yunnan, Guangxi, and Hainan. In the southeast, it encompasses Sulawesi and the Philippines, extending as far as the Micronesian island of Yap. Species of the genus Phyllium occur even further east and south; in addition to the entirety of the Philippines and Indonesia, they inhabit the Malaysian part of Borneo, the Malay Peninsula, and the island of New Britain. Microphyllium and Pseudomicrophyllium are found in the Philippines. The distribution of the genus Nanophyllium lies east of the Weber Line and includes New Guinea and surrounding islands, as well as northeastern Australia, where Walaphyllium also occurs. The genera Acentetaphyllium, Rakaphyllium, Comptaphyllium, and Vaabonbonphyllium are also found on New Guinea, with the latter also occurring in the Solomon Islands. The distribution of Trolicaphyllium species - native to New Caledonia - lies even further to the southeast. The genus Chitoniscus has the easternmost distribution, extending to the Fiji Islands.

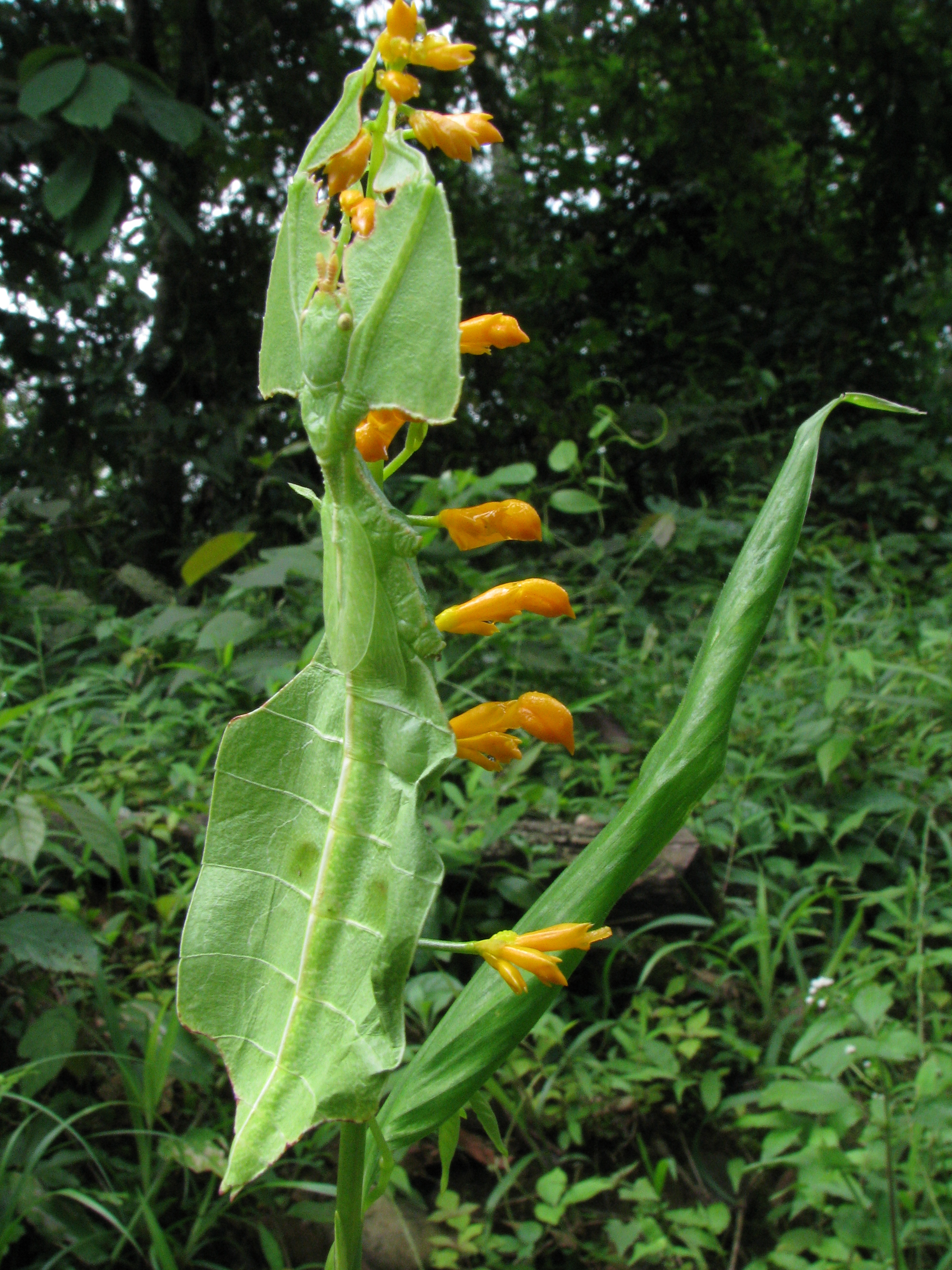
Subadult female of a Pulchriphyllium species in Pakke Tiger Reserve

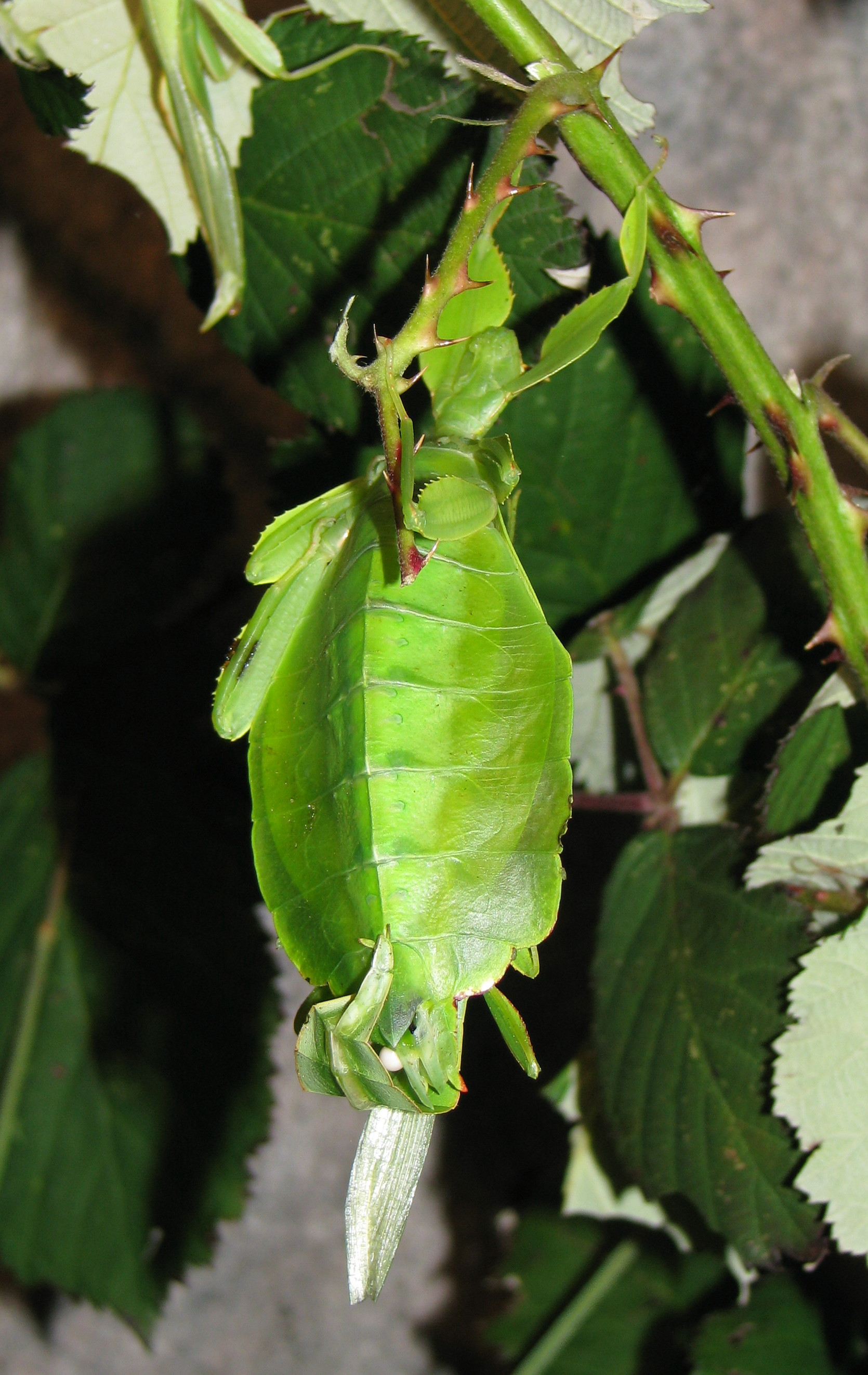
Mating of Phyllium philippinicum; the spermatophore is visible as a white pearl

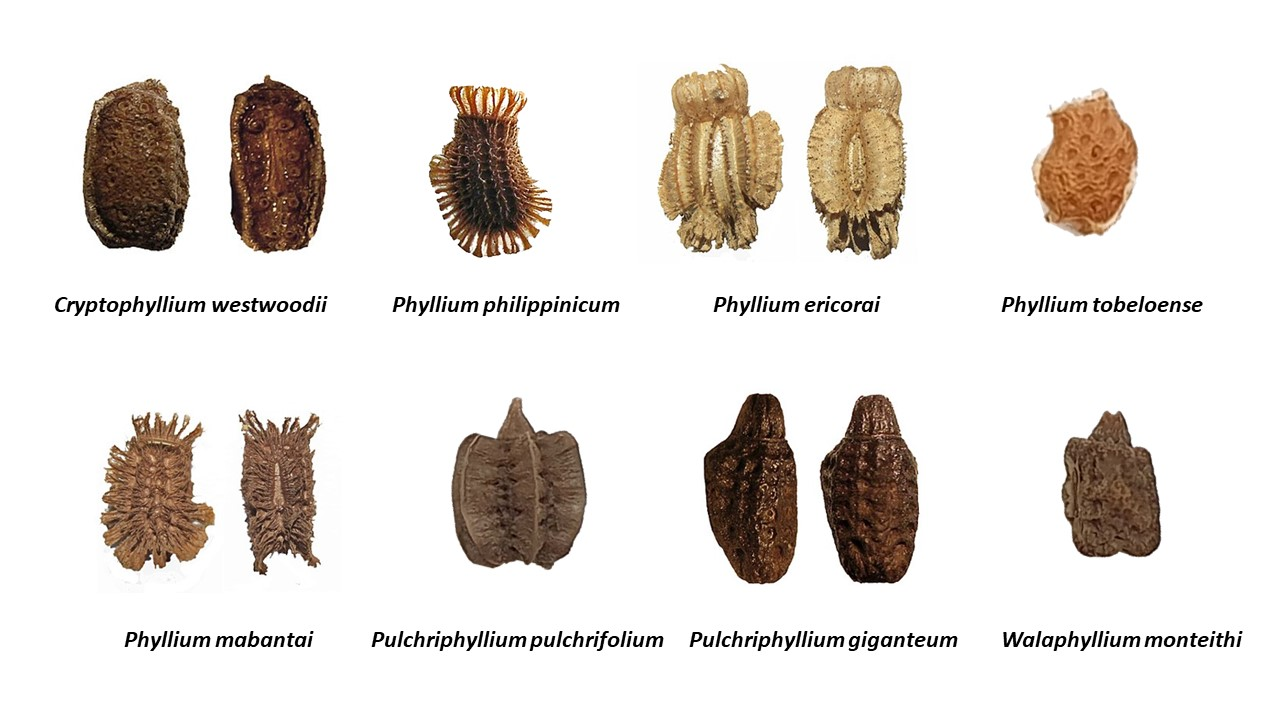
Eggs of 8 species of leaf insects

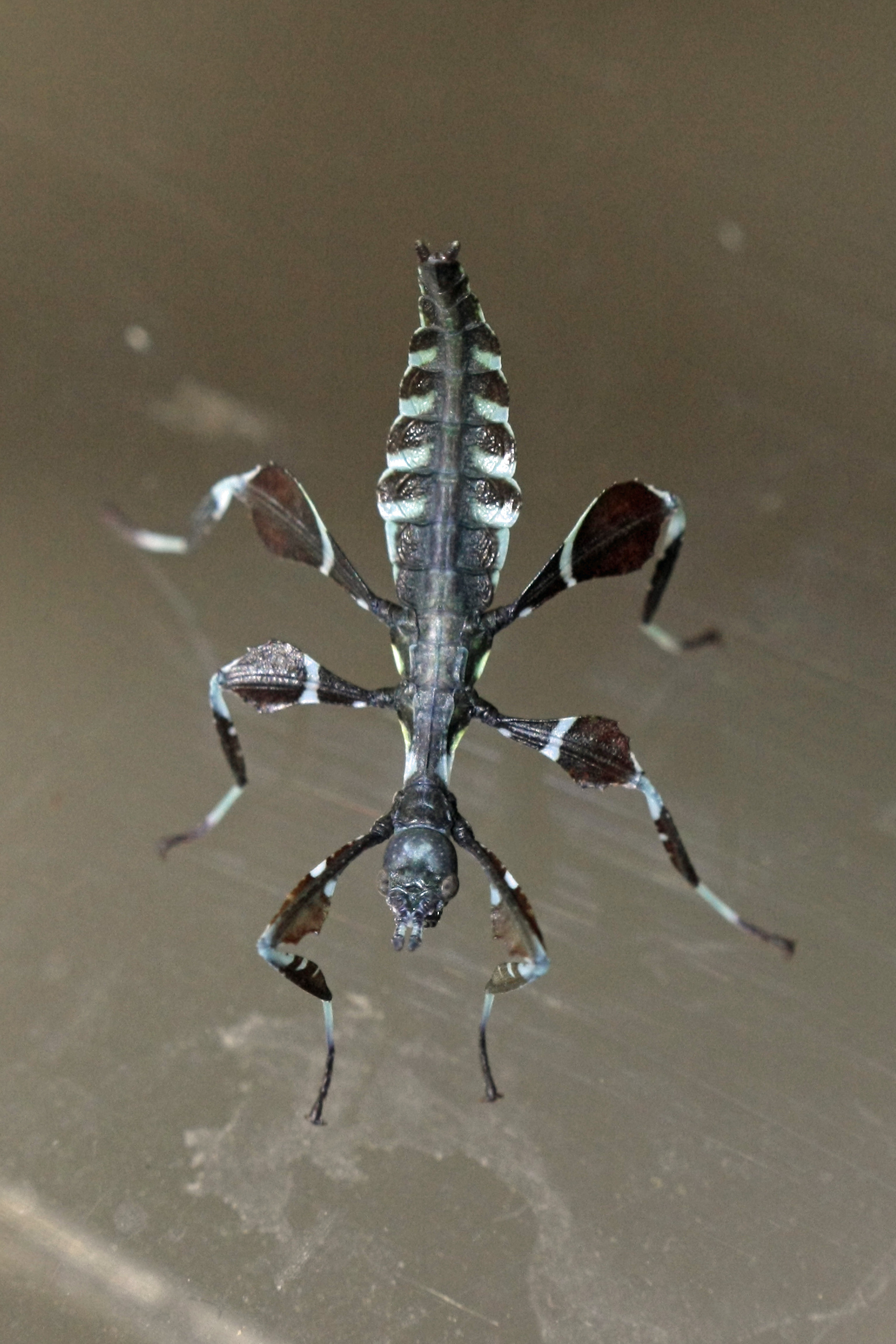
Freshly hatched nymph of Phyllium mabantai

== Way of life ==
=== Diet and food plants ===
Leaf insects are herbivorous insects that feed on the leaves of tropical plants - some of which are still unknown - as well as those of Psidium, Theobroma cacao, Myrtaceae, Mangifera indica, and Camellia sinensis.

=== Camouflage and defensive behavior ===
Leaf insects are well camouflaged, taking on the appearance of leaves. They do this so accurately that predators often are not able to distinguish them from real leaves. In some species, the edge of the leaf insect's body has the appearance of bite marks. To further confuse predators, when the leaf insect walks, it rocks back and forth, mimicking a real leaf being blown by the wind. In the female, this deceptive resemblance is enhanced by the large size and foliaceous form of the front wings, which, when at rest on the abdomen, forcibly suggest in their neuration the midrib and costae of an ordinary leaf.

The scholar Antonio Pigafetta was probably the first Western person to document the species, though it was known to people in the tropics for a long time. Sailing with Ferdinand Magellan's circumnavigational expedition, he studied and chronicled the fauna on the island of Cimbonbon as the fleet hauled ashore for repairs. During this time he documented the Phyllium species with the following passage:

In this island are also found certain trees, the leaves of which, when they fall, are animated, and walk. They are like the leaves of the mulberry tree, but not so long; they have the leaf stalk short and pointed, and near the leaf stalk they have on each side two feet. If they are touched they escape, but if crushed they do not give out blood. I kept one for nine days in a box. When I opened it the leaf went round the box. I believe they live upon air.

Adult females of most leaf insect species are capable of stridulation using their antennae. It is partly interpreted as defensive stridulation, as the insects stridulate when disturbed. However, its primary function is believed to be attracting males. Various species within the genera Phyllium and Cryptophyllium are known to possess highly effective defensive glands, from which they can spray a milky, caustic defensive secretion - varying in odor - through spiracle-like openings in the pronotum. Males and nymphs in particular, tend to shed their legs (autotomy) to distract predators.

=== Reproduction ===
Like most stick insects, leaf insects are capable of parthenogenetic reproduction. If males are present, females mate with them - depending on the species - roughly two to four weeks after molting into their adult form. Males detect the vibrations produced by stridulating females using their antennae and follow the signals to locate them. During mating, the male deposits a sperm packet (spermatophore) beneath the female's subgenital plate; the packet empties itself there before detaching. Females begin laying eggs three to four weeks after their final molt. The eggs - laid at a rate of one to three per week - are either dropped to the ground or flung away via a sudden, jerky movement of the abdomen. Depending on the species, each female lays between 100 and 300 eggs in this manner.

The eggs differ so significantly from one another that they are often used as the sole reliable diagnostic feature for distinguishing between species. In some cases, they resemble plant seeds; for instance, the eggs of Comptaphyllium caudatum look like rhubarb seeds, while those of Pulchriphyllium giganteum resemble the seeds of the four-o'clock flower (Mirabilis jalapa). In addition to eggs lacking appendages, there are frequently types featuring characteristically arranged, feathery-looking bristles (typical, for example, of Phyllium eggs). These bristles are typically long, densely packed, branched, and either interlocked or fused together. On freshly laid eggs, they lie flat against the egg's surface, unfurling only after deposition when exposed to appropriate humidity levels. The lid (operculum) of such eggs is often encircled by a ring of bristles. In other species, the lid may sit atop the egg like a cap. The egg surfaces - which range from finely to coarsely porous - usually feature structures such as pits or grooves that are also characteristic of the specific species. Egg shape is often defined by ridges and keels, resulting in cross-sections that may appear rectangular, square, pentagonal, or star-shaped. The micropylar plate is generally spindle-shaped; the micropyle is located towards the lower pole, where the plate widens slightly.

The freshly hatched nymphs, which are initially very strikingly colored, hatch after four to eight months by pushing open the lid with their heads. They feature red, reddish-brown, or blackish-brown markings, often made even more conspicuous by white spots. Before feeding for the first time, they move rapidly across their host plants, tending to climb upwards. After a few days, they adopt the lifestyle of their parents and increasingly turn green. Development into an adult insect takes four to eight months, depending on the species and sex; males molt four times and females six times. The old skin (exuviae) is usually consumed after molting, as it contains important trace elements. In many species, coloration depends on environmental conditions (particularly humidity and temperature, but also diet and light).

== Taxonomy ==
The subfamily Phylliinae comprises 120 valid species (as of July 2026), about half of which have been described since 2016. In addition to the fossil genus Eophyllium, thirteen extant genera are recognized, eight of which have been described since 2017.

=== History ===
Among the first three species of stick and leaf insects scientifically described by Carl Linnaeus in the 10th edition of "Systema Naturae" (1758) was a leaf insect: Gryllus (Mantis) siccifolius. In 1798, Johann Karl Wilhelm Illiger established the genus Phyllium specifically for this species, while Gryllus later became the type genus of crickets and Mantis became the type genus of mantis. Additional species of Phyllium, as well as the first species of the genus Chitoniscus (established by Carl Stål in 1875), were described during the 19th century. In 1893, Carl Brunner von Wattenwyl assigned both genera to the family Phylliidae, a family he was the first to mention. He is thus considered the original author of the family, as well as of all derived taxa, such as the tribe, subfamily, and superfamily.

Following the genus Phyllium (described in 1798) and Chitoniscus (described in 1875), Achille Griffini established the subgenus Pulchriphyllium within the genus Phyllium in 1998. In 2003, Oliver Zompro and Detlef Größer established the tribe Nanophylliini for the genus Nanophyllium, which had been described by Josef Redtenbacher in 1906. However, the division of the subfamily Phylliinae into the two tribes Phylliini and Nanophylliini is not supported by recent molecular genetic studies. Two additional subgenera within Phyllium - Comptaphyllium and Walaphyllium - were described in 2019 and 2020, respectively. Since 2021, all three subgenera have been regarded as distinct genera.

In 2009, Frank H. Hennemann et al. proposed classifying the genus Phyllium and its then-existing subgenera Phyllium and Pulchriphyllium into species groups. This classification approach was subsequently adopted by other authors and applied to additional genera; for instance, the genus Trolicaphyllium was split off from the genus Chitoniscus. The practice of grouping species was also reflected in the description of new genera and the reassignment of certain species to different genera. The species originally assigned to these groups are listed here alongside their current generic classifications:

- Celebicum species-group

➔ Cryptophyllium: Cryptophyllium athanysus, Cryptophyllium celebicum, Cryptophyllium parum, Cryptophyllium rarum, Cryptophyllium tibetense, Cryptophyllium westwoodii, Cryptophyllium yunnanense
➔ further in Phyllium: Phyllium ericoriai

- Bioculatum species-group

➔ Pulchriphyllium: Pulchriphyllium bioculatum (including the species listed as synonyms in 2009: Pulchriphyllium agathyrsus, Pulchriphyllium crurifolium, Pulchriphyllium pulchrifolium, Pulchriphyllium scythe), Pulchriphyllium giganteum, Pulchriphyllium sinense

- Schultzei species-group

➔ Rakaphyllium: Rakaphyllium schultzei, Rakaphyllium exsectum

- Frondosum species-group

➔ Nanophyllium: Nanophyllium asekiense, Nanophyllium chitoniscoides, Nanophyllium frondosum, Nanophyllium keyicum, Nanophyllium suzukii
➔ Vaabonbonphyllium: Vaabonbonphyllium groesseri

- Brevipenne species-group

➔ Acentetaphyllium: Acentetaphyllium brevipenne

- Siccifolium species-group

➔ Walaphyllium: Walaphyllium monteithi, Walaphyllium zomproi
➔ Comptaphyllium: Comptaphyllium caudatum
➔ Cryptophyllium: Cryptophyllium drunganum
➔ Pseudomicrophyllium: Pseudomicrophyllium geryon
➔ Phyllium: Phyllium bilobatum, Phyllium elegans, Phyllium gantungense, Phyllium hausleithneri, Phyllium jacobsoni, Phyllium mabantai, Phyllium mamasaense, Phyllium mindorense, Phyllium palawanense, Phyllium philippinicum, Phyllium siccifolium, Phyllium tobeloense, Phyllium woodi
➔ Nomen nudum: Phyllium rayongii

=== Inner taxonomy ===
In recent times, molecular genetic analyses have increasingly been incorporated alongside morphological studies to elucidate the phylogeny of leaf insects. When comparing female and male specimens, the combination of these traits using Bayesian inference do not yet provide a clear phylogenetic picture of the recent genera.

Cladograms of the Phylliidae species determined on the basis of molecular genetics analysis and morphological investigations according to Cumming and Le Tirant (2022):

Cladogram of Phylliidae ♀

- Phylliidae
  - - Rakaphyllium
    - - - Vaabonbonphyllium
        - Chitoniscus
      - Pulchriphyllium
  - - - - Comptaphyllium
        - - - Acentetaphyllium
            - Nanophyllium
          - Trolicaphyllium
      - Walaphyllium
    - - - Cryptophyllium
        - Phyllium
      - - Microphyllium
        - Pseudomicrophyllium

Relationships of the Phylliidae genera after examining females from 27 species

Cladogram of Phylliidae ♂

- Phylliidae
  - - - - Rakaphyllium
        - Vaabonbonphyllium
      - Chitoniscus
    - Pulchriphyllium
  - - - - - Comptaphyllium
          - - Acentetaphyllium
            - Nanophyllium
        - Trolicaphyllium
      - Walaphyllium
    - - Cryptophyllium
      - - Phyllium
        - - Microphyllium
          - Pseudomicrophyllium

Relationships of the Phylliidae genera after examining males from 28 species

These relationships could not be confirmed by purely molecular genetic results. The results obtained from gene analyses by Sarah Bank are presented in the cladogram of the Phylliidae genera according to Cumming et al. (2023):

Cladogram of the Phylliidae genera shown according to Cumming et al (2023):

Cladogram of the Phylliidae genera examined using molecular genetics

Relationships of the Phylliidae genera excluding the genera Rakaphyllium, Acentetaphyllium and Vaabonbonphyllium which have not yet been studied using molecular genetics

- Phylliidae
  - Chitoniscus
  - - - Walaphyllium
      - - - Comptaphyllium
          - Trolicaphyllium
        - Nanophyllium
    - - - Cryptophyllium
        - - - Microphyllium & Pseudomicrophyllium
            - Pulchriphyllium
          - Phyllium

The Phasmida Species File lists the following genera in two tribes:

==== Phylliini ====
Auth. Brunner von Wattenwyl, 1893

- Chitoniscus Stål, 1875 (Pacific)
  - Chitoniscus feejeeanus (Westwood, 1864)
  - Chitoniscus lobipes Redtenbacher, 1906
  - Chitoniscus lobiventris (Blanchard, 1853) - type species (as Phyllium lobiventre Blanchard)
- Comptaphyllium Cumming, Le Tirant & Hennemann, 2019 (Australasia)
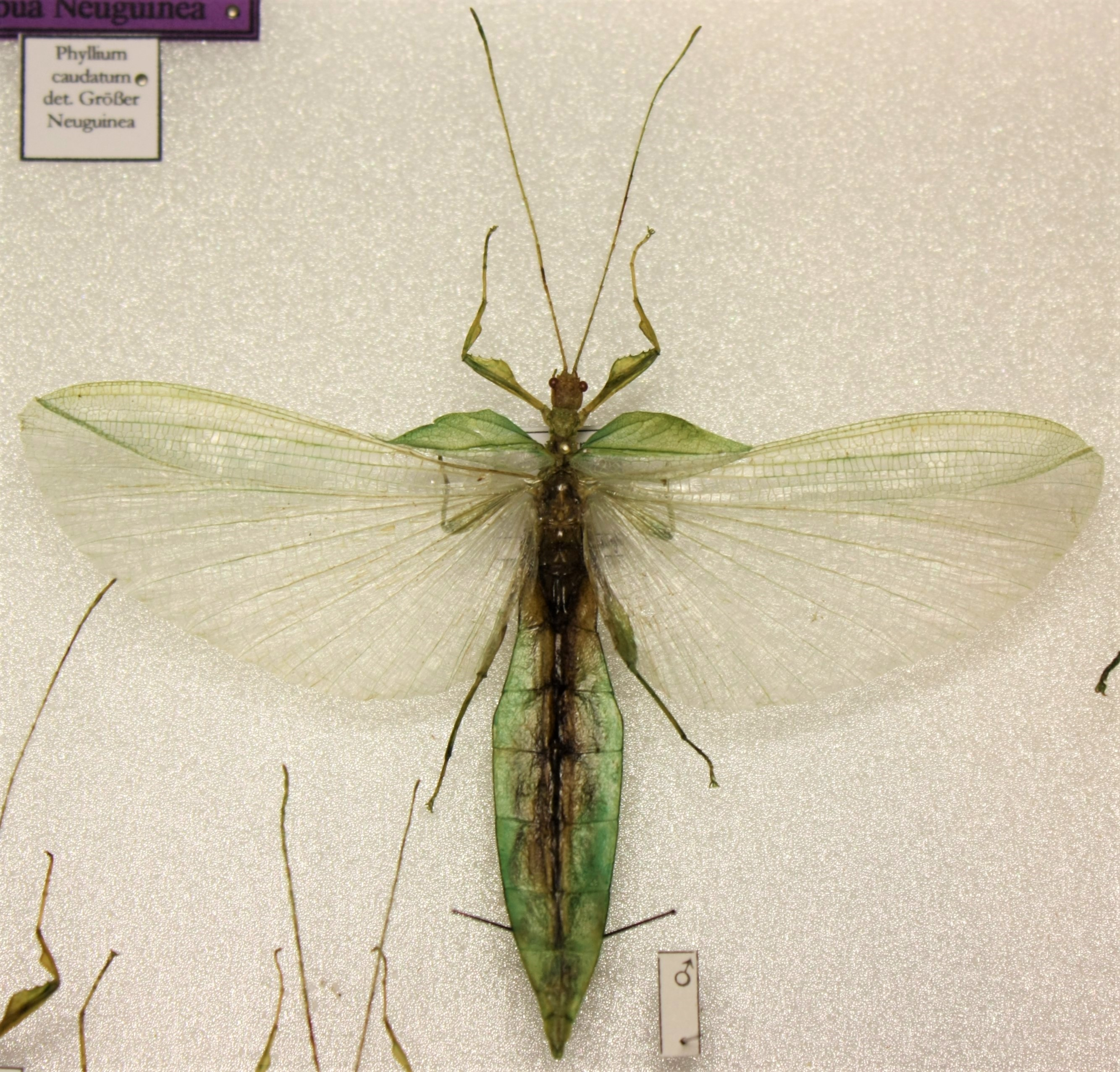
  Comptaphyllium caudatum, male from the collection of D. Größer
  - Comptaphyllium caudatum (Redtenbacher, 1906) - type species (as Phyllium caudatum Redtenbacher)
  - Comptaphyllium regina (Cumming, Le Tirant & Hennemann, 2019)
  - Comptaphyllium riedeli (van de Kamp & Hennemann, 2014)
- Cryptophyllium Cumming, Bank, Bresseel, Constant, Le Tirant, Dong, Soner & Bradler, 2021 (SE Asia).
  Selected species:
  - Cryptophyllium athanysus Westwood, 1859
  - Cryptophyllium celebicum (De Haan, 1842) - type species (as Phyllium celebicum Haan, W. de)
  - Cryptophyllium westwoodii (Wood-Mason, 1875)
- Microphyllium Zompro, 2001 (Northern Philippine Islands)
  - Microphyllium haskelli Cumming, 2017
  - Microphyllium spinithorax Zompro, 2001 - type species

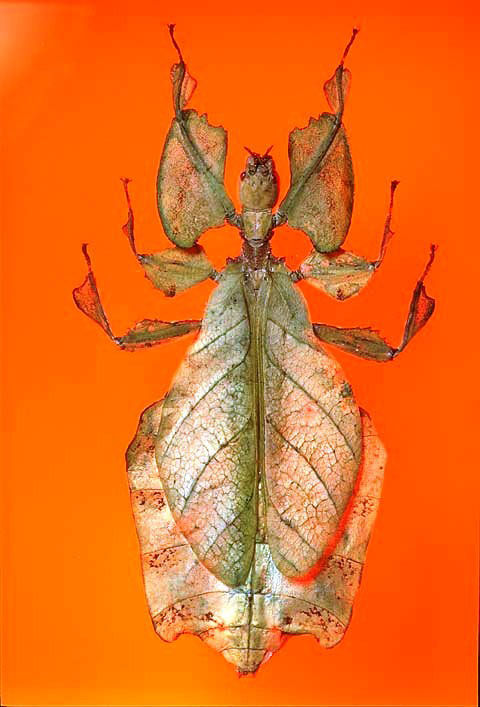
Pulchriphyllium giganteum in the permanent collection of The Children's Museum of Indianapolis

- Phyllium Illiger, 1798 (Sundaland, Philippine Islands, Wallacea, Australasia).
  Selected species:
  - Phyllium bilobatum Gray, G.R., 1843
  - Phyllium hausleithneri Brock, 1999
  - Phyllium jacobsoni Rehn, J.A.G. & Rehn, J.W.H., 1934
  - Phyllium letiranti Cumming & Teemsma, 2018
  - Phyllium siccifolium (Linnaeus, 1758) - type species (as Gryllus siccifolius Linnaeus)
- Pseudomicrophyllium Cumming, 2017 (Northern Philippine Islands)
  - Pseudomicrophyllium geryon (Gray, G.R., 1843)
  - Pseudomicrophyllium pusillulum (Rehn, J.A.G. & Rehn, J.W.H., 1934) - type species (as Pseudomicrophyllium faulkneri Cumming)
- Pulchriphyllium Griffini, 1898 (Seychelles, India, Western Indonesia, continental Asia)
  Selected species:
  - Pulchriphyllium bioculatum (Gray, G.R., 1832)
  - Pulchriphyllium giganteum (Hausleithner, 1984)
  - Pulchriphyllium pulchrifolium (Serville, 1838) - type species (as Phyllium pulchrifolium Serville)
- Rakaphyllium Cumming & Le Tirant, 2022 (New Guinea and Ayu Islands)
  - Rakaphyllium exsectum (Zompro, 2001)
  - Rakaphyllium schultzei (Giglio-Tos, 1912) – type species (as Pulchriphyllium schultzei Giglio-Tos)
- Trolicaphyllium Cumming, Le Tirant & Büscher, 2021 (Pacific)
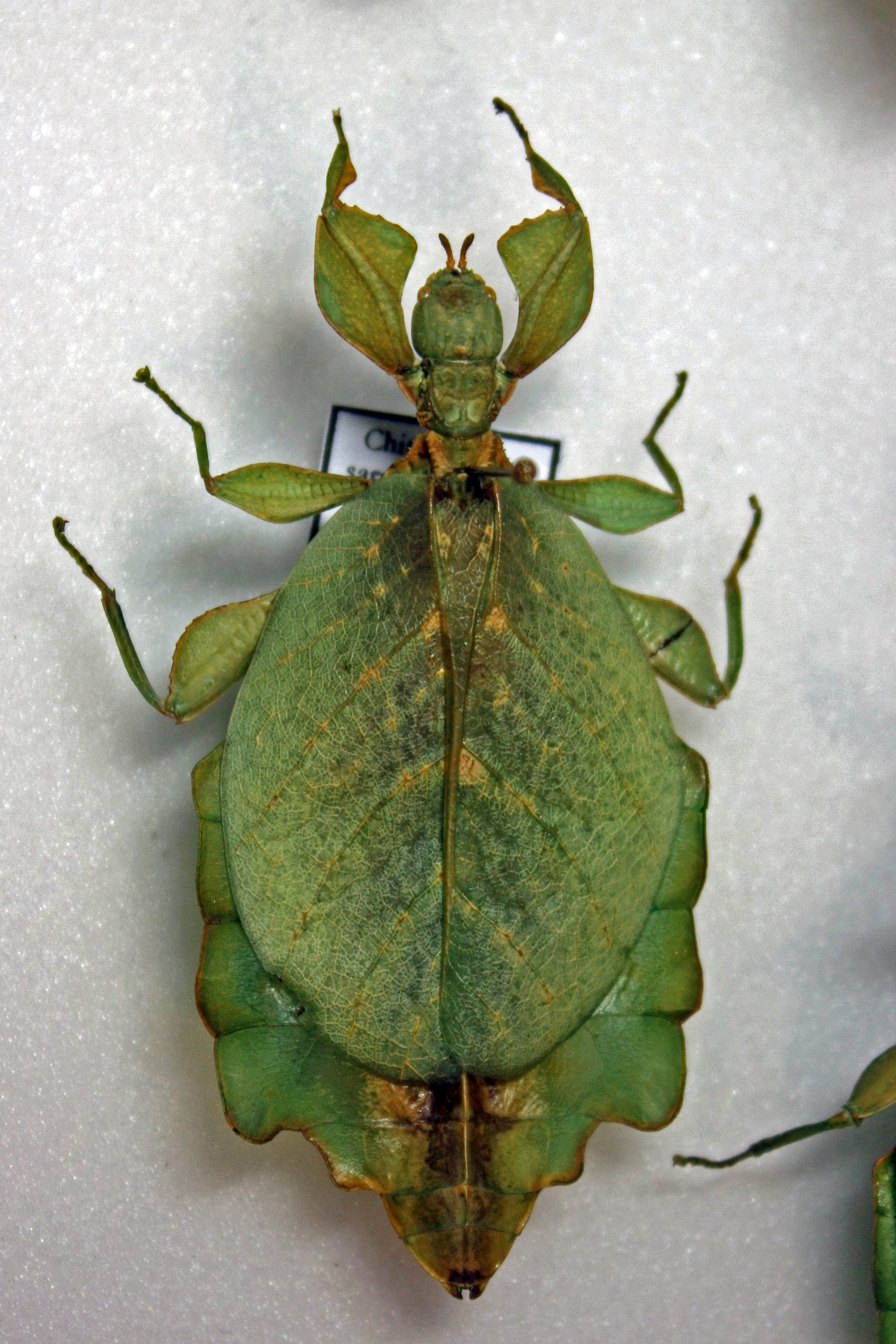
  Trolicaphyllium sarrameaense, female from the collection of D. Größer
  - Trolicaphyllium brachysoma (Sharp, 1898) - type species (as Phyllium brachysoma Sharp)
  - Trolicaphyllium erosus (Redtenbacher, 1906)
  - Trolicaphyllium sarrameaense Grösser, 2008
- Vaabonbonphyllium Cumming & Le Tirant, 2022 (New Guinea and Solomon Islands)
  - Vaabonbonphyllium groesseri (Zompro, 1998) – type species (as Phyllium groesseri Zompro)
  - Vaabonbonphyllium rafidahae Cumming & Le Tirant, 2022
- Walaphyllium Cumming, Thurman, Youngdale & Le Tirant, 2020 (Australasia)
  - Walaphyllium lelantos (Cumming, Thurman, Youngdale & Le Tirant, 2020)
  - Walaphyllium monteithi (Brock & Hasenpusch, 2002)
  - Walaphyllium zomproi (Grösser, 2001) - type species (as Phyllium zomproi Grösser)

==== Nanophylliini ====
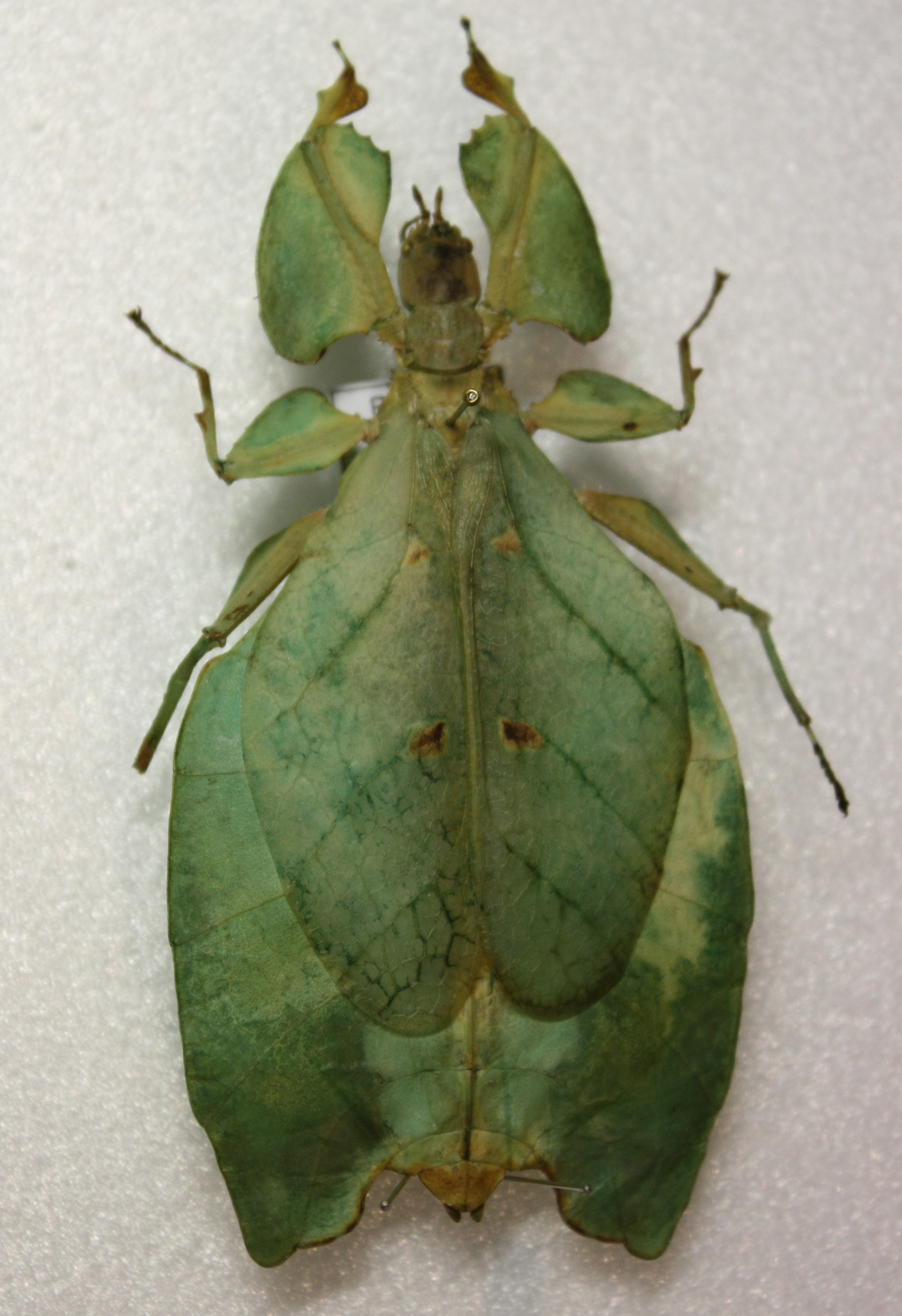
Nanophyllium asekiense, female from the collection of D. Größer

Auth. Zompro & Grösser, 2003

- Acentetaphyllium Cumming & Le Tirant, 2022 (New Guinea)
  - Acentetaphyllium brevipenne (Grösser, 1992) – type species (as Phyllium brevipennis Grösser)
  - Acentetaphyllium larssoni (Cumming, 2017)
  - Acentetaphyllium miyashitai (Cumming, Le Tirant, Teemsma, Hennemann, Willemse & Büscher, 2020)
  - Acentetaphyllium stellae (Cumming, 2016)
- Nanophyllium Redtenbacher, 1906 (Southern Indonesia, New Guinea, NE Australia)
  - Nanophyllium adisi Zompro & Grösser, 2003
  - Nanophyllium asekiense Grösser, 2002
  - Nanophyllium australianum Cumming, Le Tirant & Teemsma, 2018
  - Nanophyllium chitoniscoides (Grösser, 1992)
  - Nanophyllium daphne Cumming, Le Tirant, Teemsma, Hennemann, Willemse & Büscher, 2020
  - Nanophyllium frondosum (Redtenbacher, 1906)
  - Nanophyllium hasenpuschi Brock & Grösser, 2008
  - Nanophyllium keyicum (Karny, 1914)
  - Nanophyllium pygmaeum Redtenbacher, 1906 – type species
  - Nanophyllium rentzi Brock & Grösser, 2008
  - Nanophyllium suzukii (Grösser, 2008)

=== Outer taxonomy ===
The Phyllioidea are one of seven superfamilies within the suborder Euphasmatodea. Previously, they were one of the four superfamilies assigned to the former infraorder Areolatae. The Phyllioidea comprise only a single family- the Phylliidae- which in turn contains only one subfamily, the Phylliinae.

=== Extinct species ===
A 47-million-year-old fossil leaf insect was discovered in the Messel Pit in 2005. Described in 2007 by Sonja Wedmann et al. as Eophyllium messelensis, it demonstrates that the distribution range of leaf insects was once significantly larger and not confined to Southeast Asia as it is today. The fossil is exceptionally well-preserved and bears a strong resemblance to fossilized leaves previously found at the Messel Pit. Its abdomen is laterally expanded, giving it a leaf-like appearance. The fossil resembles the males of extant leaf insects; while it shares similarities in size and other external characteristics, it also exhibits minor differences, such as in the reproductive organs.

== Captivity ==
The first species began to be kept in the terrariums of European enthusiasts in the mid-1970s. While the Phasmid Study Group’s list originally included only eight species under ten entry numbers, many species, often originating from multiple collection sites, are now being bred. The popularity of specific species fluctuates depending on availability and husbandry requirements. The initial species kept belonged to the genera now known as Phyllium and Pulchriphyllium. Early Phyllium species in captivity included Phyllium siccifolium and Phyllium bilobatum or Phyllium cf. bilobatum the former was subsequently reclassified and described as Phyllium hausleithneri in 1999. Among the Pulchriphyllium species, Pulchriphyllium bioculatum and Pulchriphyllium pulchrifolium were initially common in captivity, though the two were sometimes confused, and the latter was at one point synonymized with the former. Subsequently, the parthenogenetically reproducing Pulchriphyllium giganteum entered captivity. The first species now assigned to the genus Cryptophyllium - Cryptophyllium westwoodii - also appeared early on, though initially under the name of the similar Cryptophyllium celebicum. Phyllium philippinicum became widely kept due to the ease of breeding it. From the turn of the millennium onwards, an increasing number of species entered captivity; today, approximately 14 Phyllium species, 6 Pulchriphyllium species, 12 Cryptophyllium species, and - representing its genus - Walaphyllium monteithi are kept and bred. With Comptaphyllium caudatum, a representative of the genus Comptaphyllium was also in culture, at least for a time. Breeding trials involving Nanophyllium asekiense are also expected to take place, following the successful hatching and rearing of this species from eggs at the Montreal Insectarium in 2018 and 2019. Nanophyllium australianum is also reportedly being bred in its native Australia.
