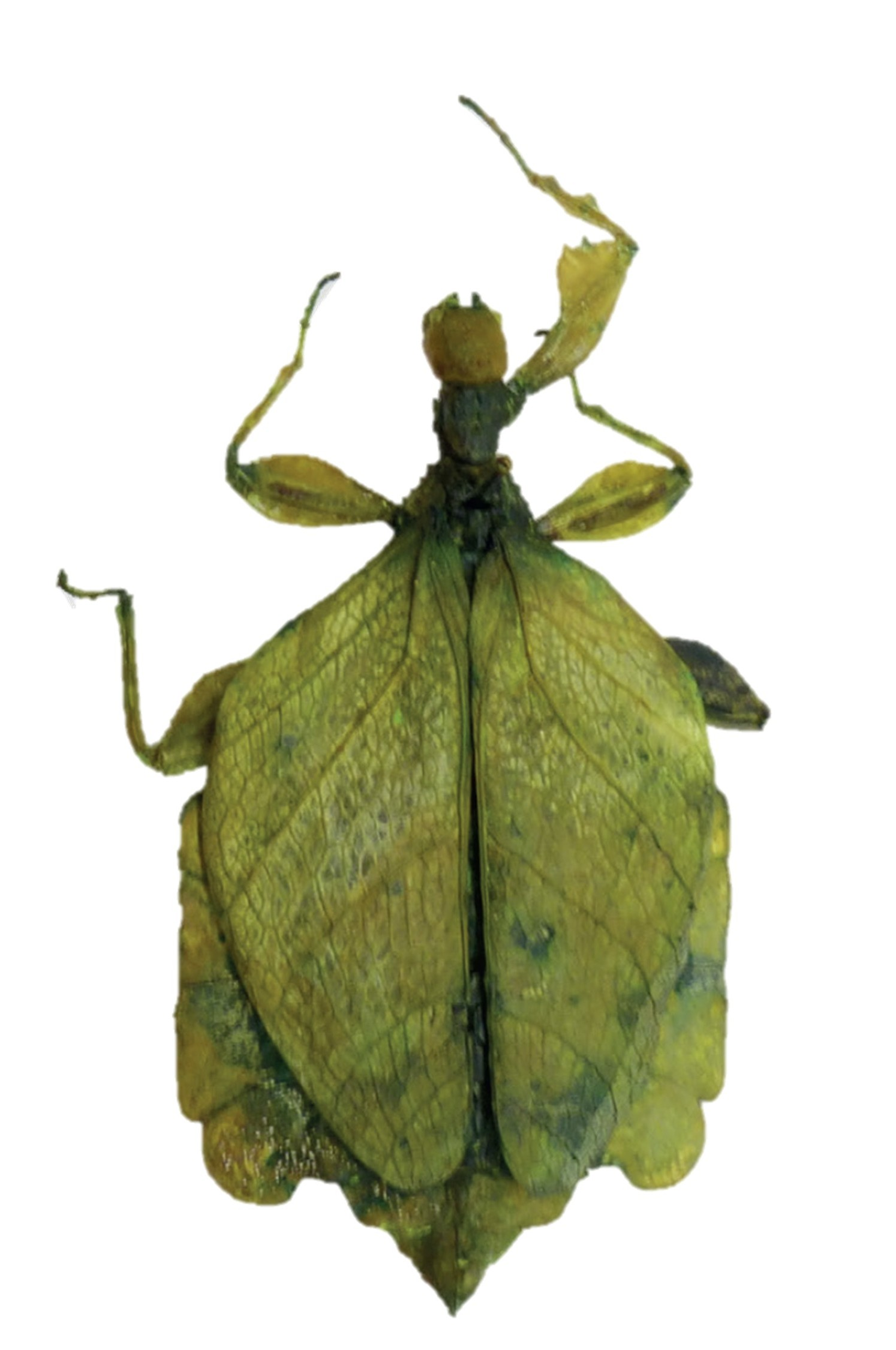
- Female holotype of Vaabonbonphyllium groesseri

Scientific classification
- Kingdom: Animalia
- Phylum: Arthropoda
- Clade: Pancrustacea
- Class: Insecta
- Order: Phasmatodea
- Superfamily: Phyllioidea
- Family: Phylliidae
- Tribe: Phylliini
- Genus: Vaabonbonphyllium; Cumming & Le Tirant, 2022

Type species
- Vaabonbonphyllium groesseri (Zompro, 1998)

Species
- Vaabonbonphyllium groesseri; Vaabonbonphyllium rafidahae

= Vaabonbonphyllium =

Genus of stick insects

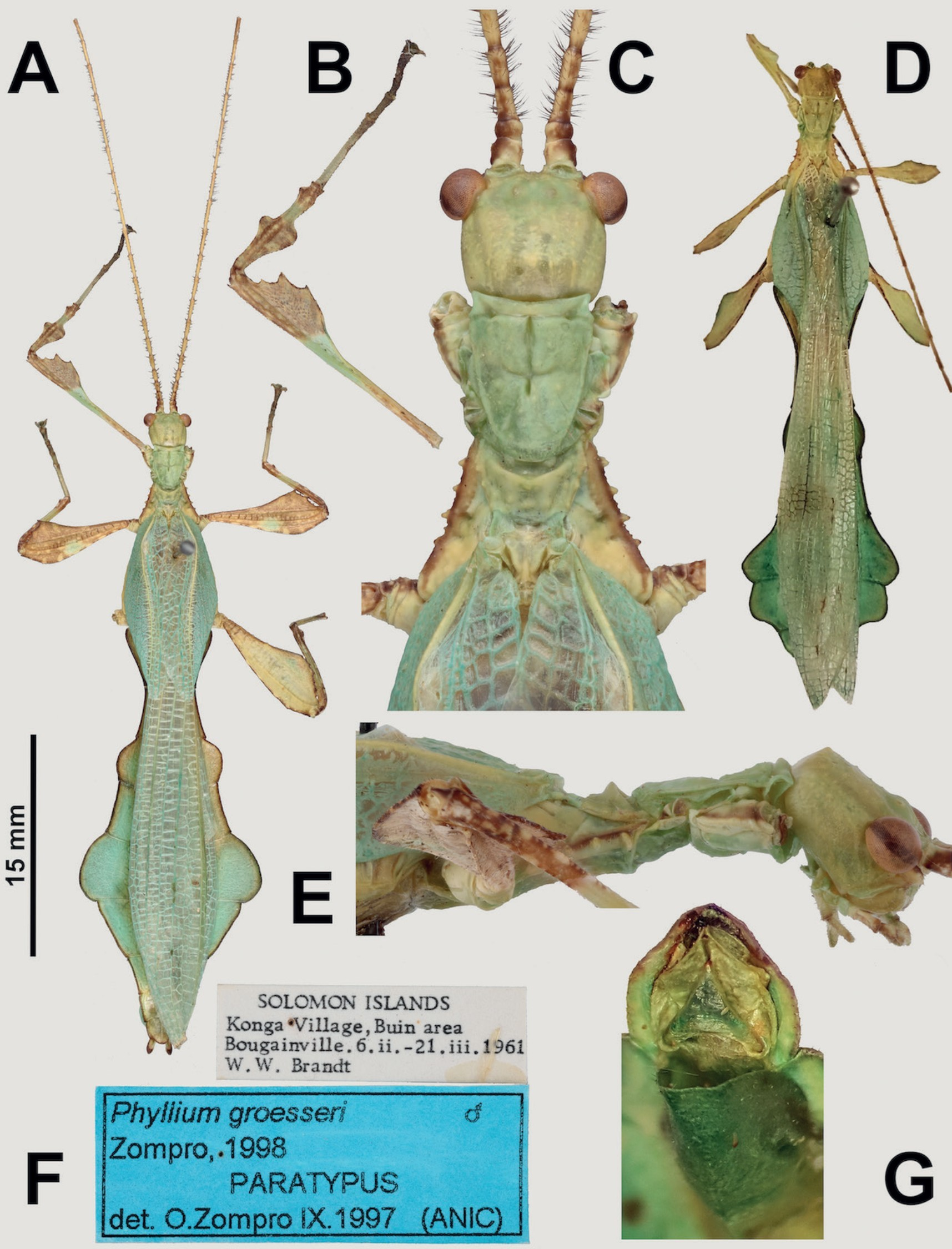
Male of Vaabonbonphyllium groesseri, images A–C, E, F of the male paratype

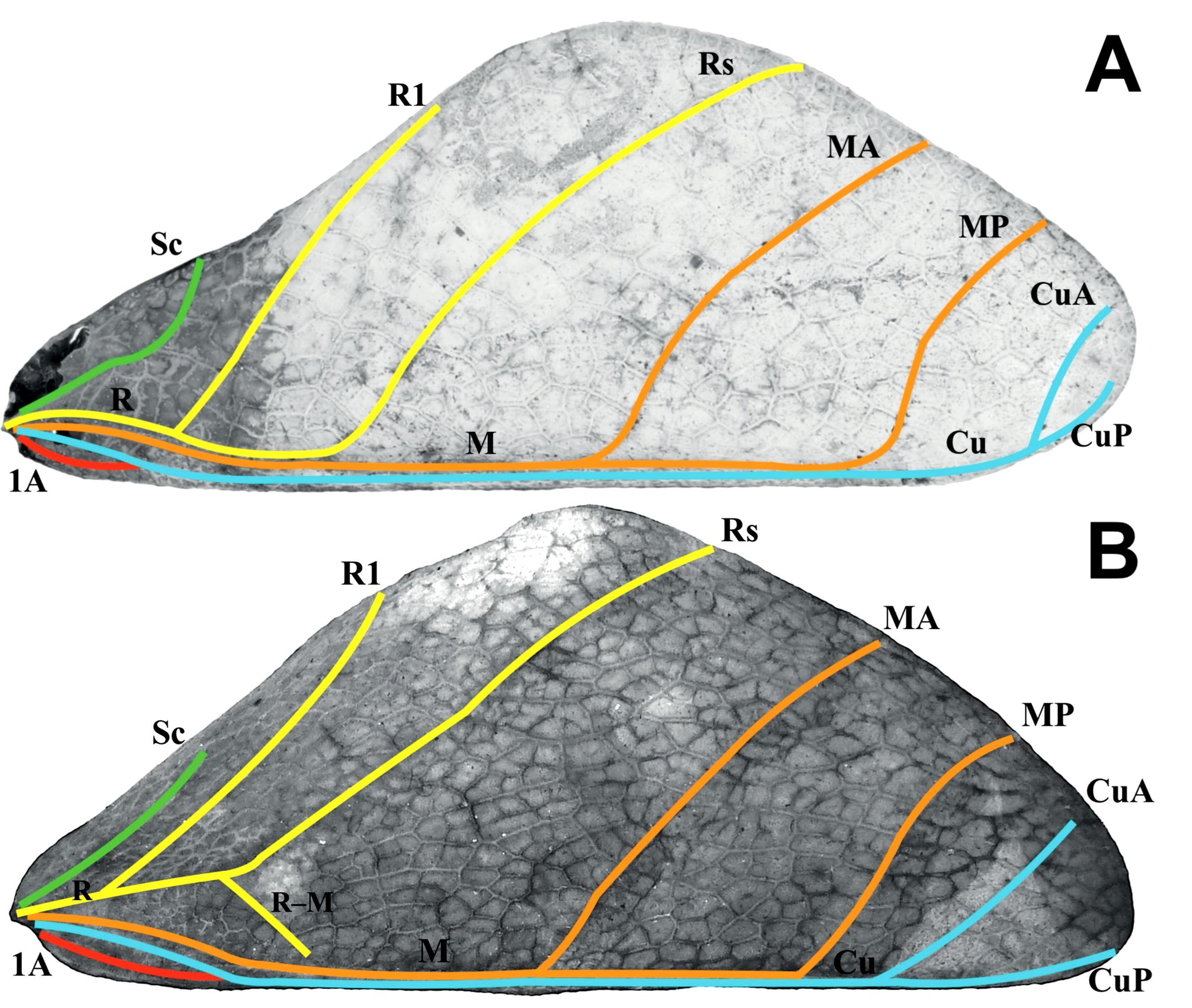
Comparison of the venation of the forewings (tegmina) of the females of A Rakaphyllium schultzei and B Vaabonbonphyllium groesseri

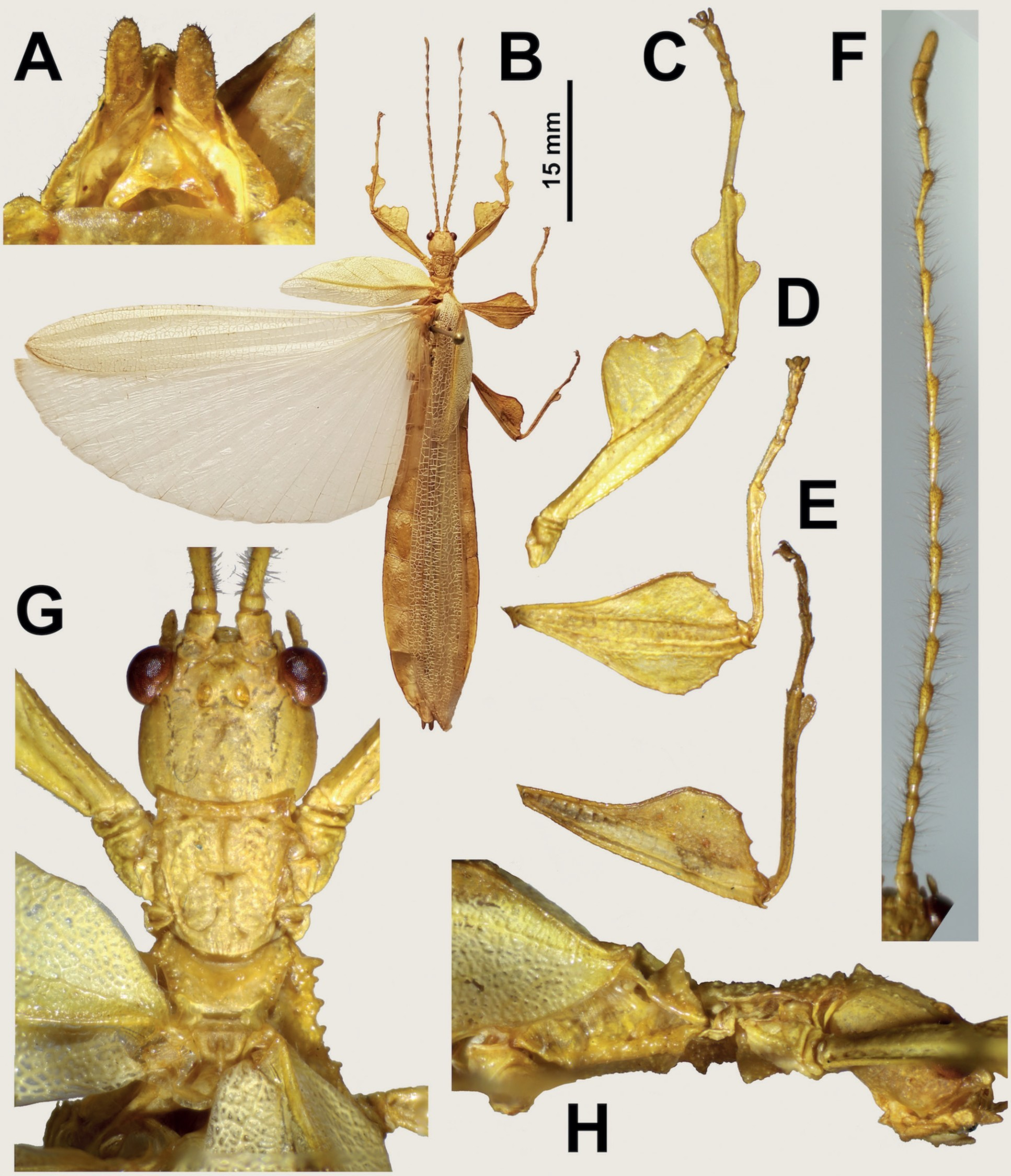
Vaabonbonphyllium rafidahae, male holotype with various close-up photographs

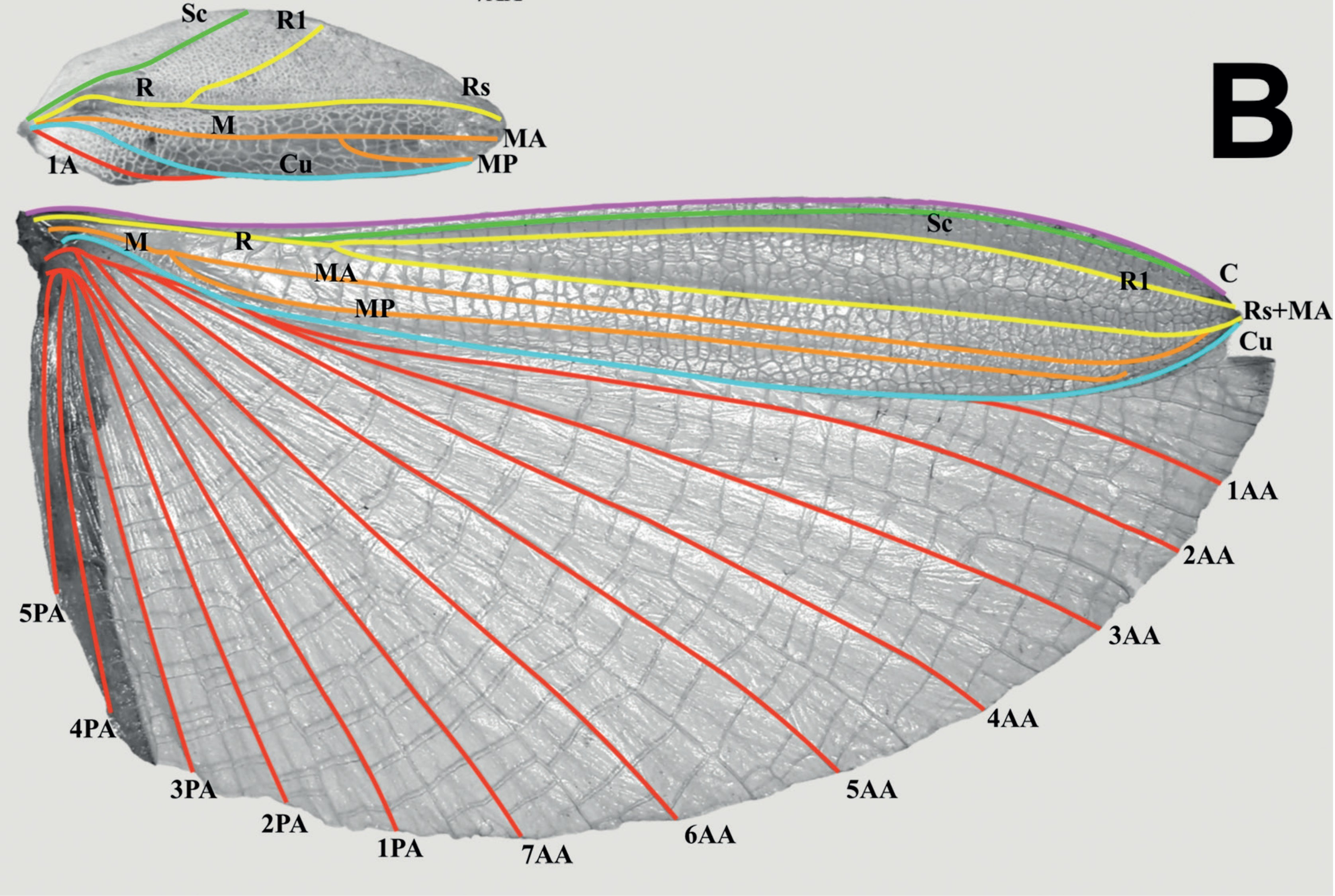
Wing venation of the male of Vaabonbonphyllium rafidahae

Vaabonbonphyllium is a genus of stick insect described in 2022, belonging to the Phylliidae (leaf insects). It comprises two species, one of which is native to the Solomon Islands and the other to Papua New Guinea.

== Description ==
The two species of Vaabonbonphyllium are small to medium-sized representatives of the leave insects. Males of Vaabonbonphyllium groesseri reach a body length of 43 millimetres (1.7 in). The only known male of Vaabonbonphyllium rafidahae is slightly larger at 53 millimetres (2.1 in). Females of Vaabonbonphyllium groesseri grow to about 70 millimetres (2.8 in) in length. Their abdomen has a maximum width of 40 millimetres (1.6 in). Females of Vaabonbonphyllium rafidahae are not known.

Both sexes possess lobes on the inner edge of the tibae of the forelegs (interior protibial lobes), which do not extend over the entire shaft length, but only cover the proximal half to a maximum of four-fifths of the length. On the outer sides of the forelegs' tibiae, there are two lobes: a smaller one at the distal end and a larger one near the midpoint. Lobes are almost entirely absent from the tibae of the mid and hind legs. Only the outer distal ends may be slightly enlarged or exhibit small to medium-sized lobes.

The forewings (tegmina) of females are long, reaching to the eighth or ninth abdominal segment, while the tegmina of males are of medium length, reaching to the third abdominal segment. The hindwings (alae) of females are greatly reduced and only recognizable as rudimentary stubs. The alae of males are fully developed, oval-fan-shaped, and extend slightly beyond the last abdominal segment.

The shape of the abdomen varies. In females of Vaabonbonphyllium groesseri, the abdomen appears nearly rectangular, with parallel-sided fourth to sixth segments. The seventh segment is strongly lobed and tapers towards the eighth, narrower, and weakly lobed segment. The abdomen of males of Vaabonbonphyllium groesseri widens slightly towards the fourth segment and considerably towards the sixth. The seventh segment is variable, as it can either taper towards the tip of the abdomen or be lobed, depending on the individual. In males of Vaabonbonphyllium rafidahae, the abdominal shape is simple. All segments are of similar width, and the margins are nearly parallel, giving the abdomen a narrow, blade-like appearance.

The arrangement and expression of certain longitudinal veins of the forewings (tegmina) are considered as autapomorphic characteristics of the genus. In females, the first radial vein (R1) of the tegmina branches off from the radius early, namely after about one-third of the distance between the wing base and the radius-media cross vein (R-M) or the bend to the radial sector. In all other leave insects, the first radial vein branches off from the radius only halfway or more than halfway between the wing base and the radius-media cross vein or the bend to the radial sector, or even later. In males, the median vein (M) of the tegmina runs parallel to the radial sector (Rs) at a distance of several vein widths, and the posterior median vein (MP) divides in the distal half of the tegmina, immediately turns, and then runs parallel to the anterior median vein (MA) to the wingtip. In contrast, in other genera of leave insects, the median and radial veins typically run side by side, either touching completely or almost touching, and the posterior branch(es) of the median vein divide(s) in the proximal half or near the midpoint of the wing length and run diverging, thus not parallel from the posterior media to the wing margin, i.e., not to the wingtip.

== Occurrence ==
The distribution area of the genus Vaabonbonphyllium is in the Solomon Islands and Papua New Guinea. Vaabonbonphyllium groesseri has been recorded in the Solomon Islands of Bougainville, Kolombangara, Nggela, Guadalcanal, and Malaita. The only known male of Vaabonbonphyllium rafidahae comes from Papua New Guinea, specifically from Mount Hagen, in the Western Highlands Province.

== Taxonomy ==
As early as 2009, Frank H. Hennemann et al. proposed the division of Phyllium and its then-existing subgenera into species groups. Phyllium groesseri, described by Oliver Zompro in 1998, was placed in the frondosum species group along with five other species. At that time, all six species were classified in the subgenus Pulchriphyllium. While the other five species have been assigned to the genus Nanophyllium since 2020, Phyllium groesseri was transferred to Pulchriphyllium in 2021, which was granted genus status. Royce T. Cumming and Stéphane Le Tirant transferred it as the type species to their newly established genus Vaabonbonphyllium in 2022. At the same time, Vaabonbonphyllium rafidahae was described as the second species of this genus.

The name "Vaabonbonphyllium" means "leaf waiting for the night" and is composed of the Latinized name Phyllium, the type genus of the family (from the Greek φυλλον, -ου (phyllon, -oy)), and the prefix "vaabonbon" from the Teop language of Papua New Guinea, meaning "waiting for the night." The name is intended to honor the indigenous people of Bougainville Island, the type locality of the genus, who speak the Teop language, and to indicate that these insects are exceptionally well camouflaged and nocturnal. They remain motionless during the day and are therefore extremely rare and little known in collections. Like Phyllium, Vaabonbonphyllium is also neuter.

The genus Vaabonbonphyllium currently comprises the following two species:

- Vaabonbonphyllium groesseri (Zompro, 1998)
- Vaabonbonphyllium rafidahae (Cumming & Le Tirant, 2022)

Cumming and Le Tirant justify the separation of the genus Vaabonbonphyllium from Pulchriphyllium, among other things, with the relationships within the Phyllioidea, which they present in their work. The justification is based on morphological and molecular genetic differences. The latter refers to investigations in previous studies, in which, however, none of the later Vaabonbonphyllium species were examined. Males of both Vaabonbonphyllium species and females of Vaabonbonphyllium groesseri were included in the morphological analysis. The phylogenetic classification of the genus Vaabonbonphyllium was carried out using Bayesian inference, which in this case means based on morphological characteristics. Accordingly, Vaabonbonphyllium is more closely related to the genera Chitoniscus, Rakaphyllium, and Pulchriphyllium than to any other genera (see also Cladogram of the Phylliidae).
