= Microphyllium =

Scientific classification
- Kingdom: Animalia
- Phylum: Arthropoda
- Clade: Pancrustacea
- Class: Insecta
- Order: Phasmatodea
- Suborder: Euphasmatodea
- Superfamily: Phyllioidea
- Family: Phylliidae
- Tribe: Phylliini
- Genus: Microphyllium; Zompro, 2001

Type species
- Microphyllium spinithorax Zompro, 2001

Species
- Microphyllium haskelli; Microphyllium spinithorax

Genus of stick insects

Microphyllium is a genus of stick insects belonging to the Phylliidae (leaf insects), described in 2001 that is endemic to the Philippine island of Luzon. Besides the type species, only one other species is currently assigned to the genus.

== Description ==
Males of the genus Microphyllium reach a length of only 24.2 to 26.7 millimetres (0.95 to 1.05 in). The widest part of the body is located approximately at the posterior margin of the metathorax; from there, the abdomen gradually tapers towards the tip. Their antennae consist of 20 to 21 segments. They are roughly equal in length to the extended forelegs or shorter and appear very short when compared to the antennae of the otherwise similar Pseudomicrophyllium males, which are significantly longer than the extended forelegs. The individual antennal segments are short and arranged like beads on a string. They are at most twice as long as they are wide. The forewings (tegmina) of the males are comparatively long relative to the hindwings (alae), reaching the third or fourth abdominal segment. The alae themselves extend to the posterior margin of the eighth abdominal segment or to the middle of the ninth. The lobes typical of many leaf insects are greatly reduced in Microphyllium males. They are entirely absent from the tibiae, and on the femura, only very narrow inner and outer lobes (meso- and metafemoral interior and exterior lobes) are discernible on the mid- and hindlegs. On the forelegs, only very narrow inner lobes (profemoral interior lobes) featuring three distinct teeth are visible.

An adult female is only known of Microphyllium haskelli. Excluding the antennae, it measures 40.5 millimetres (1.59 in) in length. The central spine on the prescutum is the largest, while the posteriormost spine is greatly reduced. Unlike females of Pseudomicrophyllium, the third antennal segment lacks a stridulatory ridge. The tegmina extend to the posterior margin of the seventh abdominal segment. The hind wings (alae) are reduced. The abdomen widens evenly up to the end of the fourth abdominal segment, where it measures a good 20 millimetres (0.79 in) in width. From the fifth abdominal segment onwards, the abdomen tapers evenly before ending in a nearly pointed tip. The subgenital plate, representing the eighth sternum, is short and terminates in a rounded tip. The gonapophyses are short and protrude only slightly beyond the subgenital plate. The fore tibiae lack outer lobes, and the inner lobes (protibial interior lobes) are also greatly reduced. The inner lobes of the fore femora (profemoral interior lobes) are obtuse, angled and bear three small teeth.

== Occurrence ==
The currently known distribution of the genus Microphyllium is limited to the Philippine island of Luzon. While it is known only that Microphyllium spinithorax occurs on Luzon, more precise locality data exist for Microphyllium haskelli from the north of the island; the species has been found in Mountain Province on both Mount Barlig and Mount Polis.

== Taxonomy ==
Oliver Zompro described the genus based on three specimens of the type species, Microphyllium spinithorax, which was described at the same time. All three originated from the Staatliches Museum fur Tierkunde Dresden (now the Museum für Tierkunde Dresden), where they are deposited. While the male holotype is adult, the two female paratypes are nymphs at the L4 and L5 stages, respectively, and both lack antennae and forelegs. A species originally described in 1933 by James Abram Garfield Rehn and his son John William Holman Rehn as Phyllium pusillulum, based on a 47 millimetres (1.9 in) long female was assigned to the genus Microphyllium in 2009 by Frank H. Hennemann et al. following a comparison with the female paratypes of Microphyllium spinithorax. Hennemann et al. considered it possible that the two might represent the same species. In 2017, Royce T. Cumming et al. described another species in the genus, Microphyllium haskelli. In the same paper, Cumming established the genus Pseudomicrophyllium and described its type species, Pseudomicrophyllium faulkneri, based on a male specimen. The original description and images of the female holotype of the species originally described as Phyllium pusillulum (now Microphyllium pusillulum) were also included in the paper. Molecular genetic analyses conducted by Sarah Bank et al. involved sequencing samples of Microphyllium pusillulum and the holotype of Pseudomicrophyllium faulkneri. The samples proved to be conspecific, and in 2021, Pseudomicrophyllium faulkneri was synonymized with the older species name; it was reclassified as Pseudomicrophyllium pusillulum and thus no longer belongs to the genus Microphyllium.

The name "Microphyllium" means "(very) small leaf" and is composed of the Latinized name Phyllium, the type genus of the family (from the Greek φυλλον, -ου (phyllon, -oy)), and the prefix "Micro-," meaning "small" or "very small". The name was chosen because the species in this genus are among the smallest of the leaf insects. Like Phyllium, Microphyllium is also neuter.

The genus Microphyllium currently comprises the following two species:

- Microphyllium haskelli Cumming, 2017
- Microphyllium spinithorax Zompro, 2001 – type species

In their 2021 study on the phylogeny and historical biogeography of leaf insects, Bank et al. examined a specimen of Microphyllium haskelli alongside many other samples of leaf insects, including two specimens of the extant Pseudomicrophyllium pusillulum. The results of these analyses demonstrated that Microphyllium is the sister genus of Pseudomicrophyllium. Together, these two genera form a clade with Pulchriphyllium, at the next higher level, this clade includes the genus Phyllium (see also Cladogram of the Phylliidae).
