= Pseudomicrophyllium geryon =

Scientific classification
- Domain: Eukaryota
- Kingdom: Animalia
- Phylum: Arthropoda
- Class: Insecta
- Order: Phasmatodea
- Family: Phylliidae
- Genus: Pseudomicrophyllium
- Species: P. geryon

Binomial name
- Pseudomicrophyllium geryon (G. R. Gray, 1843)

Synonyms
- Phyllium geryon G. R. Gray, 1843

Species of leaf insect

Pseudomicrophyllium geryon is a species of phasmid or leaf insect. It is found in the Philippines, Java, and Sri Lanka.
