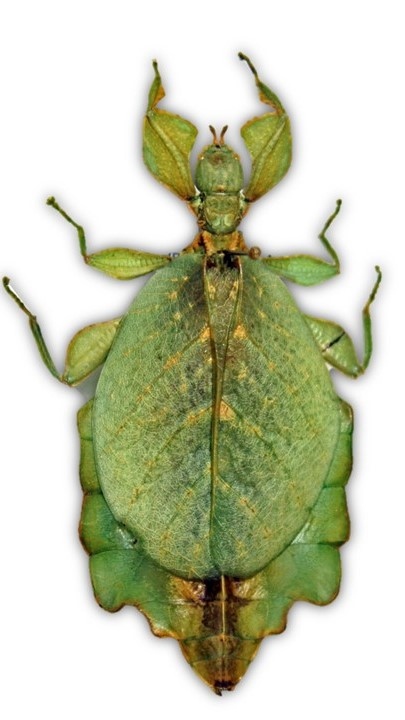
- Trolicaphyllium sarrameaense female

Scientific classification
- Kingdom: Animalia
- Phylum: Arthropoda
- Clade: Pancrustacea
- Class: Insecta
- Order: Phasmatodea
- Family: Phylliidae
- Tribe: Phylliini
- Genus: Trolicaphyllium; Cumming, Le Tirant & Büscher, 2021

Type species
- Trolicaphyllium brachysoma (Sharp, 1898)

Species
- Trolicaphyllium brachysoma; Trolicaphyllium erosum; Trolicaphyllium sarrameaense

= Trolicaphyllium =

Leaf insect genus, phyllium

Trolicaphyllium is a genus of leaf insect in the order Phasmatodea native to New Caledonia and the small surrounding islands. The species listed in this genus were listed in Chitoniscus until 2021, whose representatives originate from the Fiji Islands.

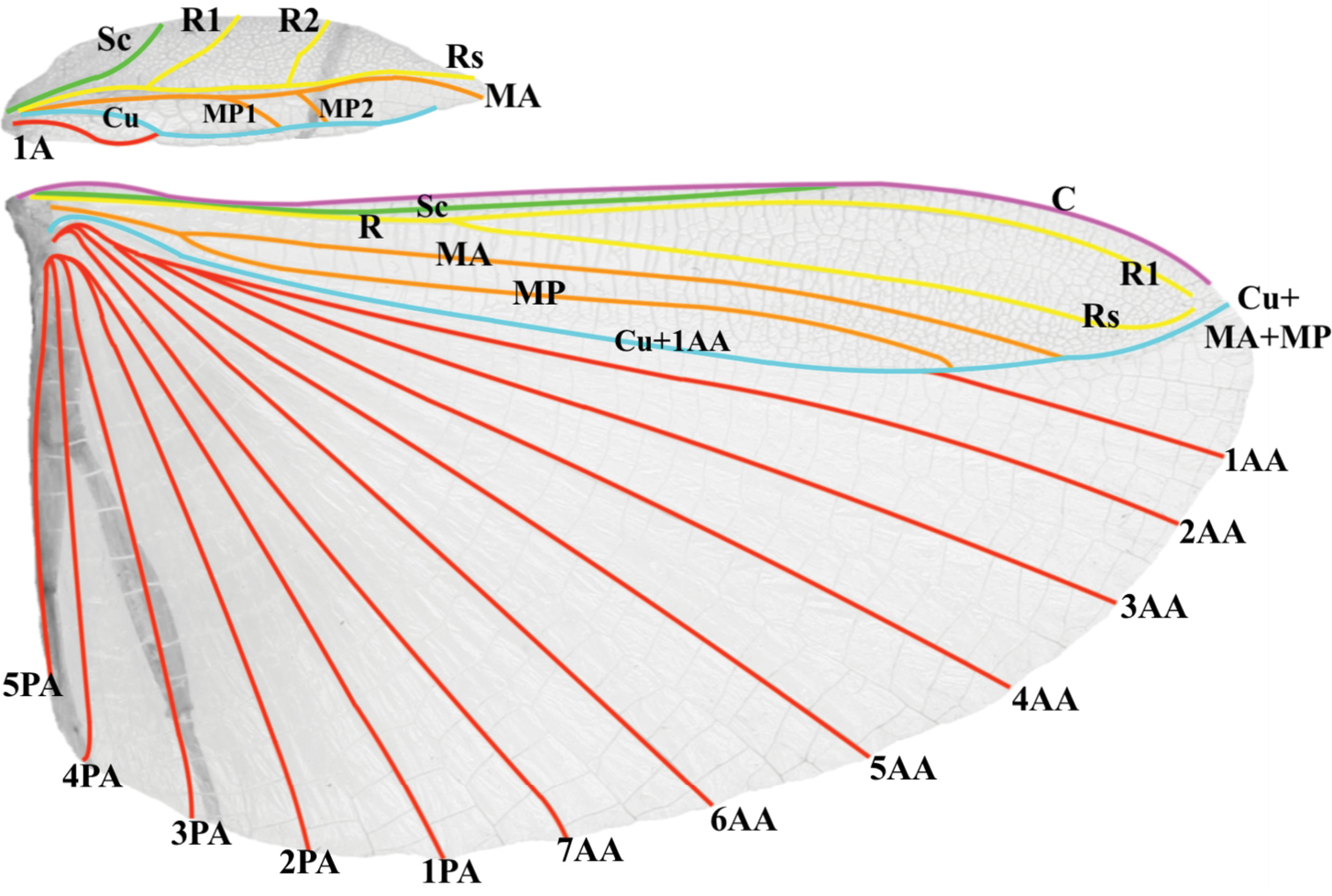
Wing venation of a male of Trolicaphyllium cf. brachysoma

== Description ==
Trolicaphyllium species are relatively small and broad representatives of leaf insect, with a body length of 42 to 60 millimetres (1.7 to 2.4 in) in females and 38.5 to 43.5 millimetres (1.52 to 1.71 in) in males. Their abdomen is either pointed or strongly lobed in both sexes. Their eggs are small and lack pinnae. In these morphological characteristics, they resemble members of the genus Chitoniscus, which is why they were long classified in this genus. The similarities likely arose through convergence. Differences exist in the development of the inner lobe of the tibae of the forelegs (interior protibial lobes), which in Trolicaphyllium extends over the entire shaft of the inner foretibiae, while in Chitoniscus it is either completely absent in both sexes or present only in the proximal half. In females, there are differences in the structure of the antennae, whose segments three, eight, and nine are broadened in Trolicaphyllium females, while this is not the case in Chitoniscus females. The basic coloration of both sexes is usually green. Besides the typically green females, yellowish-green to orange females have also been described and illustrated. The coxae in females of Trolicaphyllium are a similar color to the rest of the body, while in females of Chitoniscus they are a striking sky blue. Males of Trolicaphyllium, like those of many leaf insect species, have three ocelli on the vertex between the compound eyes, which are absent in males of Chitoniscus.

The autapomorphic characteristics of the genus include the comb-like projections of the second and third Euplantulae of tarses in females, each extending over the entire tarsomere. In males, the wing venation is unique among leaf insects, as the medio-anterior and media-posterior veins merge at different points on the cubitus before running together to the wing margin.

== Occurrence ==
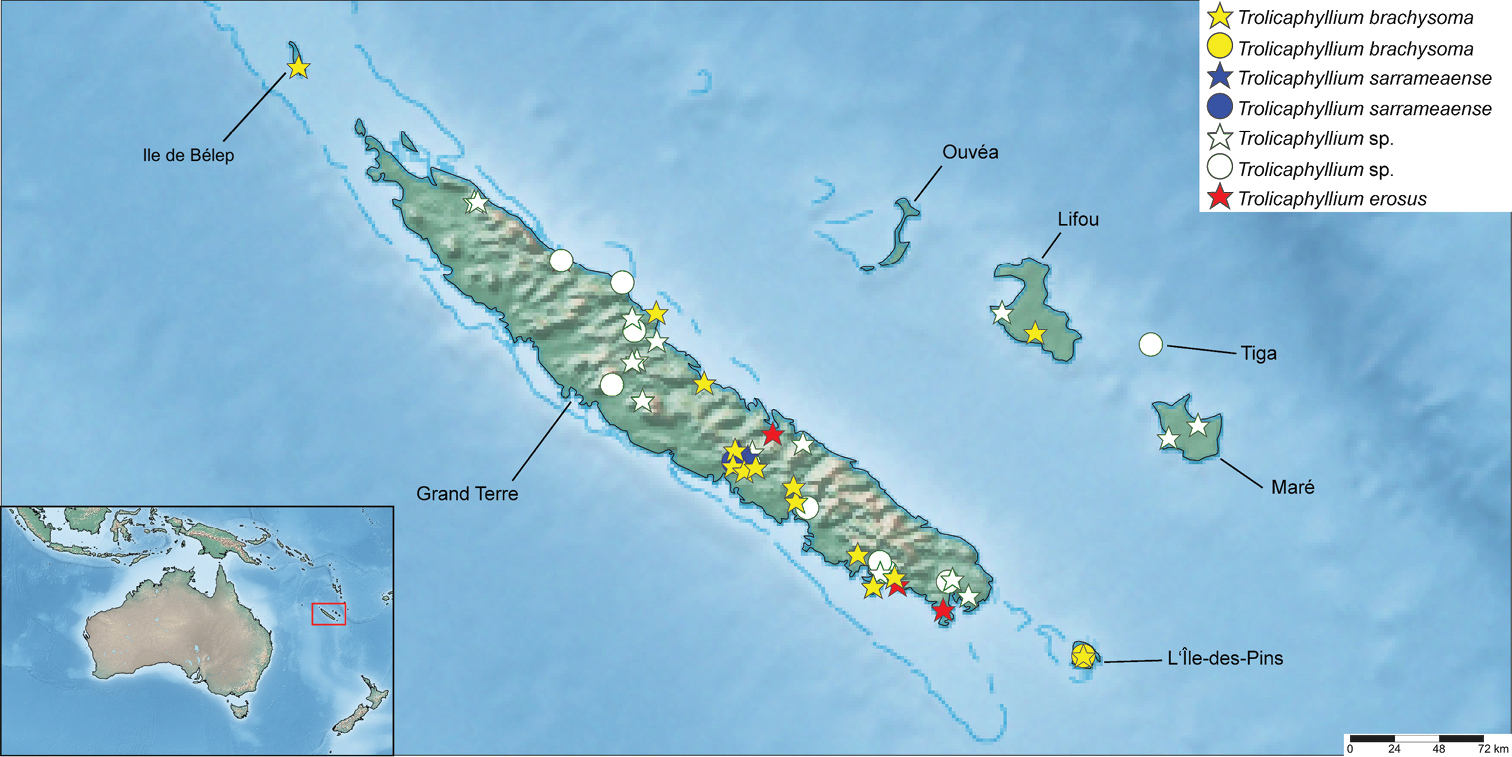
Distribution of Trolicaphyllium (stars = locations of collection specimens, circles = photographic observations)

The distribution area of the genus Trolicaphyllium is limited to New Caledonia, where representatives have been found on the islands of Grande Terre, Lifou, Tiga, Maré, L'Île-des-Pins, and the Belep Islands. In addition to the three known species, numerous nymphs of the genus have also been found that cannot be definitively assigned to any one of the species (labeled Trolicaphyllium sp. on the distribution map).

== Taxonomy ==
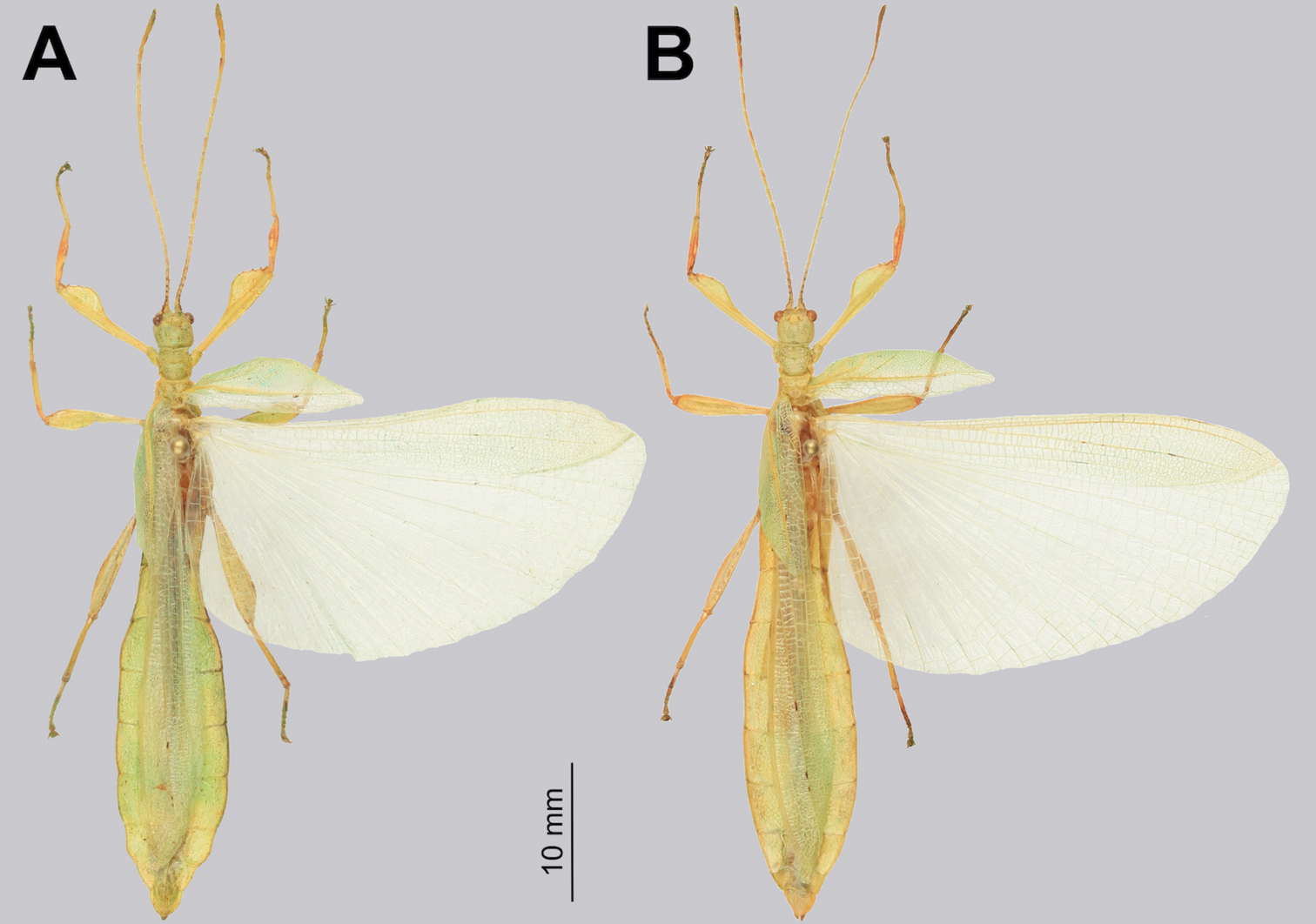
Males of Trolicaphyllium cf. brachysoma

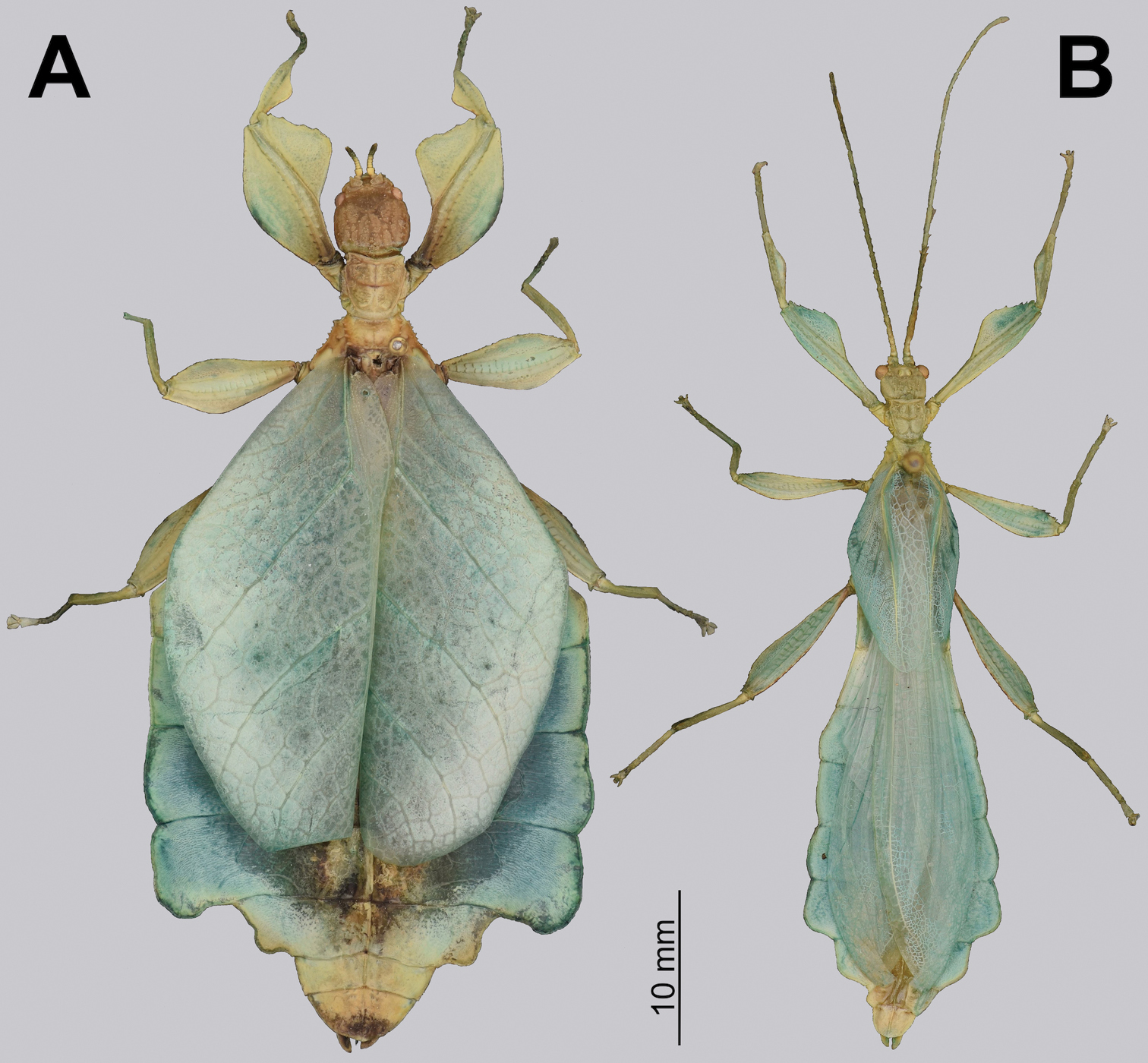
Trolicaphyllium sarrameaense, female holotype and male paratype

Royce T. Cumming, Stéphane Le Tirant, and Thies H. Büscher separated the genus in 2021 from the genus Chitoniscus, which had already been described by Carl Stål in 1875. The name "Trolicaphyllium" means "silently wandering leaf" and is composed of the Latinized name Phyllium, the type genus of the family (from the Greek φυλλον, -ου (phyllon, -oy)), and the prefix "trolica" from the Drehu language, meaning "to wander silently". The name is intended to honor the indigenous people of this area by using a local traditional language and to indicate that these insects live shyly and silently in the trees, where they are often overlooked. Like Phyllium, Trolicaphyllium is also neuter.

The type species of the genus is Trolicaphyllium brachysoma, described by David Sharp in 1898 as Phyllium brachysoma and known as Chitoniscus brachysoma from 1904 to 2021. Trolicaphyllium erosus, described by Josef Redtenbacher in 1906 as Chitoniscus erosus, and Trolicaphyllium sarrameaense, described by Detlef Größer in 2008 as Chitoniscus sarrameaense, are also included in the genus.

The genus Vaabonbonphyllium currently comprises the following species:

- Trolicaphyllium brachysoma (Sharp, 1898) - type species
- Trolicaphyllium erosum (Redtenbacher, 1906)
- Trolicaphyllium sarrameaense (Grösser, 2008)

Cumming, Le Tirant, and Büscher justify the split of the genus Trolicaphyllium from Chitoniscus, among other things, with the relationships within the Phyllioidea, which were examined in a study on the phylogeny of leaf insects published earlier in 2021. In this study, Sarah Bank, Cumming, and others demonstrated, using molecular genetic analyses, that two samples of the present-day Chitoniscus, namely, Chitoniscus feejeeanus and an as-yet-undescribed species from Suva, which is named Chitoniscus sp. 'Suva' after its discovery location and two samples of the present-day Trolicaphyllium, namely, Trolicaphyllium brachysoma and Trolicaphyllium sarrameaense, each belong to a separate clade. These two clades are comparatively distant from each other. Therefore, Trolicaphyllium and Chitoniscus are more closely related to other genera than to each other. Thus, Trolicaphyllium is more closely related to the genera Comptaphyllium, Acentetaphyllium and Nanophyllium than to any other genera (see also Cladogram of the Phylliidae).
