= Pseudomicrophyllium =

Scientific classification
- Kingdom: Animalia
- Phylum: Arthropoda
- Clade: Pancrustacea
- Class: Insecta
- Order: Phasmatodea
- Suborder: Euphasmatodea
- Superfamily: Phyllioidea
- Family: Phylliidae
- Tribe: Phylliini
- Genus: Pseudomicrophyllium; Cumming, 2017

Type species
- Pseudomicrophyllium pusillulum Rehn, J.A.G. & Rehn, J.W.H., 1934)

Species
- Pseudomicrophyllium pusillulum; Pseudomicrophyllium geryon

Genus of stick insects

Pseudomicrophyllium is a genus of stick insects belonging to the Phylliidae (leaf insects), described in 2017. One of the two species currently assigned to this genus is similarly small to members of the genus Microphyllium, and like them both Pseudomicrophyllium species are endemic to the Philippine island of Luzon.

== Description ==
Females of Pseudomicrophyllium pusillulum reach a body length of 42.3 to 47.0 millimetres (1.67 to 1.85 in). Females of Pseudomicrophyllium geryon are significantly larger, measuring 62.0 to 65.7 millimetres (2.44 to 2.59 in) respectively. The posteriormost spine of the prescutum is the most prominent, whereas in Microphyllium females, the middle spine is the largest. In Pseudomicrophyllium females, the third antennal segment features a stridulatory ridge, a structure absent in the antennae of Microphyllium females. The forewings (tegmina) extend to the posterior margin of the seventh abdominal segment. The hindwings (alae) are reduced. The subgenital plate - the eighth abdominal sternum - forms a small point that barely extends beyond the posterior margin of the ninth abdominal segment. The gonapophyses are long, reaching the tip of the final abdominal segment. The foreleg tibiae lack outer lobes, and the inner lobes (protibial interior lobes) are also greatly reduced, forming only a small, proximally located triangle. The inner lobes on the foreleg femura (profemoral interior lobes) are right - to obtuse - angled and bear three to four teeth. The base coloration of females of both species is green. Pseudomicrophyllium pusillulum, for which the coloration in life is also known, displays two to three indistinct, grey-brown, posteriorly directed stripes on the tegmina that mimic leaf veins. Similar patterns appear on the outer posterior margins of the abdominal segments.

One male of Pseudomicrophyllium pusillulum is the only known male of the genus Pseudomicrophyllium. It measures 27.8 millimetres (1.09 in) in length, making it only slightly larger than males of the genus Microphyllium. Its antennae consist of 23 segments, each four to five times as long as wide; at 20.1 millimetres (0.79 in) in length, they are significantly longer than the extended forelegs. In contrast, the antennae of Microphyllium males are equal in length to, or shorter than, their extended forelegs. Unlike in Microphyllium males, where the body is widest at the posterior margin of the metathorax, the widest point here is at the posterior margin of the fourth abdominal segment, measuring 5.9 millimetres (0.23 in) across. The third and fourth abdominal segments gradually widen up to this point, after which the abdomen tapers evenly toward the tip. Overall, the male of Pseudomicrophyllium pusillulum thus resembles that of a small Phyllium species. The tegmina measure 8.3 millimetres (0.33 in) in length and barely reach the third abdominal segment, whereas the alae extend nearly to the tip of the abdomen. The lobes on the legs of Pseudomicrophyllium males are greatly reduced; they are entirely absent from the tibiae. The lobes on the forefemora are reduced to a single distal spine on the inner side (profemoral interior lobes).

== Occurrence ==
The currently known distribution range of the genus Pseudomicrophyllium is - like that of the genus Microphyllium - restricted to the Philippine island of Luzon. The localities for Pseudomicrophyllium pusillulum are located in the northern and central parts of Luzon: specifically in Banaue (Ifugao Province), Imugan (Nueva Vizcaya Province), and on Mount Barlig (Mountain Province). The locality for the female holotype of Pseudomicrophyllium geryon is recorded simply as "Philippines". Another female was collected in 2017 in Dingalan (Aurora Province); this location is thus significantly further south than those of Pseudomicrophyllium pusillulum.

== Taxonomy ==
In 2017, Royce T. Cumming described the genus and its type species, Pseudomicrophyllium faulkneri, based on a single male specimen. Cumming facilitated a molecular genetic analysis of this specimen - which had been deposited as the holotype - using its left hind leg. Results published by Sarah Bank et al. in 2021 revealed that this specimen was conspecific with Microphyllium pusillulum - a species previously known only from females - a sample of which was also analyzed. Consequently, Pseudomicrophyllium faulkneri was synonymized with the older species, which was simultaneously transferred to the genus Pseudomicrophyllium as Pseudomicrophyllium pusillulum. This species had originally been described as Phyllium pusillulum in 1934 by James Abram Garfield Rehn and his son, John William Holman Rehn. In 2009, Frank H. Hennemann et al. had transferred it to the genus Microphyllium after comparing it with the paratypes of Microphyllium spinithorax - two female nymphs at the L4 and L5 stages. Shortly after the synonymization of Pseudomicrophyllium faulkneri, Cumming et al. described another valid leaf insect species with the same specific epithet: Cryptophyllium faulkneri. This can lead to confusion when referring to Pseudomicrophyllium faulkneri. The results from Bank et al. also indicated the existence of another species within the genus Pseudomicrophyllium: Phyllium geryon, originally described by George Robert Gray in 1843. Since its description, this species had consistently been classified within the genus Phyllium, and since 2001, within its nominate subgenus, Phyllium. While Hennemann et al. placed it in the close relationship of Phyllium siccifolium - specifically, the Siccifolium species group - in 2009, Rehn and Rehn had already suspected as early as 1934 that Phyllium geryon was closely related to Phyllium pusillulum, a fact that was ultimately confirmed.

The genus Pseudomicrophyllium currently comprises the following two species:

- Pseudomicrophyllium geryon (Gray, R.G., 1843)
- Pseudomicrophyllium pusillulum (Rehn, J.A.G. & Rehn, J.W.H., 1934) – type species (as Pseudomicrophyllium faulkneri Cumming, 2017)

The name "Pseudomicrophyllium" means "false (very) small leaf" and is composed of the Latinized name Phyllium (from the Greek φυλλον, -ου (phyllon, -oy) + -um, meaning "leaf") and the prefix "Micro-" (meaning "small" or "very small"), which forms the name of the genus Microphyllium. The prefix "Pseudo-" (from the Greek "pseudes", meaning "false") was added because the holotype of the type species - originating from Cummings's collection - was for years mistaken for a new Microphyllium species due to its size and similarities, and was only recognized as a distinct genus upon closer examination. Like Phyllium and Microphyllium, Pseudomicrophyllium is neuter in gender.

In addition to clarifying the species and synonyms associated with Pseudomicrophyllium, the study by Bank et al. on the phylogeny and historical biogeography of leaf insects also demonstrated the relationships among the relevant genera. Pseudomicrophyllium was shown to be the sister genus to Microphyllium. Together with Pulchriphyllium, these two genera form a clade that, at the next higher level, includes the genus Phyllium (see also Cladogram of the Phylliidae).
