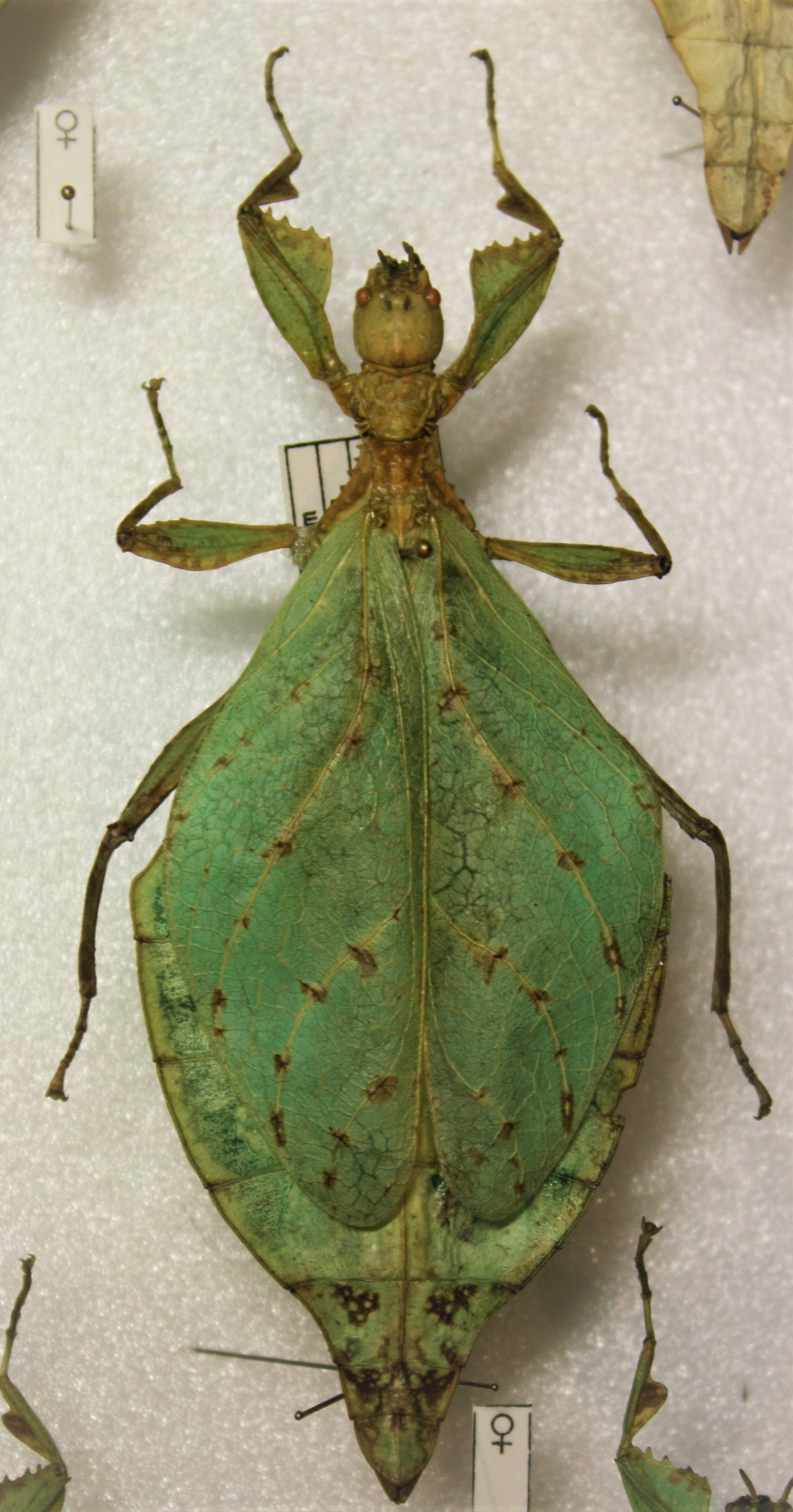
- Female of Comptaphyllium caudatum from the collection of Detlef Größer

Scientific classification
- Kingdom: Animalia
- Phylum: Arthropoda
- Clade: Pancrustacea
- Class: Insecta
- Order: Phasmatodea
- Superfamily: Phyllioidea
- Family: Phylliidae
- Tribe: Phylliini
- Genus: Comptaphyllium; Cumming, Le Tirant & Hennemann, 2019

Type species
- Comptaphyllium caudatum (Redtenbacher, 1906)

Species
- Comptaphyllium caudatum; Comptaphyllium regina; Comptaphyllium riedeli

= Comptaphyllium =

Genus of stick insects

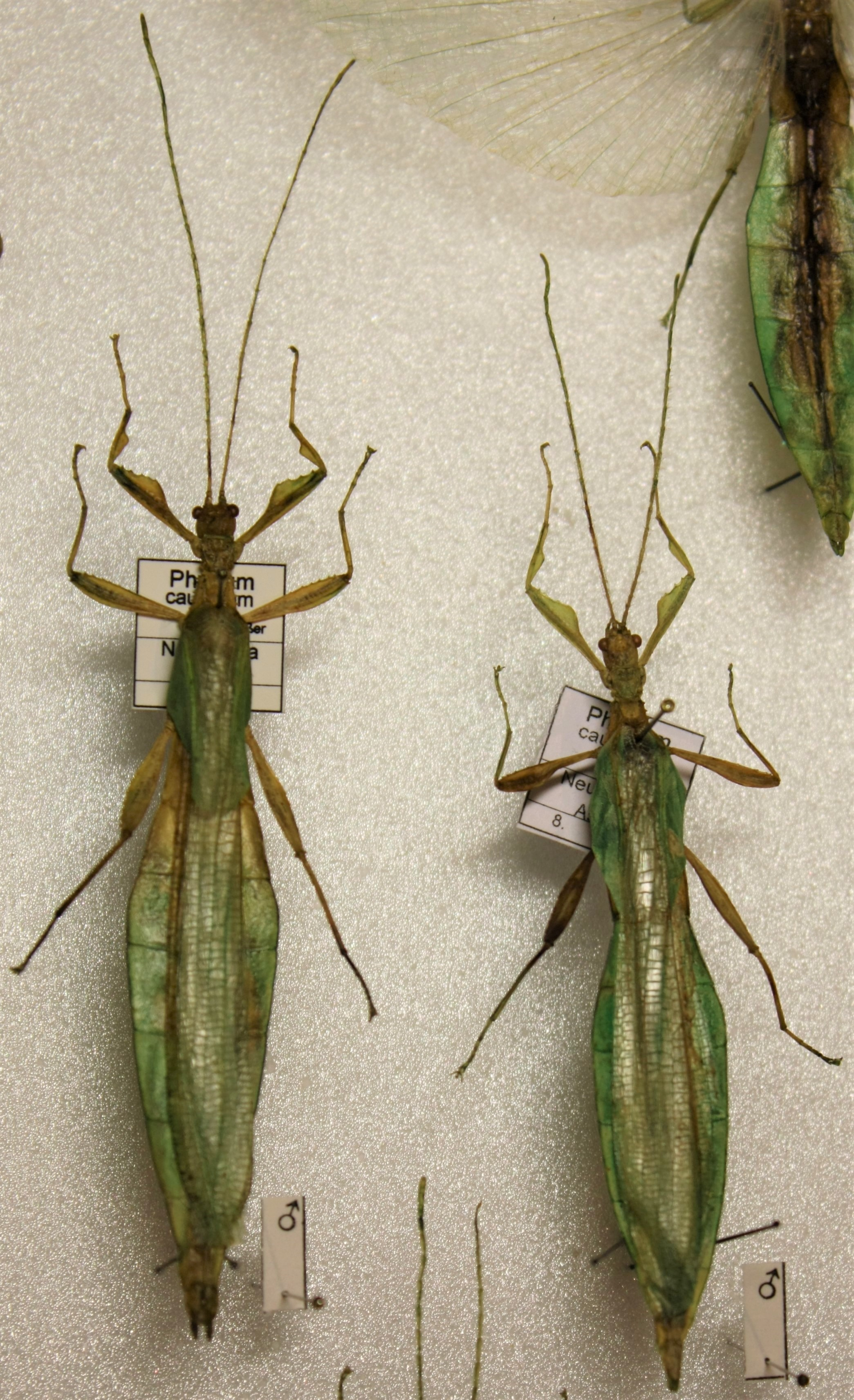
Males of Comptaphyllium caudatum

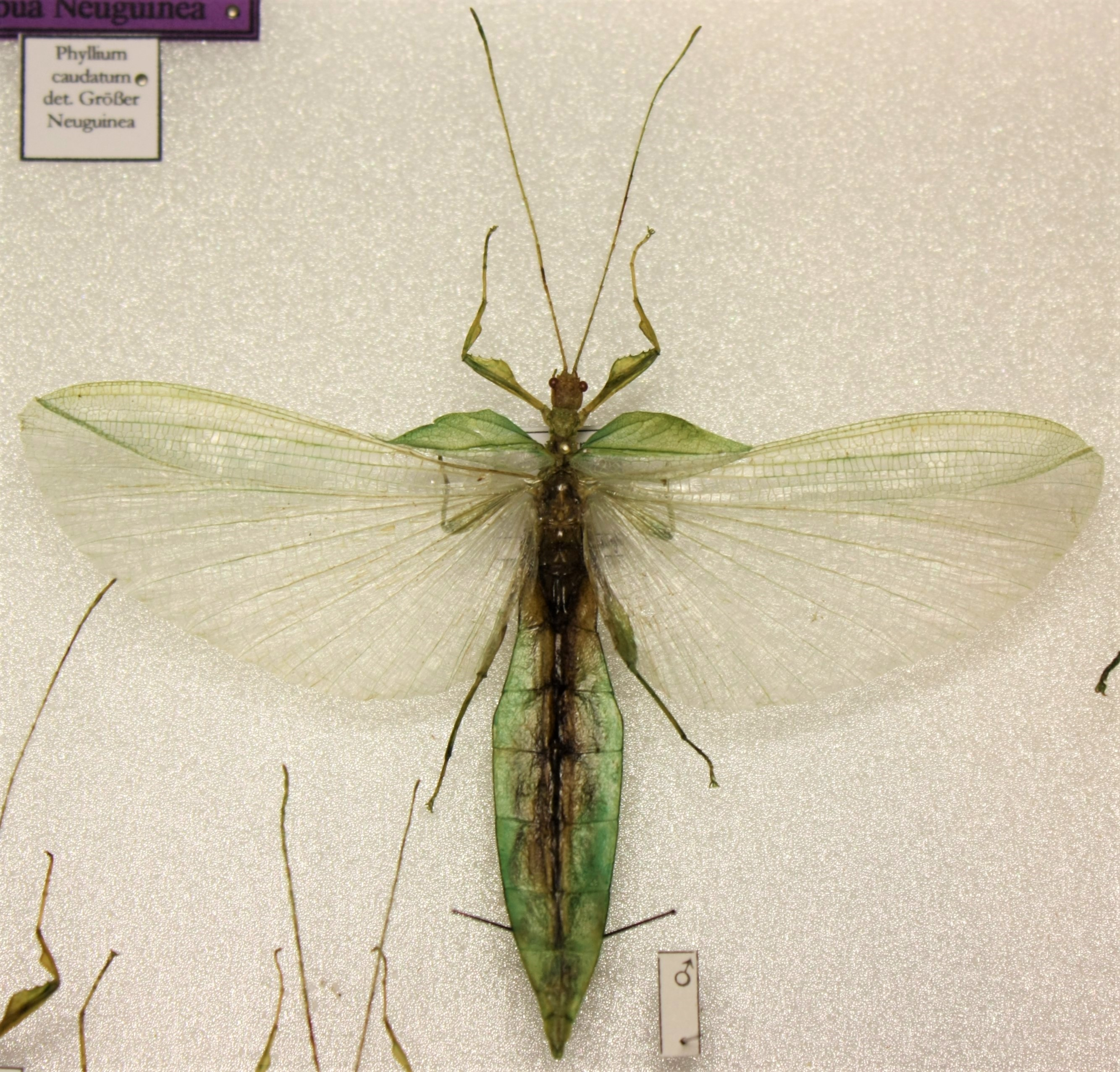
Male of Comptaphyllium caudatum with open wings

Comptaphyllium is a genus of stick insect, belonging to the Phylliidae (leaf insects). It was initially described in 2019 as a subgenus of Phyllium, which is native to New Guinea and the Moluccan island of Obi.

== Description ==
The genus Comptaphyllium comprises two smaller and one larger species of walking leaves. Females reach a body length of 56.3 to 102.7 millimetres (2.22 to 4.04 in). Males of the smaller species have been documented with body lengths of 53 to 63 millimetres (2.1 to 2.5 in). The males of the largest species, Comptaphyllium regina, are unknown. Based on the male-to-female ratio of the two smaller species, their size is estimated at 75 to 96 millimetres (3.0 to 3.8 in).

Both sexes possess lobes on the inner edge of the tibae of the forelegs (interior protibial lobes), which extend only over the proximal half to two-thirds of the tibia's length. The head capsule shows clearly defined, evenly distributed nodes. The anterior margin of the mesonotum, the so-called mesopraescutum, has a large, prominent spine. The prosternum has a distinct swelling with a granular surface. In females, the antennae are long and slender. The last antennal segment (apical antennomere IX) is as long as or longer than the three preceding segments combined. The hindwings (alae) are small, measuring 5 to 10 millimetres (0.20 to 0.39 in) in length, but present. The pleura of the mesothorax bear four or five short, rounded tubercles. In the two species of which males are known, Comptaphyllium caudatum and Comptaphyllium riedeli, the terminal segments of the abdomen are always distinctly more tapered than the preceding segments, giving the abdomen a distinctly spatulate shape. The eggs of the species of which males are known have also been described. They have long, fringed pinnae along their lateral margins. The operculum has a medial row of pinnae in the sagittal plane that does not surround the operculum's edge.

== Occurrence and way of life ==
The known distribution of the genus Comptaphyllium currently includes New Guinea and the Moluccan island of Obi. The only known specimen of Comptaphyllium regina, the female holotype, comes from Obi Island. The two smaller species occur in New Guinea. Comptaphyllium caudatum is known from various locations in Papua New Guinea. It has been recorded in the Eastern Highlands Province, the Morobe Province, and the Gulf Province. In the province of Papua Pegunungan in West Papua, the Indonesian part of New Guinea, the female holotype of Comptaphyllium riedeli was found at an altitude of 1,875 metres (6,152 ft). A male of this species was collected further north in Dabra on the Buare River.

== Taxonomy ==
As early as 2009, Frank H. Hennemann et al. proposed the division of Phyllium and its then-existing subgenera into species groups. The species described in 1906 by Josef Redtenbacher as Phyllium caudatum was placed, along with 16 other species, in the siccifolium species group. Of these, 12 species remain in the genus Phyllium, while the remaining four species have been transferred to three subsequently described genera. Phyllium caudatum was transferred as the type species to Comptaphyllium, which was described as a subgenus of Phyllium by Royce T. Cumming, Stéphane Le Tirant, and Hennemann in September 2019. With the current Comptaphyllium riedeli, another species from the former genus Phyllium was transferred to this subgenus. At the same time, Cumming, Le Tirant, and Hennemann described Phyllium (Comptaphyllium) regina as the third species of the subgenus.

The name "Comptaphyllium" means "ornamented leaves" and is composed of the Latinized name Phyllium, the type genus of the family (from the Greek φυλλον, -ου (phyllon, -oy)), + -um), and the Latin prefix "compta", meaning "ornamented" or "decorated". The name was chosen because the surface of the head and thorax of these species is covered with numerous evenly distributed spines or nodes, giving them an ornamental appearance. Like Phyllium, Comptaphyllium is also neuter.

Sarah Bank et al. elevated Comptaphyllium and two other subgenera of Phyllium to the rank of genera in 2021 based on their molecular genetic studies. Two samples of Comptaphyllium caudatum were included in the studies.

The genus Comptaphyllium currently comprises the following species:

- Comptaphyllium caudatum (Redtenbacher, 1906)
- Comptaphyllium regina (Cumming, Le Tirant &Hennemann, 2019)
- Comptaphyllium riedeli (van de Kamp & Hennemann, 2014)

Cumming and Le Tirant phylogenetically classify the genus in 2022 according to molecular genetic and morphological characteristics using Bayesian inference and place it in a clade with the genera Acentetaphyllium, Nanophyllium, Trolicaphyllium and Walaphyllium (see also Cladogram of the Phylliidae).
