= Achille Griffini =

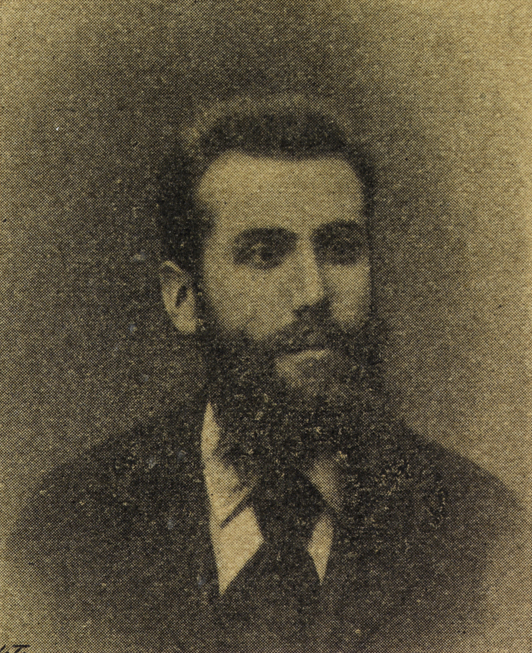

Achille Griffini (10 August 1870 – 24 June 1932) was an Italian zoologist and high school teacher who specialized in ichthyology but also took an interest in entomology. He wrote on the taxonomy of the Orthoptera, particularly the Stenopelmatidae.

Griffini was born in Milan to Eugenio and Clarissa Griffini. After being educated as a teacher he graduated in the natural sciences from the University of Turin in 1893 where he studied under Michele Lessona (1823-1894), who was among the early Italian evolutionists. He was offered a position as a teacher but having taught earlier he took up a position of assistant at the museum of zoology and comparative anatomy at the Royal University in 1895. In 1896 he was made member of the Royal Academy of Agriculture in Turin and he also took a position at the Technical Institute of Bologna. He worked in Foggia (1899-1902), Udeine (1902-1903), L'Aquila (1905-1905), Genoa, and Bologna (1910-1912). In 1913 he became a curator at the Natural History Museum of Milan, collaborated with entomologists in Germany and was involved in arranging the Gryllacrididae at the Zoological Museum of Berlin. He donated his specimen collections, particularly of beetles to the natural history museum in Genoa. During World War I he served in the 1st Engineer Regiment but was paralyzed in 1917 by an injury and he returned to teach in Bologna. He lived in Brescia from 1925 until his death. His collections were deposited at the museum of Turin.

Among his books was a popular account of zebras.

He married Marta Scialini (b. 1876) and they had a son and daughter.
