= Cryptophyllium limogesi =

- Pair of Cryptophyllium limogesi from the breeding stock from Thac Krong Kmar in Vietnam

Scientific classification
- Kingdom: Animalia
- Phylum: Arthropoda
- Clade: Pancrustacea
- Class: Insecta
- Order: Phasmatodea
- Superfamily: Phyllioidea
- Family: Phylliidae
- Tribe: Phylliini
- Genus: Cryptophyllium
- Species: C. limogesi

Binomial name
- Cryptophyllium limogesi Cumming et al., 2021

Species of leaf insect

Cryptophyllium limogesi is a species of stick insects belonging to the Phylliidae (leaf insects) described in 2021, alongside twelve other species within the genus Cryptophyllium, which was established at the same time. It is native to Vietnam. A captive-bred strain originating from Thac Krong Kmar in Đắk Lắk province has been kept by enthusiasts since 2021.

== Description ==
=== Females ===
Females of Cryptophyllium limogesi reach lengths of 95 to 105 millimetres (3.7 to 4.1 in), making them among the largest females in the genus, alongside those of Cryptophyllium daparo, Cryptophyllium tibetense and Cryptophyllium faulkneri. Morphologically, they most closely resemble Cryptophyllium celebicum and Cryptophyllium tibetense, as they share the feature of broad, acute-angled outer lobes (profemoral exterior lobes) on the foreleg femora and possess a box-shaped abdomen. Females of Cryptophyllium limogesi can be distinguished from Cryptophyllium celebicum by the shape of the pleurae (mesopleurae) of the mesothorax. In Cryptophyllium limogesi the margins remain straight almost up to the anterior edge of the prescutum, whereas in Cryptophyllium celebicum females, they are distinctly narrower in the anterior half. They can be divided from Cryptophyllium tibetense by the subgenital plate (epiproct), located at the end of the eighth dorsal abdominal segment (eighth abdominal tergite). In Cryptophyllium tibetense, the subgenital plate is long and pointed, extending beyond the end of the last abdominal segment. In Cryptophyllium limogesi, the subgenital plate is short, reaching at most the middle of the last abdominal segment. The coloration of the dorsal side, including the forewings (tegmina), is a uniform mint green. On the underside, the females are also uniformly colored but display a slightly more intense or darker green. The tegmina reach the anterior margin of the seventh abdominal segment. Their venation exhibits the arrangement and characteristics typical of females in this genus. Unlike the long, well-developed hindwings (alae) found in most Cryptophyllium females, those of Cryptophyllium limogesi are relatively short, reaching a length of only about 22 millimetres (0.87 in).

=== Males ===
Males of Cryptophyllium limogesi reach a length of approximately 79 to 80 millimetres (3.1 to 3.1 in). Morphologically, they resemble Cryptophyllium oyae, sharing features such as a broad, spatulate abdomen and a similar shape of the lobes on the forefemora (profemoral lobes). The two species can be distinguished by the length of their tegmina: in Cryptophyllium limogesi, they extend only as far as the third abdominal segment, whereas in Cryptophyllium oyae, they reach the middle of the fourth segment. Additionally, the shape of the mesopleura differs; in Cryptophyllium oyae, they are broad with nearly straight margins, while in Cryptophyllium limogesi males, they are somewhat narrower in the anterior region. The coloration of the males is similar to that of the females. The margins of the femoral lobes and the terminal segments of the antennae often exhibit a subtle light-brown hue. A pair of eyespots is usually present on the fifth abdominal segment, though these are typically concealed by the wings.

Eggs from: A lateral, B dorsal, C ventral, D opercular (top)

=== Eggs ===
The eggs of Cryptophyllium limogesi conform to the box-like type most common within the genus. Only when viewed from above (the opercular end) or below does it become apparent that their cross-section is pentagonal, even though they appear like rectangular cuboid macroscopically. They measure approximately 5.2 millimetres (0.20 in) in length and about 3.8 millimetres (0.15 in) in both width and height. The surfaces and edges of the egg capsule are slightly undulated, giving the egg an overall bumpy and uneven appearance. A keel is visible in the ventral view, dividing this side into two ventrolateral regions. Three evenly spaced pits are located on either side of this keel. These are also visible from a lateral perspective and are complemented in the dorsal region by two additional, closely spaced pits. Thus, five pits can be seen from the side; the anterior pit, the two middle pits, and the posterior pit are arranged along a line that curves slightly dorsally. The ventrolateral regions are largely bare, featuring isolated, short, moss-like leaflets, known as pinnae (from the Latin for fin or wing) only between the pits. The dorsal side features a total of seven medium-sized pits: one at the anterior end near the tip of the micropylar plate, two on each side of the micropylar plate, and another pair slightly below the micropylar plate near the base of the capsule. Like the ventral pits, the dorsal ones are widely spaced. The dorsal surface is covered with short, moss-like pinnae in the area surrounding the micropylar plate, whereas the area immediately around each pit is bare. The micropylar plate is 3 millimetres (0.12 in) long, occupying approximately five-sevenths of the dorsal surface's total length. It is slender in shape, that is, narrow. Its widest point is located at the micropylar cup (micropyle), which lies in the posterior third. The lid (operculum) of the egg is slightly oval. Its surface is rounded and convex. Its height is slightly less than half its width. The operculum features scattered pinnae that are somewhat smaller than those found on other parts of the egg. There are two medium-sized depressions on the operculum, one on each side of the lateral plane. The base color of the egg is dark brown, while the pinnae are light brown, standing out clearly against the surface.

== Distribution ==
The species originates from Vietnam. It has been recorded in the southern provinces of Lâm Đồng and Đắk Lắk; specifically, in Lâm Đồng Province, it was found both in the area of the former provincial boundaries (now the central part of the province) and in the former province of Đắk Nông (in the northern part of the current province). It is thus distributed across large parts of the Tây Nguyên (Vietnamese for "Western Highlands").

Female holotype

Male from the breeding stock from Thac Krong Kmar

== Taxonomy ==
In 2021, Royce T. Cumming, Sarah Bank, Joachim Bresseel, Jérôme Constant, Stéphane Le Tirant, Zhiwei Dong, Gontran Sonet and Sven Bradler described Cryptophyllium limogesi alongside 12 other species within the newly established genus Cryptophyllium. This genus also incorporated 12 species previously classified under the genus Phyllium. The specific name honors René Limoges, a staff member at the Montreal Insectarium who supported the "Team Phyllies" for many years with countless photographs worthy of publication. In addition to the female holotype, two males, 13 females, and seven eggs were designated as paratypes. The holotype was collected in May 2018 in Dambri, Bảo Lâm District, Lâm Đồng province. A male nymph was discovered during a multi-year Global Taxonomy Initiative (GTI) project launched by the Museum of Natural Sciences in Brussels. The specimen collected by Constant and Bresseel in early August 2019 in Tà Đùng National Park, Đắk Nông province was transported to Belgium, where Tim Bollens successfully reared it. It was the first specimen of the species to undergo molecular genetic analysis, following the extraction of its vomer. The specimen was deposited as a paratype at the Museum of Natural Sciences in Brussels. All remaining paratypes were collected in Đắk Lắk province by local collectors in September 2020. The female holotype, the second male paratype, three female paratypes, and three of the eggs are housed at the Montreal Insectarium. Of the remaining ten female paratypes, five are held in Cumming’s private reference collection and five in Le Tirant’s. Regarding the remaining four eggs designated as paratypes, two are deposited in Cumming’s collection, one in Le Tirant’s collection, and one in that of Frank H. Hennemann.

Molecular genetic analysis of the male specimen collected in 2019 revealed that Cryptophyllium limogesi is the sister species to the smaller and morphologically very distinct Cryptophyllium icarus. Both species occur sympatrically and either syntopically or at least allotopically, a fact that may account for the differences in morphology and size. This finding was confirmed by a subsequent analysis that also included the female holotype of Cryptophyllium limogesi. Both species form a clade together with Cryptophyllium bankoi, a species native to a region slightly further north in Vietnam. Molecular genetic comparisons were conducted first on a paratype and later on the holotype of this species as well (see also cladogram of genus Cryptophyllium).

== Terraristics ==
After successfully rearing the male paratype of this species, collected as a nymph in Ta Dung National Park in 2019, Tim Bollens received eggs in late November 2020. These originated from specimens found near the Krông Kmar Waterfall (Vietnamese: Thác Krông Kmar) in August 2020, which had begun laying eggs in September. The first nymph hatched in Bollens' care on February 19, 2021. This specimens and others that hatched from the eggs were also successfully reared. Molecular genetic analysis confirmed that these specimens were unequivocally Cryptophyllium limogesi. The eggs were distributed with their place of origin noted and the resulting specimens have since been maintained in culture as Cryptophyllium limogesi 'Thac Krong Kmar'. When kept in well-ventilated enclosures, such as mesh cages ("flexariums") their care and breeding are considered straightforward, much like those of the smaller, related species Cryptophyllium icarus. As with most leaf insects, raspberry and bramble leaves serves as suitable feed.

== Gallery ==
Male paratype from Tà Đùng National Park in the IRSNB

Vomer of the male paratype from the IRSNB: 1 ventral, 2 right lateral, and 3 left lateral views of the ventrally oriented vomer

The later male paratype from Tà Đùng National Park

Newly hatched L1 nymph from the breeding stock from Thac Krong Kmar
