= Thái Sơn (disambiguation) =

Thái Sơn may refer to several rural communes in Vietnam, including:

- Thái Sơn, a commune of Tuyên Quang province
- Thái Sơn, Haiphong, a former commune of An Lão district, Haiphong
- Thái Sơn, Cao Bằng, a former commune of Bảo Lâm district, Cao Bằng
- Thái Sơn, Nghệ An, a former commune of Đô Lương district
- Thái Sơn, Bắc Giang, a former commune of Hiệp Hòa district
- Thái Sơn, Thái Bình, a former commune of Thái Thụy district
