= Hòa Sơn (disambiguation) =

Hòa Sơn may refer to several rural communes in Vietnam, including:

- Hòa Sơn, a commune of Đắk Lắk province
- Hòa Sơn, Đà Nẵng, a former commune of Hòa Vang district
- Hòa Sơn, Bắc Giang, a commune of Hiệp Hòa district
- Hòa Sơn, Hòa Bình, a former commune of Lương Sơn district
- Hòa Sơn, Lạng Sơn, a former commune of Hữu Lũng district
- Hòa Sơn, Nghệ An, a former commune of Đô Lương district
- Hòa Sơn, Ninh Thuận, a former commune of Ninh Sơn district
