= Hợp Thịnh (disambiguation) =

Hợp Thịnh may refer to several rural communes in Vietnam, including:

- Hợp Thịnh, Bắc Giang, a commune of Hiệp Hòa District
- Hợp Thịnh, Hòa Bình, a commune of Kỳ Sơn District, Hòa Bình
- Hợp Thịnh, Vĩnh Phúc, a commune of Tam Dương District
