= Hoa Thanh =

Hoa Thanh may refer to several places in Vietnam, including:

== Hòa Thành ==
- Hòa Thành (town), a former district-level town of Tây Ninh Province
- Hòa Thành, Cà Mau, a ward of Cà Mau province
- Hòa Thành, Phú Yên, a former rural commune of Đông Hòa District
- Hòa Thành, Đắk Lắk, a former rural commune of Krông Bông District
- Hòa Thành, Đồng Tháp, a former rural commune of Lai Vung District
- Former Hòa Thành township, the district capital of Hòa Thành District, dissolved in 2020 to form the ward of Long Hoa.

== Hòa Thạnh ==
- Hòa Thạnh, Tân Phú, a former ward of Tân Phú District, Ho Chi Minh City
- Hòa Thạnh, Tây Ninh, a former rural commune of Châu Thành District, Tây Ninh Province
- Hòa Thạnh, Vĩnh Long, a former rural commune of Tam Bình District

== Hóa Thanh ==
- Hóa Thanh, a former rural commune of Minh Hóa District
