= Hiệp Hòa (disambiguation) =

Hiệp Hòa can refer to:

- Emperor Hiệp Hòa, the sixth emperor of the Vietnamese Nguyễn Dynasty.
- Hiệp Hòa District in Bac Giang Province.
- Hiệp Hòa, a township in Duc Hoa District, Long An province.
- Hiệp Hòa, Bắc Ninh, a township in Hiệp Hòa district, Bac Ninh province.
- Hiệp Hòa, Long An, a commune in Duc Hoa District, Long An province.
- Hiệp Hòa, Biên Hòa, a ward in Bien Hoa, Dong Nai province.
- Hiệp Hòa, Hải Phòng, a commune in Vinh Bao District, Hai Phong.
- Hiệp Hòa, Thái Bình, a commune in Vu Thu District, Thai Binh province.
- Hiệp Hòa, Quảng Nam, a commune in Hiep Duc District, Quang Nam province.
- Hiệp Hòa, Trà Vinh, a commune in Cau Ngang District, Tra Vinh province.
- Hiệp Hòa, Quảng Ninh, a commune in Quang Yen, Quang Ninh province.
- Hiệp Hòa, Hải Dương, a commune in Kinh Mon, Hai Duong province.
