= Đông Lỗ =

Đông Lỗ may refer to several places in Vietnam, including:

- Đông Lỗ, Hanoi, a rural commune of Ứng Hòa District.
- Đông Lỗ, Bắc Giang, a rural commune of Hiệp Hòa District.
