= Đức Thắng =

Đức Thắng may refer to several places in Vietnam, including:

- Đức Thắng, Hanoi, a ward of Bắc Từ Liêm District
- Đức Thắng, Bình Thuận, a ward of Phan Thiết
- Đức Thắng, Bắc Giang, a commune of Hiệp Hòa District
- Đức Thắng, Quảng Ngãi, a commune of Mộ Đức District
- Đức Thắng, Hưng Yên, a commune of Tiên Lữ District
