= Mai Đình =

Mai Đình may refer to several places in Vietnam, including:

- Mai Đình, Hanoi, a rural commune of Sóc Sơn District
- Mai Đình, Bắc Giang, a rural commune of Hiệp Hòa District
