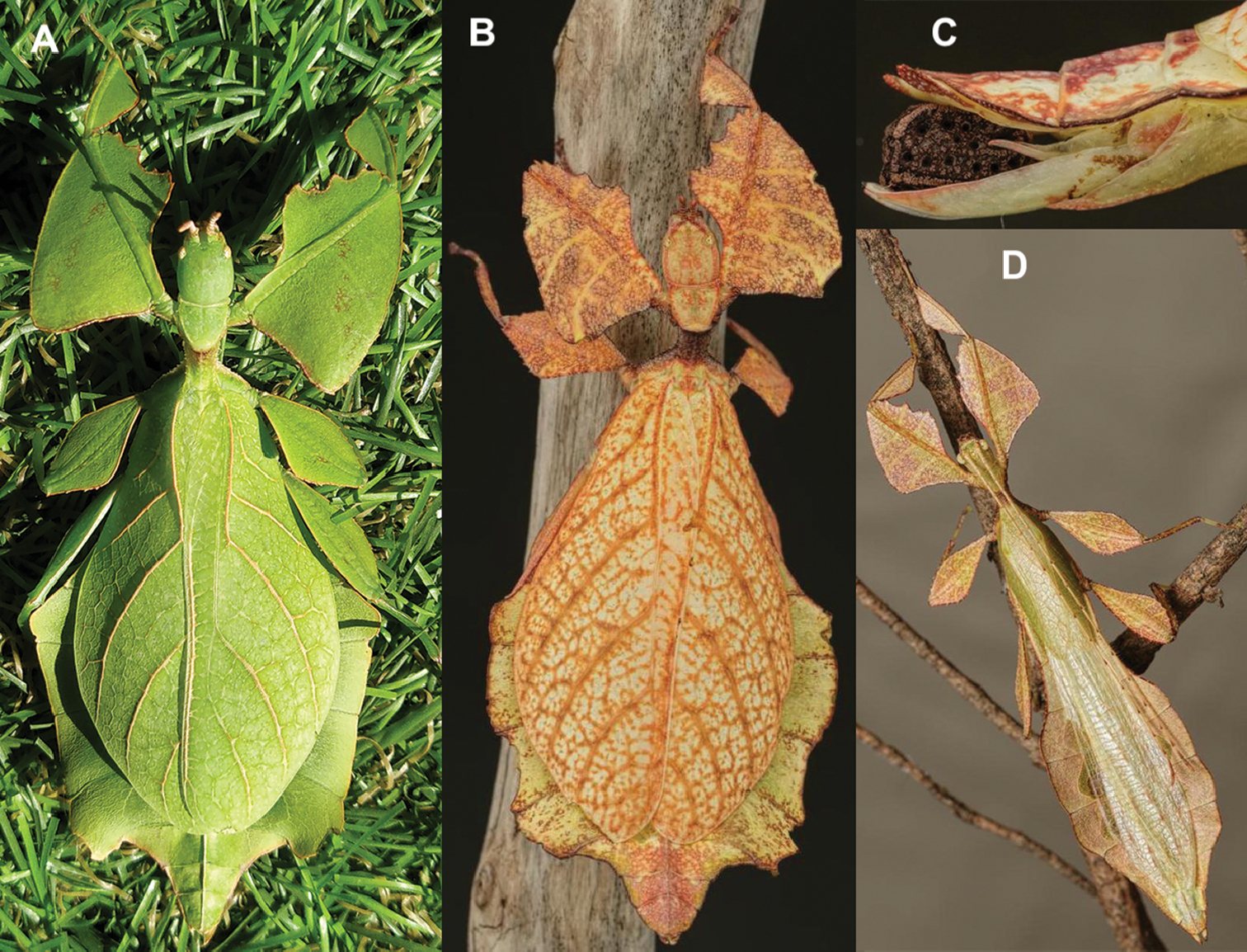
- Cryptophyllium celebicum, A and B females, C end of a female abdomen with egg, D male

Scientific classification
- Kingdom: Animalia
- Phylum: Arthropoda
- Clade: Pancrustacea
- Class: Insecta
- Order: Phasmatodea
- Suborder: Euphasmatodea
- Superfamily: Phyllioidea
- Family: Phylliidae
- Tribe: Phylliini
- Genus: Cryptophyllium; Cumming, Bank, Bresseel, Constant, Le Tirant, Dong, Sonet & Bradler, 2021

Type species
- Cryptophyllium celebicum (de Haan, 1842)

Species
- List: Cryptophyllium animatum; Cryptophyllium athanysus; Cryptophyllium bankoi; Cryptophyllium bollensi; Cryptophyllium celebicum; Cryptophyllium chrisangi; Cryptophyllium daparo; Cryptophyllium drunganum; Cryptophyllium echidna; Cryptophyllium faulkneri; Cryptophyllium icarus; Cryptophyllium khmer; Cryptophyllium limogesi; Cryptophyllium liyananae; Cryptophyllium nuichuaense; Cryptophyllium oyae; Cryptophyllium parum; Cryptophyllium phami; Cryptophyllium rarum; Cryptophyllium tibetense; Cryptophyllium wennae; Cryptophyllium westwoodii; Cryptophyllium yapicum; Cryptophyllium yunnanense

= Cryptophyllium =

Genus of insects

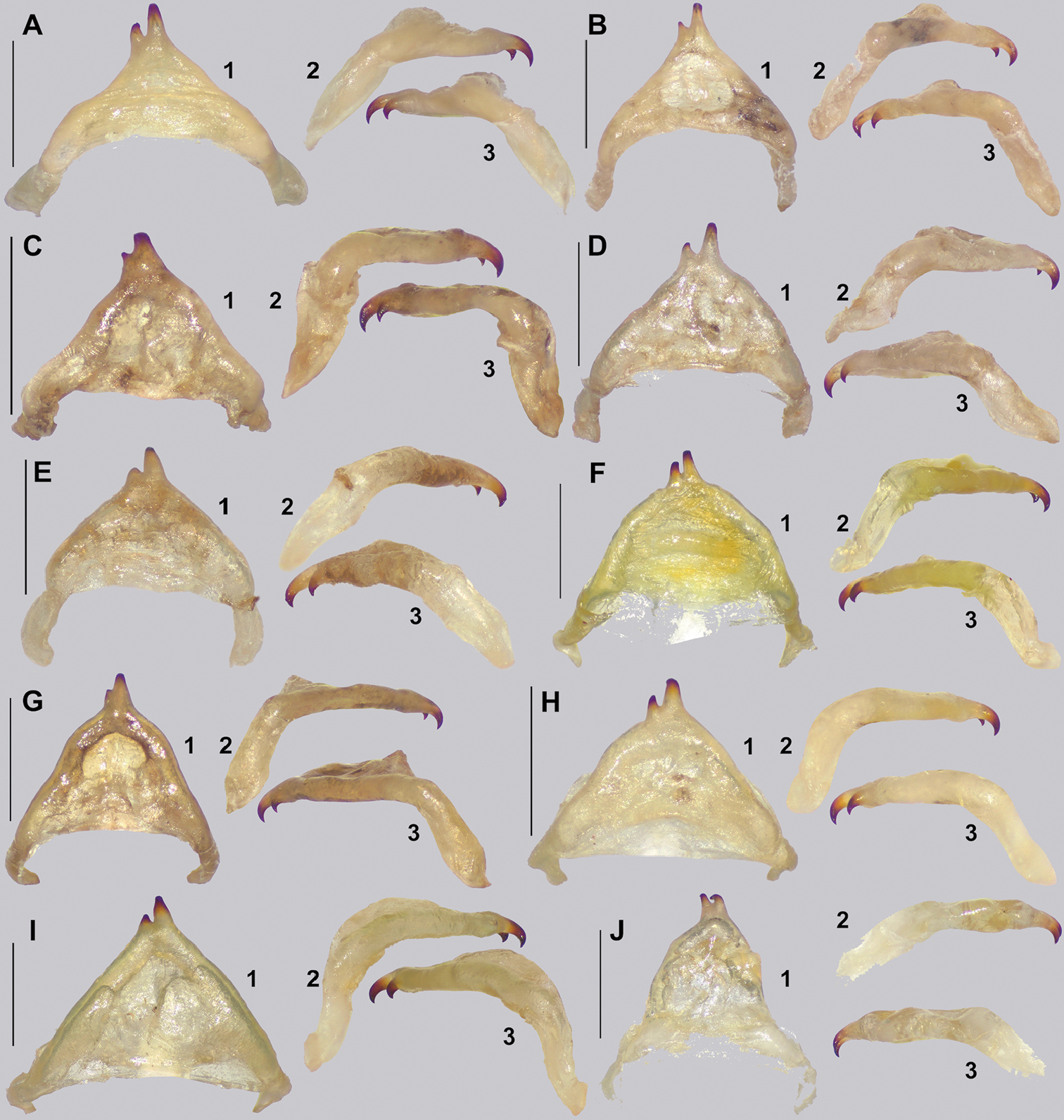
Vomers of males of eight Cryptophyllium species

Cryptophyllium is a genus of stick insects belonging to the Phylliidae (leaf insects) described in 2021, comprising medium-sized to large species. All species of this genus described before 2021 were originally described in the genus Phyllium. Cryptophyllium species are native from Sri Lanka through Nepal, eastern India, eastern China, and large parts of Southeast Asia to Micronesia.

== Description ==
The only characteristic unique to the genus Cryptophyllium is the vomer of the males, which has always two apical hooks. This movable sclerite on the tenth sternums of the male abdomen, which serves to anchor the male to the seventh sternum of the female's abdomen during mating, has only one hook in all other Phylliidae. This difference was already pointed out in 2011 by Detlef Größer, who examined a total of 22 vomers from representatives now assigned to 12 genera. Only the vomers of the two specimens designated as Phyllium celebicum from Thailand (now Cryptophyllium westwoodii) exhibited two hooks at the tip of the vomer. All other characteristics, considered individually, also occur in other genera of the Phyllidae, but do not represent autapomorphic traits of the genus. Both sexes always possess inner lobes (protibial interior lobes) on the tibiae of the forelegs. Some species have either fully developed outer lobes on the tibiae of the mid and hind legs (mesotibial and metatibial exterior lobes), others have only small lobes reduced to the distal end on the outer tibiae of the fore, mid, and hind legs, or the mid and hind legs have no outer lobes at all. The outer lobes of the femurs of the forelegs (profemular exterior lobes) can be rounded and blunt, angular with rounded corners, distinctly right-angled, or even acute-angled with posteriorly curved outer angles in both sexes. The inner lobes of the forelegs' femurs (profemural interior lobes) can have teeth of uniform size and spacing, or bi-serrated and triangular teeth in various arrangements. Most commonly, there are five teeth in a 2-1-2 arrangement. The thorax of both sexes is variable. The pleura of the mesothorax (mesopleura) can be narrow anteriorly, fanning out only from about halfway along its length, or, at the other extreme, broad and spreading evenly along its entire length. Some species exhibit an intermediate form. The abdominal shape is variable in both sexes and can be box-shaped, spatulate, oval, narrow and long, or sharply tapered.

=== Females ===
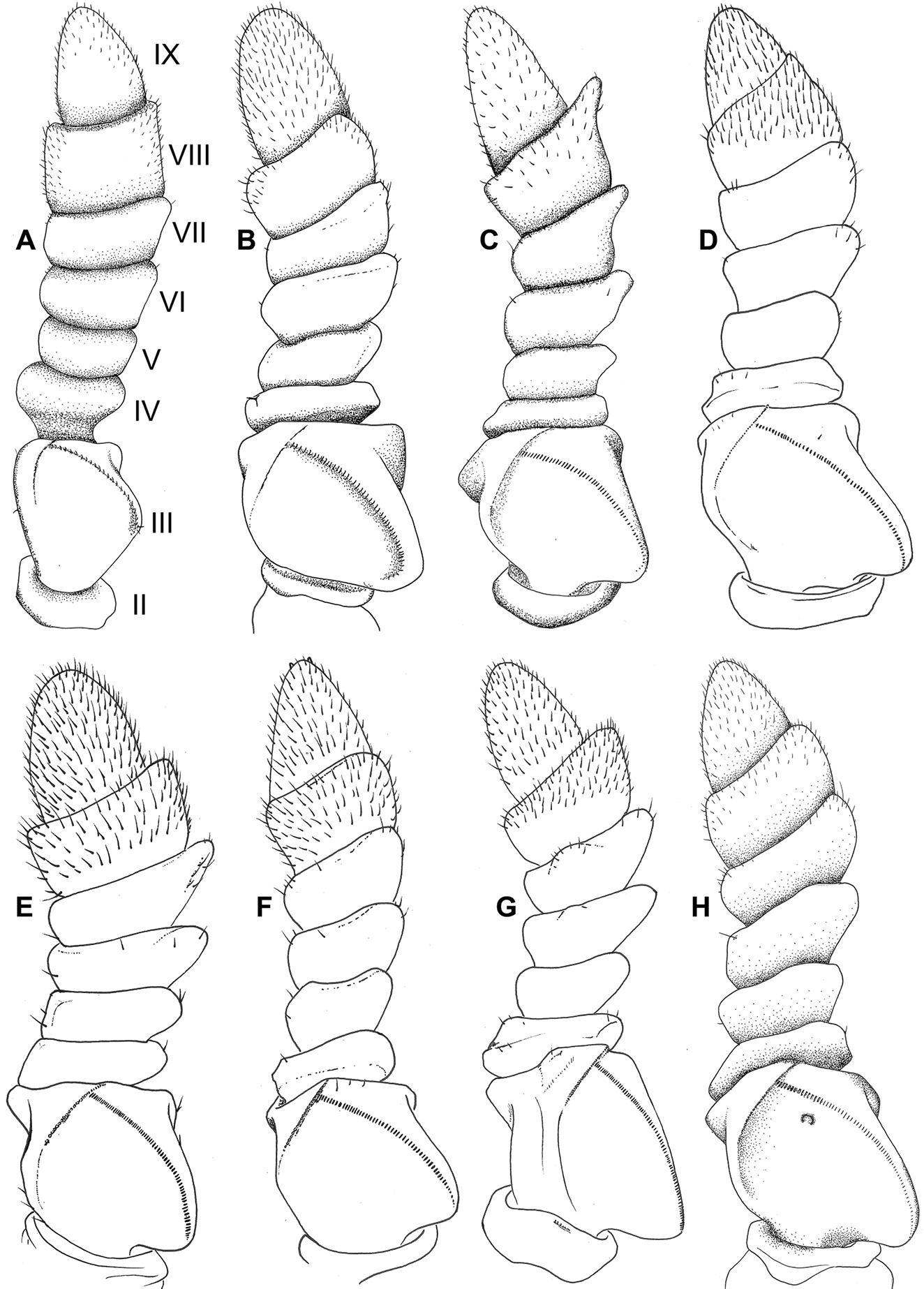
B-H Antennae of seven female Cryptophyllium species compared with those of A Phyllium (here Phyllium ericorai)

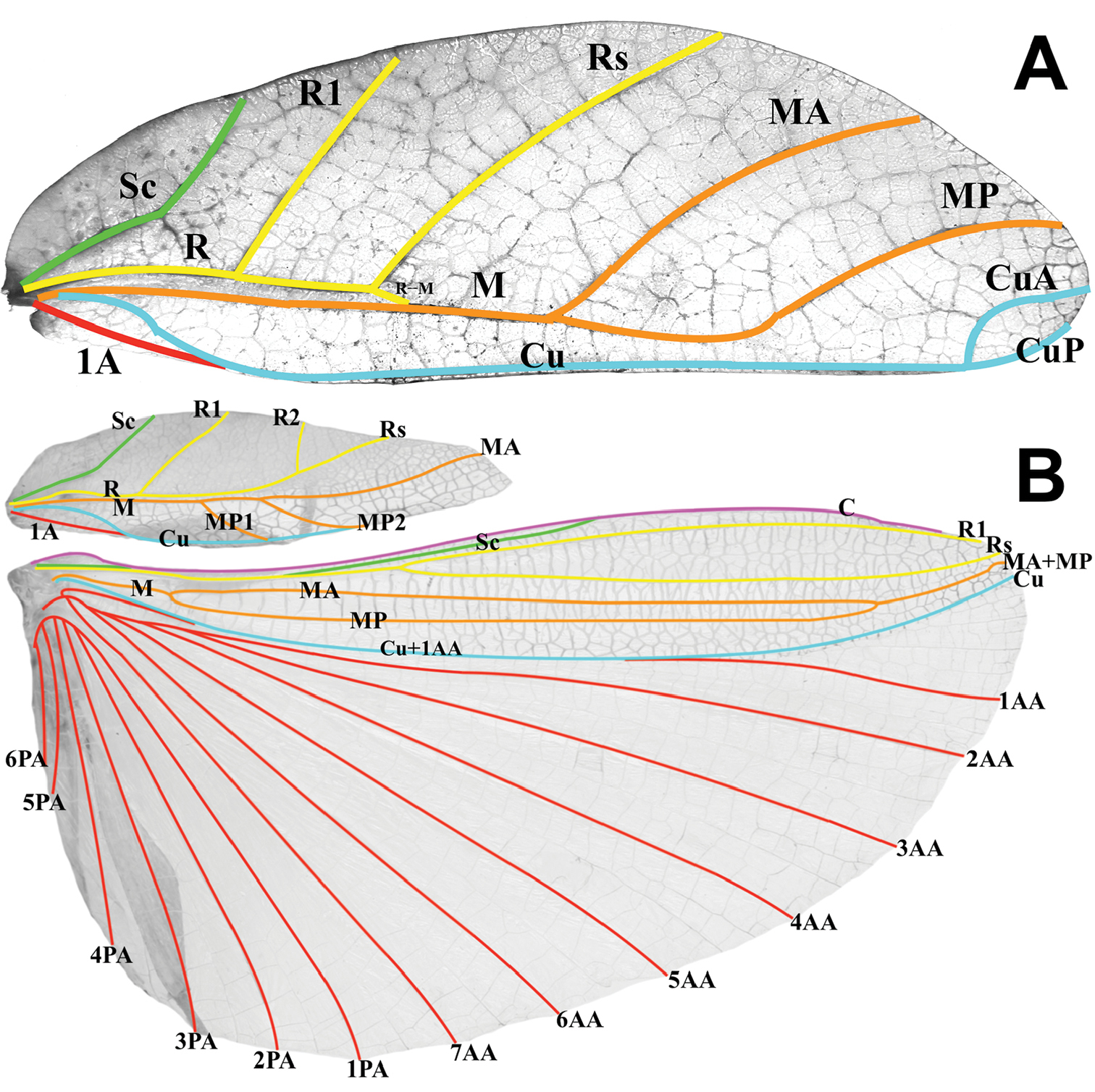
Venation of A forewing of a female of Cryptophyllium celebicum and B fore- and hindwing of a male of Cryptophyllium yunnanense

Alongside smaller species, such as Cryptophyllium athanysus, whose females reach a length of only 77 millimetres (3.0 in), there are many species whose females rank among the largest of all leaf insects. Depending on the source, these include species ranging from 105 to 120 millimetres (4.1 to 4.7 in) in length, making them comparable in size to Pulchriphyllium giganteum. This group includes Cryptophyllium daparo, Cryptophyllium limogesi, Cryptophyllium tibetense, and Cryptophyllium faulkneri. The antennae of the females consist of nine segments. Unlike in Phyllium species, their fourth segment is short and disc-shaped, and at least three times wider than it are long. It is shorter than any of the following three segments. In Phyllium, the fourth antennal segment is as long as it is wide and of a similar length to each of the three following segments. The forewings, which are tegmina in all leaf insects, are always long in female Cryptophyllium. Typical venation includes a subcoasta vein (Sc), a radius vein (R) that divides into the first radial vein (R1) and the radial sector vein (Rs) and terminates in a small radial-medial cross vein (R-M), a bifurcated median vein (M), a bifurcated cubitus vein (Cu), and a first anal vein (1A) that fuses with the cubitus early on. The hindwings (alae) of females are usually well-developed and half as long to almost as long as the tegmina. Rarely, as in Cryptophyllium icarus, they are so reduced that they do not reach abdominal segment two. The presence of hindwings is thus exactly the opposite of that of female in Phyllium species, in which partially or fully developed hindwings occur only exceptionally, as in Phyllium ericoriai. The subgenital plate of female Cryptophyllium species can be short and robust or very long and thin, always extending to the tip of the abdomen.

=== Males ===
Male body lengths ranging from 55 millimetres (2.2 in) in Cryptophyllium bollensi to 89 millimetres (3.5 in) in Cryptophyllium animatum have been documented. The male antennae consist of 24 to 29 segments. As in Pulchriphyllium, they are held posteriorly against the abdomen when at rest, whereas male Phyllium typically hold their antennae anteriorly. The length of the male tegmina varies slightly. Most species possess tegmina that extend to the third abdominal segment, or less frequently to the fourth. The venation of the male tegmina includes two median posterior veins (MP1 and MP2) and one anterior vein (MA). The cubitus (Cu) is unbranched. The alae of the males are always long and fully developed. They possess a costa (C) and subcosta (Sc) at the anterior margin. Behind these lies the radius vein (R), which divides into a first radius (R1) and a radial sector (Rs), which rejoin at the wing margin. Behind this runs the median vein (M), which divides into an anterior (media anterior = MA) and a posterior (media posterior = MP) portion, but then rejoins and merges to the wing margin. The cubitus vein (Cu) typically runs fused with the first anterior anal vein (1AA) before both divide anterior to the wing margin. In total, there are seven anterior anal veins and five to seven posterior anal veins. The two hooks at the tip of the vomer, typical of the genus, are usually shaped differently. One hook is typically larger and more prominent, while the other is smaller. Less frequently, both hooks are the same size and shape.

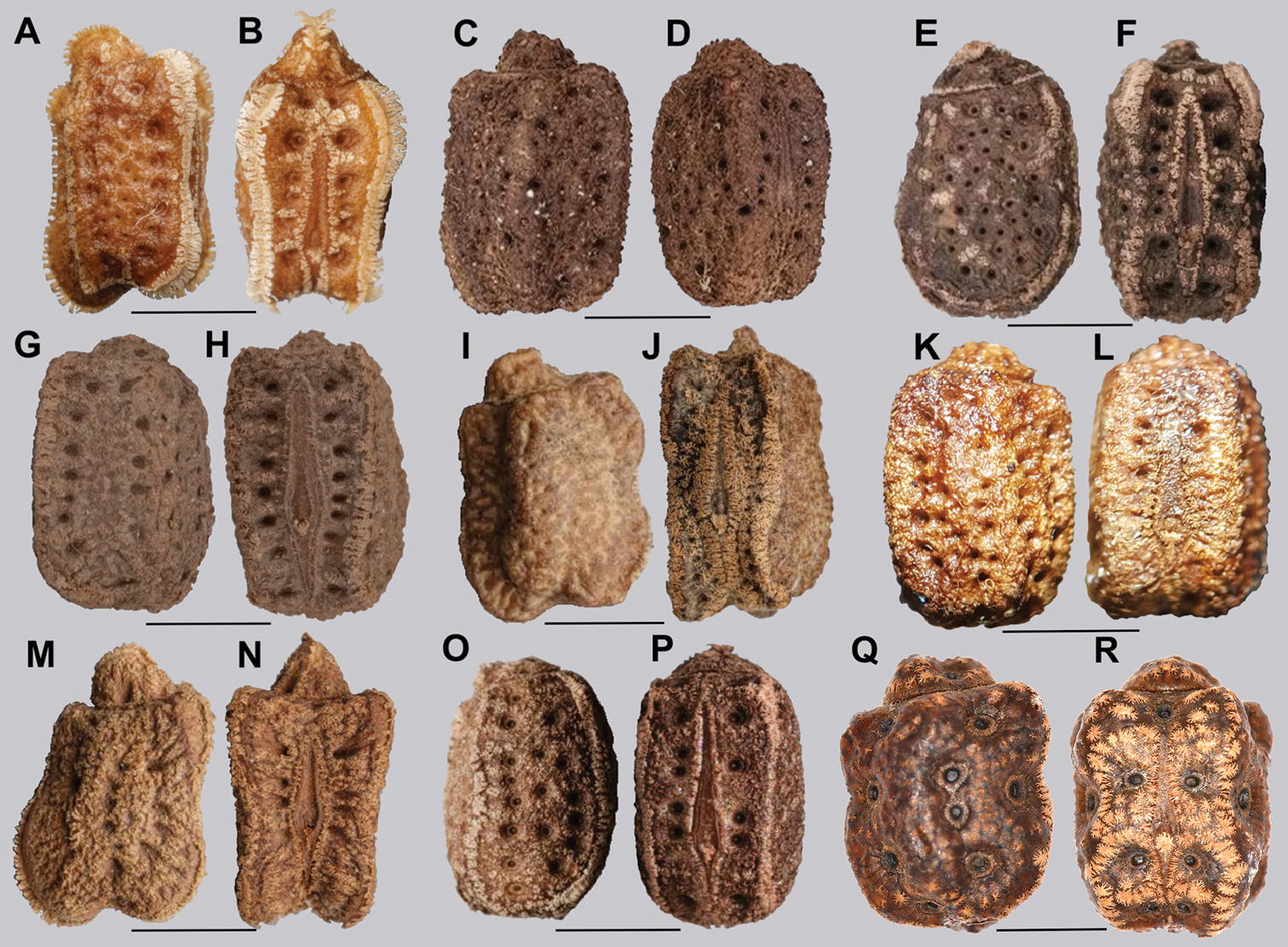
Eggs of nine Cryptophyllium species

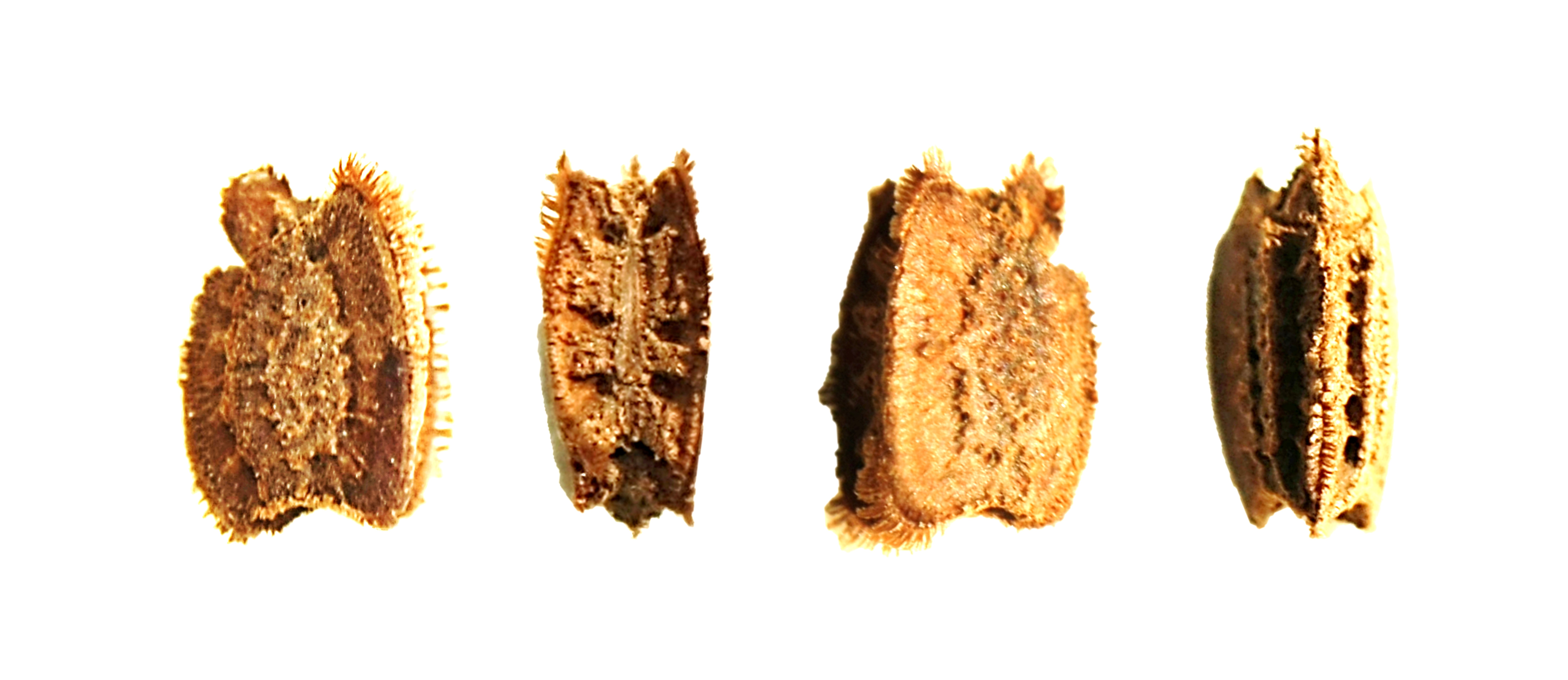
Eggs of Cryptophyllium faulkneri

=== Eggs ===
The morphology of the eggs varies in color, size, and the arrangement of pits, although the general characteristics are relatively uniform. All known eggs are relatively small and lack pronounced lateral fins. They appear box-shaped with relatively straight edges and short, moss-like pinnae on most surfaces. The lid (operculum) is conically raised and has a similar surface texture to the rest of the egg. The short, moss-like pinnae found here are typically somewhat longer at the edges of the operculum. The micropylar plate on the dorsal side of the egg is usually in the form of a narrow slit, widest at the level of the micropyle. On either side of the micropylar plate is a row of more or less distinct pits, the number of which can vary between two (e.g., in Cryptophyllium limogesi) and about ten (e.g., in Cryptophyllium oyae) per side, depending on the species. In addition to this box-like egg morphology, other forms also occur. For instance, the eggs of Cryptophyllium faulkneri are strongly laterally compressed; in cross-section, they do not form a square but rather an isosceles triangle. The dorsal side, featuring the slit-like micropylar plate, forms the base of the triangle.

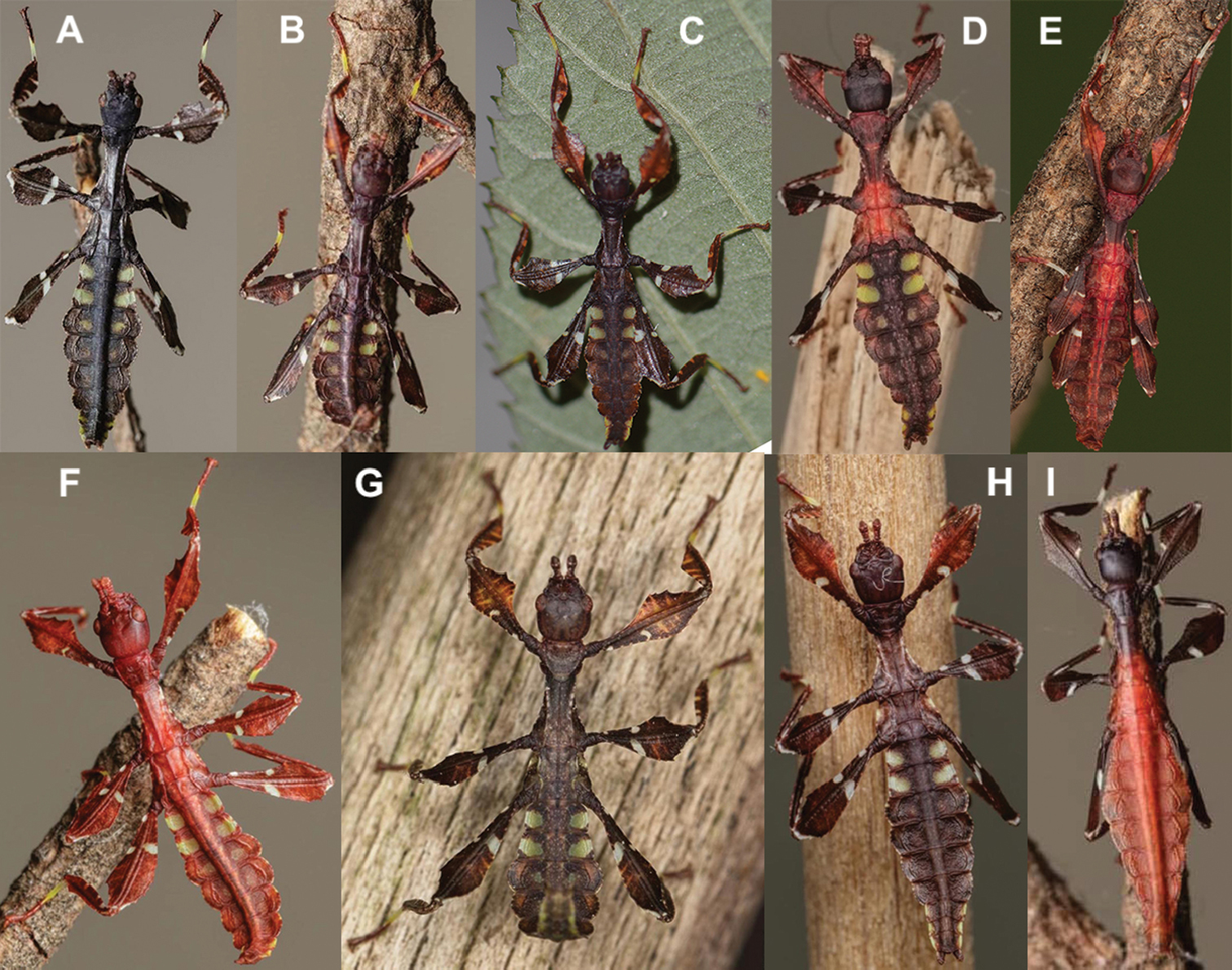
Freshly hatched nymphs of ten Cryptophyllium species

=== Freshly hatched nymphs ===
Newly hatched nymphs have a brown to red base color. Many species have distinct green spots on abdominal segments two and three, which contrast with the rest of the nymphal coloration. All newly hatched nymphs have partial white bands on the lobes of the femurs of their middle and hind legs. In some species, these white bands are also weakly to fully developed on the lobes of the forelegs. The bright red nymphs of species such as Cryptophillium icarus closely resemble the nymphs of the orchid mantis (Hymenopus coronatus) and those of the genus Paradasynus, which belongs to the true bug tribe Dasynini and has a two-toned warning coloration. It is thought that newly hatched nymphs of Hymenopus coronatus and Cryptophillium icarus benefit from this aposematic mimicry, which is common among true bugs of the infraorder Pentatomomorpha and serves as a warning of their unpalatability.

== Distribution ==
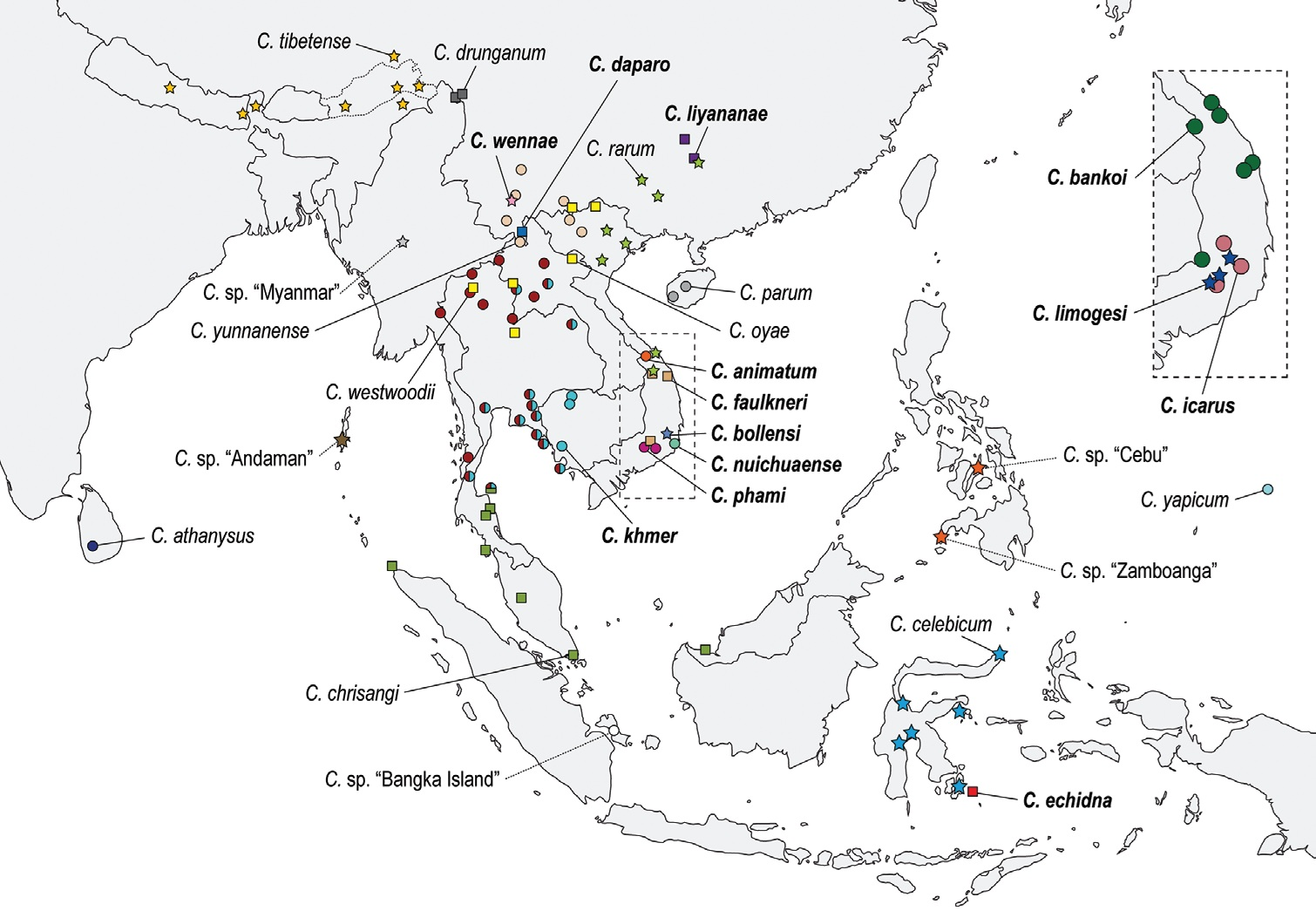
Distribution of Cryptophyllium species according to Cumming et al. (2021)

The distribution area of the genus Cryptophyllium extends eastward to Sri Lanka. In the north, it ranges from Nepal through the Indian states of West Bengal and Assam, the Chinese Tibet Autonomous Region, to the province of Yunnan. In the east, the distribution area extends from the Chinese autonomous region of Guangxi through Hainan Province to the distant Micronesian island of Yap. The southern limit of the genus's distribution includes Sumatra, Bangka Island, Sulawesi, and Peleng, reaching its southernmost point at Buton Island and Wangi-wangi Island, located southeast of Sulawesi. Within this area, most representatives, namely eleven species, occur in Vietnam. A further nine species have been recorded in China. Species have also been recorded in Myanmar, Thailand, Laos, Cambodia, and Singapore, as well as from Malay Peninsula and Borneo. Due to Bhutan's location amidst Nepal, Tibet, and Assam, Cryptophyllium is also assumed to occur there. Unidentified or undescribed species of the genus have also been observed in the Andaman Islands and on the Philippine islands of Cebu and Mindanao, specifically on the Zamboanga Peninsula.

== Taxonomy ==
- Cryptophyllium
  - - - Cryptophyllium bollensi
      - - Cryptophyllium nuichuaense
        - Cryptophyllium phami
    - - Cryptophyllium faulkneri
      - - - Cryptophyllium celebicum
          - Cryptophyllium echidna
        - - Cryptophyllium khmer
          - - Cryptophyllium chrisangi
            - Cryptophyllium westwoodii
  - - - Cryptophyllium bankoi
      - - Cryptophyllium icarus
        - Cryptophyllium limogesi
    - - - Cryptophyllium daparo
        - - Cryptophyllium tibetense
          - Cryptophyllium cf. drunganum
      - - - Cryptophyllium animatum
          - Cryptophyllium rarum
        - - Cryptophyllium wennae
          - - Cryptophyllium liyananae
            - - - Cryptophyllium parum
                - Cryptophyllium oyae
              - Cryptophyllium yunnanense

Relationships of the Cryptophyllium species examined so far by genetic analysis according to Bank et al. (2021) and Cumming et al. (2023)

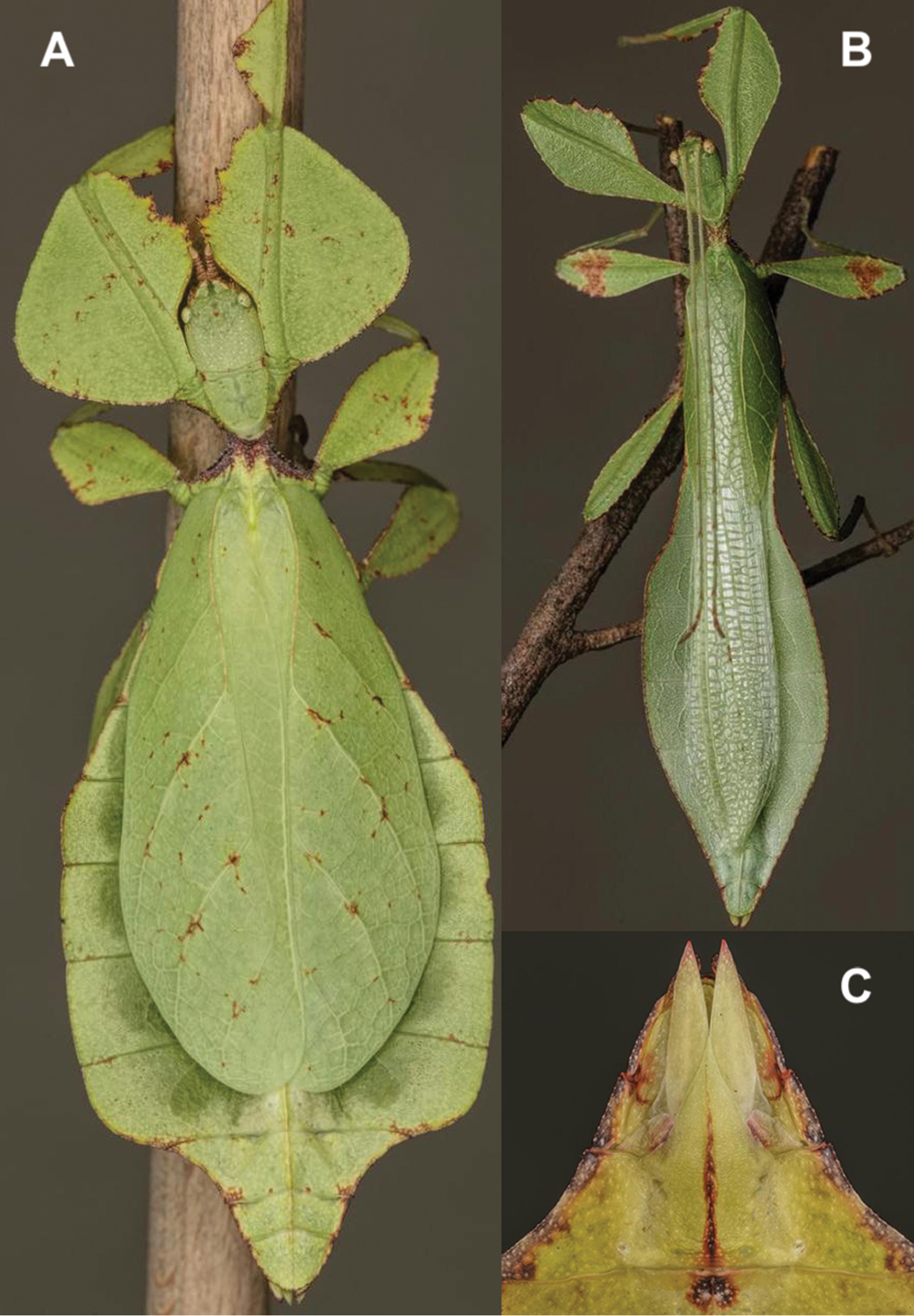
Cryptophyllium bollensi, A female, B male, C end of a female abdomen from ventral

Frank H. Hennemann et al. proposed in 2009 the division of the genus Phyllium and its then subgenera into species groups. In the Celebicum species group they placed Phyllium (Phyllium) celebicum (now Cryptophyllium celebicum), described in 1842 by Wilhem de Haan, as well as Phyllium (Phyllium) athanysus (now Cryptophyllium athanysus), Phyllium (Phyllium) parum (now Cryptophyllium parum), Phyllium (Phyllium) rarum (now Cryptophyllium rarum), Phyllium (Phyllium) tibetense (now Cryptophyllium tibetense), Phyllium (Phyllium) westwoodii (now Cryptophyllium westwoodii), Phyllium (Phyllium) yunnanense (now Cryptophyllium yunnanense), and the newly described Phyllium (Phyllium) ericoriai. The main characteristic of this group is the presence of hindwings in the females of these species. With the exception of Phyllium ericoriai, the seven other species, along with three additional species described between 2009 and 2021, were transferred in 2021 to the genus Cryptophyllium, established by Royce T. Cumming, Sarah Bank, Joachim Bresseel, Jérôme Constant, Stéphane Le Tirant, Zhiwei Dong, Gontran Sonet, and Sven Bradler. Phyllium drunganum, previously classified by Hennemann et al. in the Siccifolium species group, was also transferred as Cryptophyllium drunganum to this genus. The fact that the only known specimen of tis species at the time, the female holotype, also possessed long hindwings was not known then. Cumming et al. described 13 further species concurrently with the establishment of the genus Cryptophyllium. The earliest described species, Cryptophyllium celebicum, was designated as the type species.

The name "Cryptophyllium" means "hidden leaf" or "secret leaf" and is composed of the Latinized name Phyllium, the type genus of the family (from the Greek φυλλον, -ου (phyllon, -oy)), and the prefix "Crypto", Latinized from the Ancient Greek word κρύπτο (krypto) for "hidden", "concealed", or "secret". The name was chosen because the genus was “hidden” within Phyllium, but also because its representatives are masters of camouflage and are well hidden in their habitat in the canopy of leaves. Like Phyllium, Cryptoiphyllium is also neuter.

The genus Cryptophyllium currently comprises the following 24 species:

- Cryptophyllium animatum Cumming, Bank, Bresseel, Constant, Le Tirant, Dong, Sonet & Bradler, 2021 - Vietnam
- Cryptophyllium athanysus (Westwood, 1859) - Sri Lanka
- Cryptophyllium bankoi Cumming et al., 2021 - Vietnam
- Cryptophyllium bollensi Cumming et al., 2021 - Vietnam
- Cryptophyllium celebicum (de Haan, 1842) – type species (as Phyllium celebicum de Haan, 1842) - Sulawesi
- Cryptophyllium chrisangi (Seow-Choen, 2017) - Thailand, Malay Peninsula, Singapore, Sumatra & Borneo
- Cryptophyllium daparo Cumming et al., 2021 - China (Yunnan)
- Cryptophyllium drunganum (Yang, 1995) - China (Yunnan)
- Cryptophyllium echidna Cumming et al., 2021 - Sulawesi
- Cryptophyllium faulkneri Cumming et al., 2021 - Vietnam
- Cryptophyllium icarus Cumming et al., 2021 - Vietnam
- Cryptophyllium khmer Cumming et al., 2021 - Cambodia
- Cryptophyllium limogesi Cumming et al., 2021 - Vietnam
- Cryptophyllium liyananae Cumming et al., 2021 - China (Guangxi)
- Cryptophyllium nuichuaense Cumming et al., 2021 - Vietnam
- Cryptophyllium oyae (Cumming & Le Tirant, 2020) - Thailand, Laos & China (Yunnan)
- Cryptophyllium parum (Liu, 1993) - China (Hainan & Guangdong)
- Cryptophyllium phami Cumming et al., 2021 - Vietnam
- Cryptophyllium rarum (Liu, 1993) - China (Guangxi)
- Cryptophyllium tibetense (Liu, 1993) - Nepal, China (Tibet) & India (West Bengal & Assam)
- Cryptophyllium wennae Cumming et al., 2021 - China (Yunnan)
- Cryptophyllium westwoodii (Wood-Mason, 1875) - Thailand, Laos & Myanmar
- Cryptophyllium yapicum (Cumming & Teemsma, 2018) - Mikronesia (Yap Island)
- Cryptophyllium yunnanense (Liu, 1993) - China (Yunnan)

Bank et al., in their 2021 publication on phylogeny and historical biogeography, examined samples of various leaf insects using molecular genetics. These included 19 species from the genus Cryptophyllium. Based on the results of these investigations, Cryptophyllium is the sister genus of a clade consisting of the genera Phyllium, Pulchriphyllium, Microphyllium, and Pseudomicrophyllium. A further classification of the genus, which excludes the genera Acentetaphyllium, Rakaphyllium, and Vaabonbonphyllium which have not yet been examined using molecular genetics, also showed that Microphyllium and Pseudomicrophyllium are the sister genera of Pulchriphyllium and that these form a common clade with Cryptophyllium. The next higher clade includes the genus Phyllium (see also Cladogram of the Phylliidae).

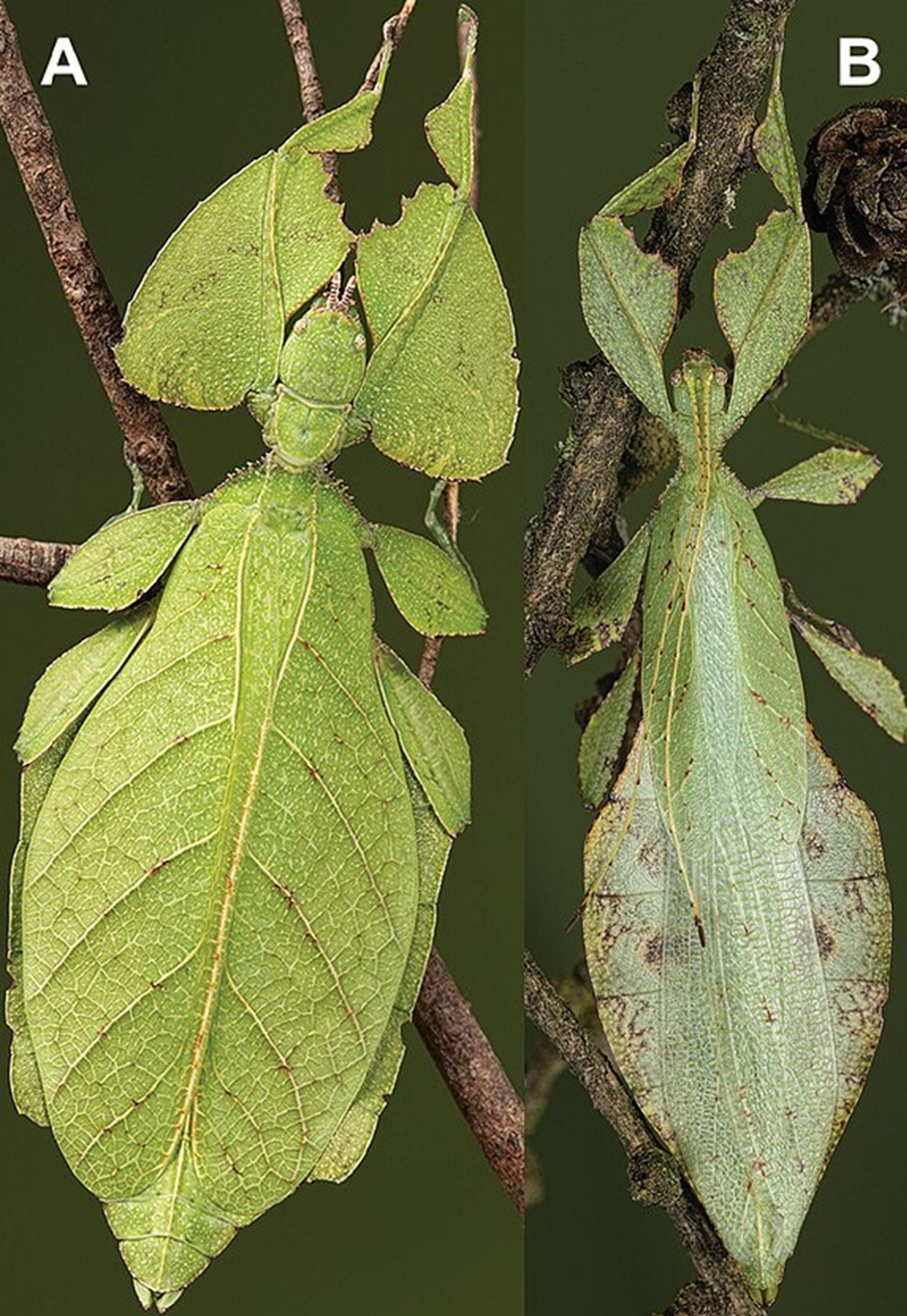
Cryptophyllium oyae, A female, B male

== Terraristics ==
Representatives of the present-day genus Cryptophyllium have been in captivity since the late 1990s. The Phasmid Study Group lists Cryptophyllium westwoodii under PSG number 128. Initially, the breeding stock imported from Thailand was called Phyllium celebicum before the species was identified as Phyllium westwoodii in 2009. Another breeding stock, now called Cryptophyllium westwoodii 'Tha Pla Duk', was first bred in Thailand by Suttah Ek-Amnuay in 2015 and subsequently bred and distributed in Europe by Bruno Kneubühler. The currently cultivated Cryptophyllium celebicum was also successfully bred by Hennemann as early as 2008. Since 2014, Kneubühler has distributed bred specimens of this species. The breeding line is referred to as either Cryptophyllium celebicum 'Bugadidi' or Cryptophyllium celebicum 'Sulawesi'.

The species Cryptophyllium bollensi has been in captivity since 2015. These specimens, originating from Phước Bình National Park in Vietnam, were initially bred by Tim Bollens, after whom the species was later named. Cryptophyllium icarus, also from Vietnam, specifically from Bidoup Nui Ba National Park, has been in captivity since 2014/2015. The same applies to Cryptophyllium oyae from Ban Saleuy in Laos, as well as the Vietnamese species Cryptophyllium faulkneri from Dong Giang, Cryptophyllium limogesi from Thac Krong Kmar, and Cryptophyllium phami from Cát Tiên National Park. The latter was first successfully bred by Kneubühler in 2013 and initially distributed as Phyllium sp. 'Cat Tien'. A breeding line of Cryptophyllium chrisangi is also currently being cultivated. The animals originating from Singapore were initially named Phyllium sp. 'Singapore'. A species originating from China, Cryptophyllium yunnanense (from Xishuangbanna), is also kept and bred. It has been in culture since at least 2021 and was initially distributed as Cryptophyllium sp. 'Xishuangbanna'. A breeding stock of Cryptophyllium tibetense originates from Medog in Tibet. However, the possibility of confusion with the similar Cryptophyllium wennae has been raised and discussed. At least one as-yet undescribed or unidentified species of the genus is being bred from northern Thailand under the names Cryptophyllium sp. 'Doi Saket' and Cryptophyllium sp. 'Chiang Rai'.

Accordingly, the following species or captive strains are or have been kept in culture:

- Cryptophyllium westwoodii (PSG No. 128)
  - Cryptophyllium westwoodii 'Thailand' (since the late 1990s)
  - Cryptophyllium westwoodii 'Tha Pla Duk' (since 2015)
- Cryptophyllium westwoodii 'Ratchaburi'
- Cryptophyllium celebicum 'Bugadidi' or 'Sulawesi' (since at least 2014)
- Cryptophyllium phami 'Cát Tiên' (since 2013)
- Cryptophyllium icarus 'Bidoup Nui Ba' (since 2014/2015)
- Cryptophyllium bollensi 'Phuoc Binh' (since 2015)
- Cryptophyllium oyae
  - Cryptophyllium oyae 'Ban Saleuy'
  - Cryptophyllium oyae 'Chiang Rai'
- Cryptophyllium faulkneri 'Dong Giang'
- Cryptophyllium limogesi 'Thac Krong Kmar'
- Cryptophyllium chrisangi 'Singapore'
- Cryptophyllium yunnanense 'Xishuangbanna' (since at least 2021)
- Cryptophyllium tibetense 'Mêdog'
- Cryptophyllium sp. 'Doi Saket'

Suitable forage plants include oak, hazel, bramble, Mangifera indica (mango), Psidium guajava (guava), and Gaultheria shallon (salal).
