= Bắc Lý =

Bắc Lý may refer to several places in Vietnam, including:

- Bắc Lý, Quảng Bình, a ward of Đồng Hới
- Bắc Lý, Bắc Giang, a commune of Hiệp Hòa District
- Bắc Lý, Nghệ An, a commune of Kỳ Sơn District, Nghệ An Province
- Bắc Lý, Ninh Bình, a commune of Lý Nhân District
