= Hương Lâm =

Hương Lâm may refer to several places in Vietnam, including:

- Hương Lâm, Bắc Giang, a rural commune of Hiệp Hòa District
- Hương Lâm, a commune of A Lưới District, Thừa Thiên-Huế Province
