= Vomer (disambiguation) =

Vomer is an unpaired facial bone of the skull.

Vomer may also refer to:

- Vomer (Phasmatodea), a sclerite of the tenth abdominal sternum of male stick insects
- Vomer, a synonym of the fish genus Selene
