= Chư Yang Sin National Park =

National park in Vietnam

- IUCN category II (national park)
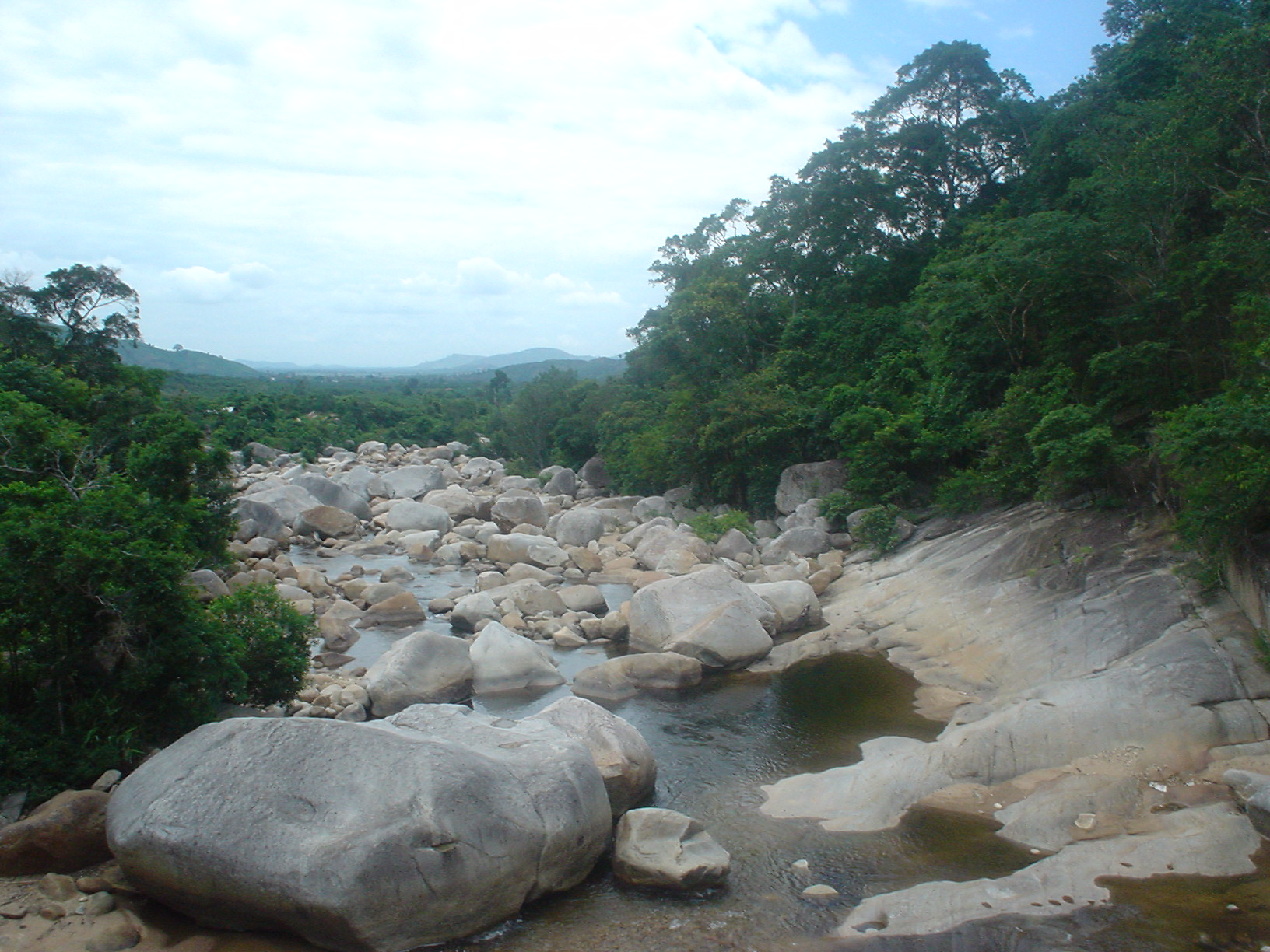
- Chư Yang Sin National Park

- Location within Vietnam
- Location: South Central Coast and Central Highlands, Vietnam
- Nearest city: Đồng Nai
- Coordinates: 12°52′37″N 108°26′17″E
- Area: 589.47 km^{2} (227.60 sq mi)
- Established: 2002
- Governing body: government of Đắk Lắk

Chư Yang Sin National Park (Vietnamese language: Vườn quốc gia Chư Yang Sin) is a national park in the communes of: Yang Mao, Cư Pui, Hoà Sơn, Krông Bông, Liên Sơn Lắk, Krông Nô, Đắk Phơi in the province of Đắk Lắk, South Central Coast and Central Highlands, Vietnam.

The national park was established according to the Decision number 92/2002/QĐ-TTg dated 12 July 2002, signed by then Prime Minister of Vietnam Nguyễn Tấn Dũng, this decision turned Chư Yang Sin Nature Reserve into Chư Yang Sin National Park.

The only confirmed reports of golden jackals (C.a. cruesemanni) in Vietnam come from Chư Yang Sin National Park.
