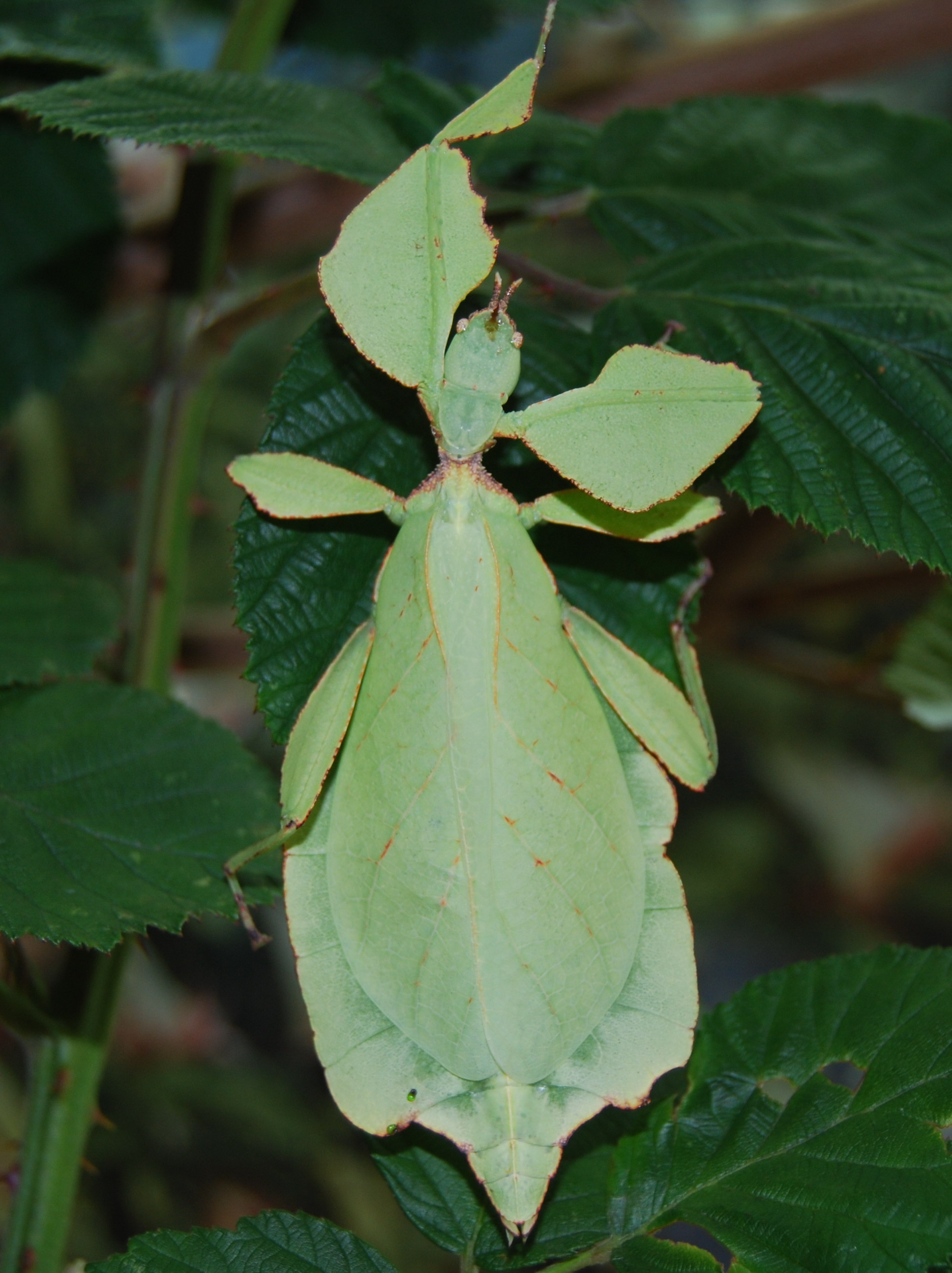
- Female
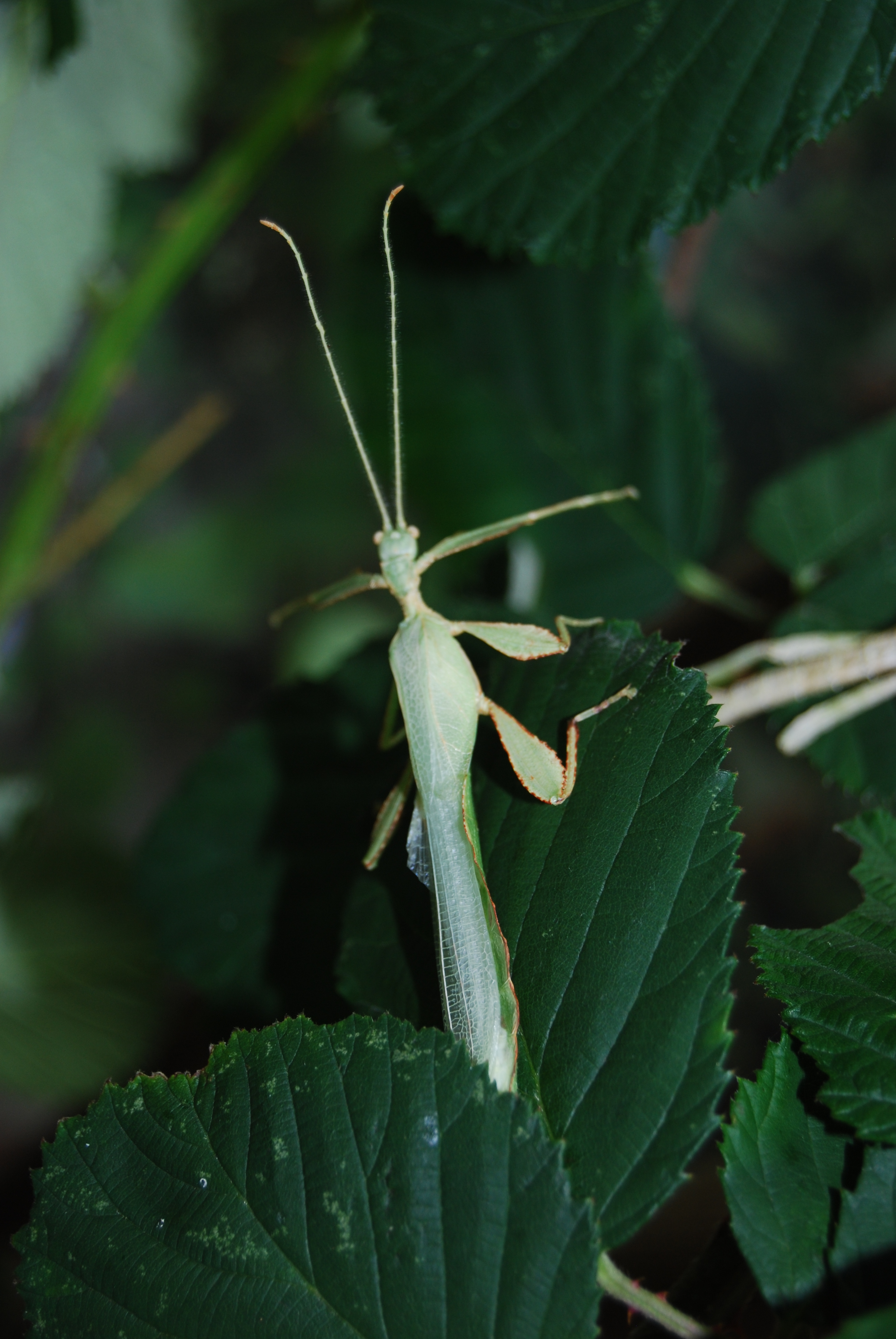
- Male

Scientific classification
- Domain: Eukaryota
- Kingdom: Animalia
- Phylum: Arthropoda
- Class: Insecta
- Order: Phasmatodea
- Family: Phylliidae
- Genus: Cryptophyllium
- Species: C. westwoodii

Binomial name
- Cryptophyllium westwoodii (Wood-Mason, 1875)

Synonyms
- Phyllium westwoodii Wood-Mason, 1875

= Cryptophyllium westwoodii =

Species of leaf insect

Cryptophyllium westwoodii is a species of leaf insect in the family Phylliidae. It is distributed from southern China, the Andaman islands, Myanmar, Indo-China, Sumatra and the Riouw Archipelago.
