= Long Hoa =

Long Hoa Phường Long Hoa
- Ward
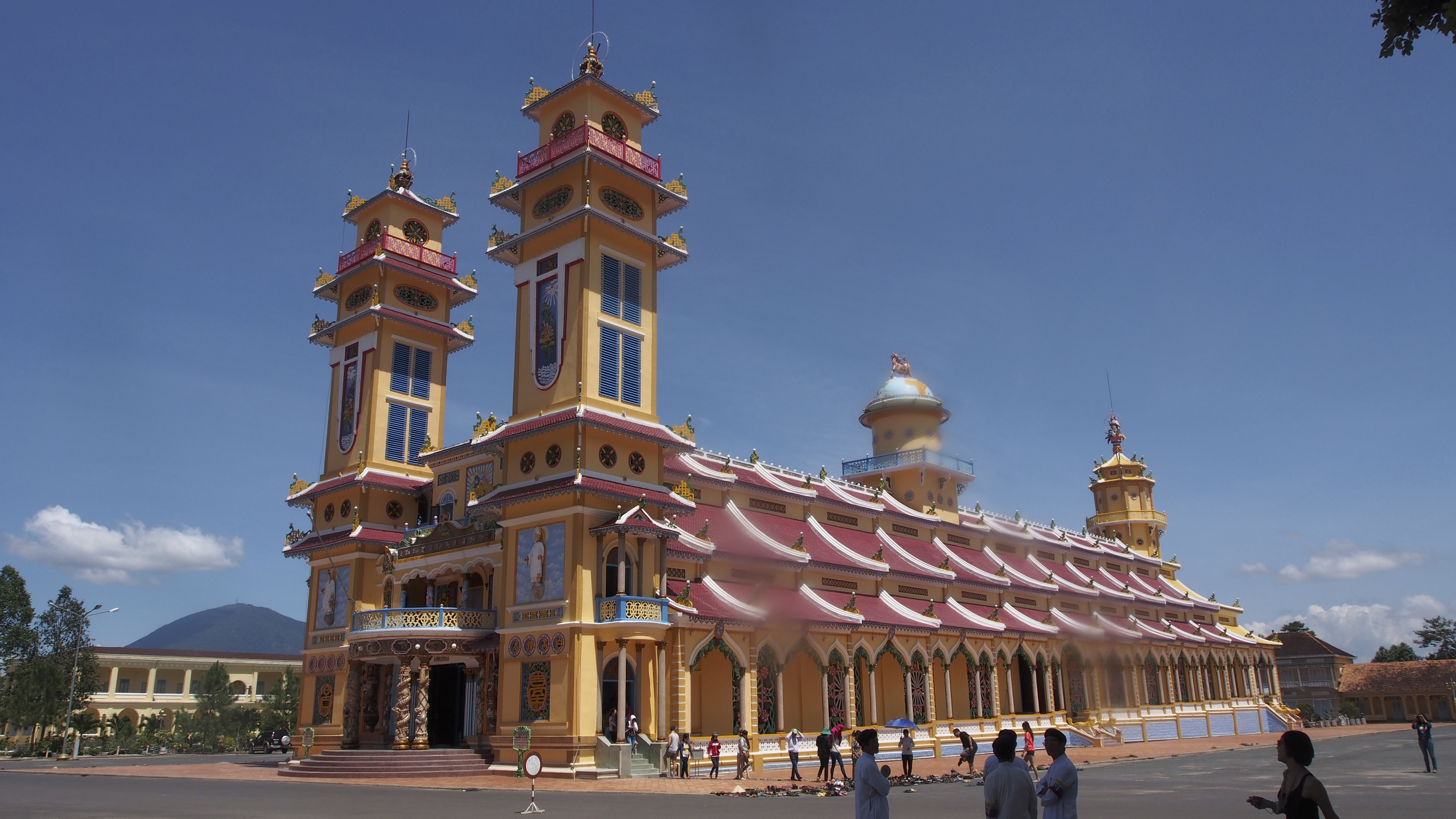
- Tây Ninh Holy See of the Cao Đài faith

- Location in Vietnam
- Coordinates: 11°17′11″N 106°7′46″E
- Country: Vietnam
- Province: Tây Ninh
- Time zone: UTC+07:00 (Indochina Time)
- Climate: Aw

Long Hoa is a ward (phường) of Tây Ninh Province, Vietnam.

== Geography ==
Long Hoa Ward is a ward located in the northern part of Tây Ninh Province, situated approximately 110 km north of Long An Ward and about 6 km southeast of Tân Ninh Ward. The ward also serves as the center of the northern region of Tây Ninh Province; formerly part of the Hòa Thành area, it possesses the following geographical location:

- To the North, it borders the wards of Ninh Thạnh and Tân Ninh.
- To the Northeast, it borders the commune of Cầu Khởi.
- To the South, it borders the commune of Thạnh Đức.
- To the Southwest, it borders the commune of Long Chữ, with the Vàm Cỏ Đông River serving as the boundary.
- To the West, it borders the wards of Thanh Điền and Hòa Thành.

According to Official Dispatch No. 2896/BNV-CQĐP dated May 27, 2025, issued by the Ministry of Home Affairs, following the administrative reorganization, Long Hoa Ward covers an area of 55.99 km². As of December 31, 2024, the ward had a population of 106,017 people, resulting in a population density of 0 people/km² (statistical data calculated as of December 31, 2024, in accordance with the provisions of Article 6 of Resolution No. 76/2025/UBTVQH15, dated April 14, 2025, issued by the National Assembly Standing Committee)).

== Administration divisions ==
Long Hoa Ward is divided into 24 residential quarters: 1, 2, 3, 4, Long Đại, Long Hải, Long Mỹ, Long Tân, Long Thời, Năm Trại, Sân Cu, Trường An, Trường Ân, Trường Cửu, Trường Đức, Trường Giang, Trường Huệ, Trường Lộc, Trường Lưu, Trường Phú, Trường Phước, Trường Thiện, Trường Thọ, and Trường Xuân.

== History ==
After 1975, the communes of Long Thành and Trường Hòa belonged to Phú Khương District. Notably, Long Thành Commune served as the district seat of Hòa Khương District.

On March 14, 1979, the Government Council issued Decision 115-CP, renaming Phú Khương District in Tây Ninh Province to Hòa Thành District. Consequently, the name of the district was officially changed from Phú Khương to Hòa Thành.

On April 4, 1979, the Government Council issued Decision 143-CP regarding the adjustment of administrative boundaries and the renaming of communes within Hòa Thành District, Tây Ninh Province. Accordingly:

- Long Thành Commune was divided into the following communes and town, based on the entire natural area and population size of its constituent hamlets:
- # Long Thành Bắc Commune, comprising the hamlets of Long Tân, Long Thới, Long Mỹ, and Long Đại.
- # Long Thành Trung Commune, comprising the hamlets of Long Kim, Long Thới, Long Trung, and Long Chí.
- # Long Thành Nam Commune, comprising the hamlets of Long Hải, Long Bình, Long Khương, Long Yên, and Long Chi.
- # Hòa Thành Town, comprising the residential quarters of Long Hoa, Long Thúy, and Long Vân. At this time, Hòa Thành Town became the district seat of Hòa Thành District.
- Trường Hòa Commune was divided into the following communes, based on the entire natural area and population size of its constituent hamlets:
- # Trường Hòa Commune, comprising the hamlets of Trường Thọ, Trường Cửu, Trường Xuân, and Trường Thiện.
- # Trường Đông Commune, comprising the hamlets of Trường Lưu, Trường Phú, Trường Đức, and Trường Ân.
- # Trường Tây Commune, comprising the hamlets of Trường Phước, Trường Lộc, Trường Huệ, and Trường An.

On April 21, 2016, the expanded area of Hòa Thành Town was recognized as a Grade IV urban area. On December 28, 2018, the entire Hòa Thành District (comprising Hòa Thành Town and its 7 subordinate communes) was recognized as a Grade IV urban area.

On January 10, 2020, the National Assembly Standing Committee issued Resolution No. 865/NQ-UBTVQH14 (effective from February 1, 2020) regarding the establishment of Hòa Thành Town and Trảng Bàng Town, as well as the establishment of wards and communes within Hòa Thành Town and Trảng Bàng Town, Tây Ninh Province. Accordingly:

- Hòa Thành Town was established based on the entire natural area and population size of Hòa Thành District.
- Long Hoa Ward was established based on the entire natural area and population size of Hòa Thành Town.
- Long Thành Bắc Ward was established based on the entire natural area and population size of Long Thành Bắc Commune.

On February 10, 2025, the Ministry of Construction issued Decision No. 112/QĐ-BXD recognizing Hòa Thành Town as a Grade III urban area.

On June 16, 2025, the National Assembly Standing Committee issued Resolution No. 1682/NQ-UBTVQH15 regarding the reorganization of commune-level administrative units in Tây Ninh Province in 2025 (effective from June 16, 2025). Accordingly, the entire natural area and population of Long Thanh Bac Ward, Long Hoa Ward, and the communes of Truong Hoa, Truong Tay, and Truong Dong—formerly part of the town of Hòa Thành—are consolidated into a new ward named Long Hoa Ward (Clause 90, Article 1).

On March 13, 2026, the People's Committee of Tay Ninh Province issued Decision No. 3943/QĐ-UBND, recognizing the urban area of Hoa Thanh as a Class II urban area following the transitional period. Long Hoa Ward (part of the Hoa Thanh urban area) has attained the urban development level prescribed for administrative units situated within a Class II urban area.

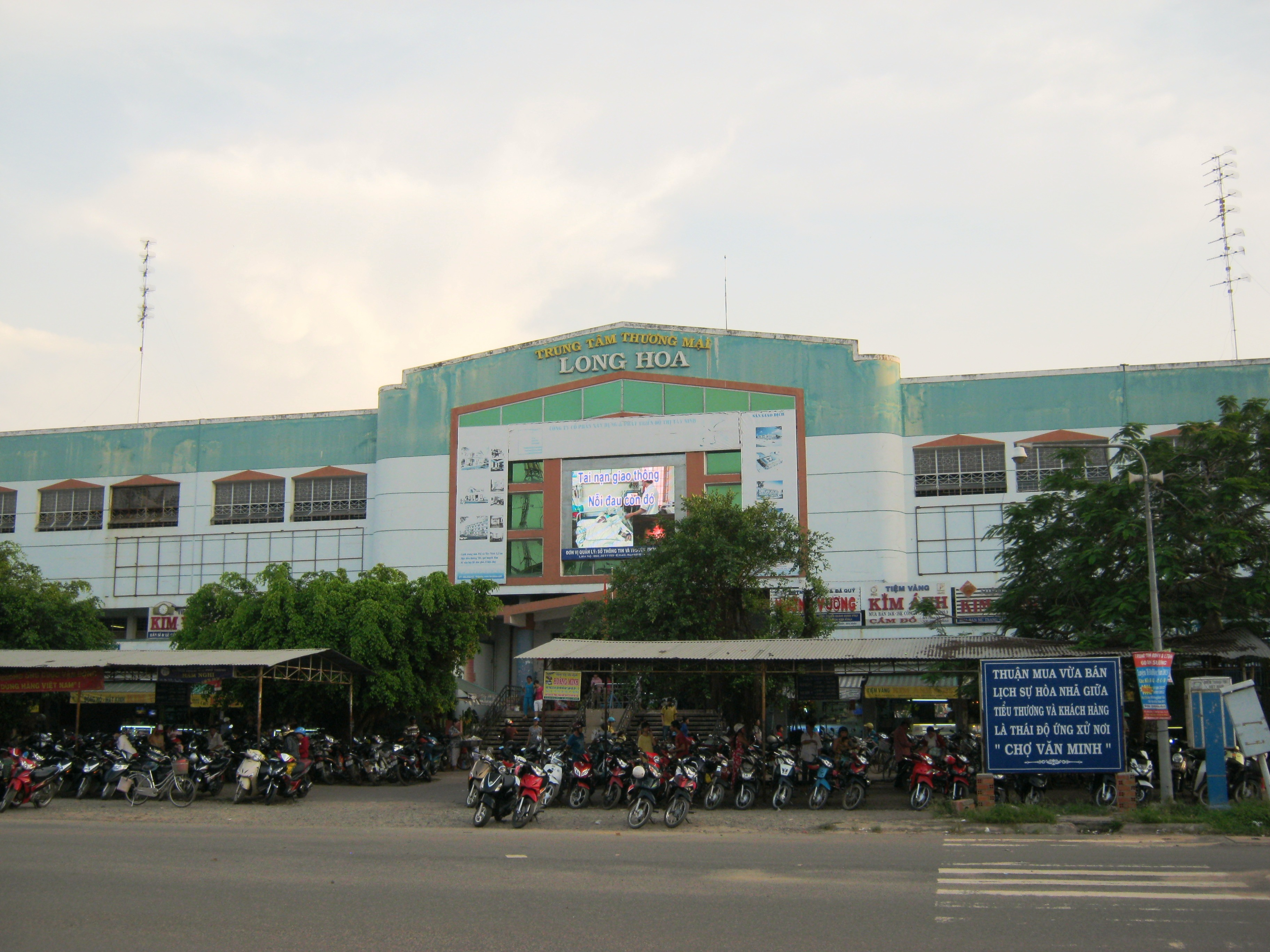
Long Hoa Market
