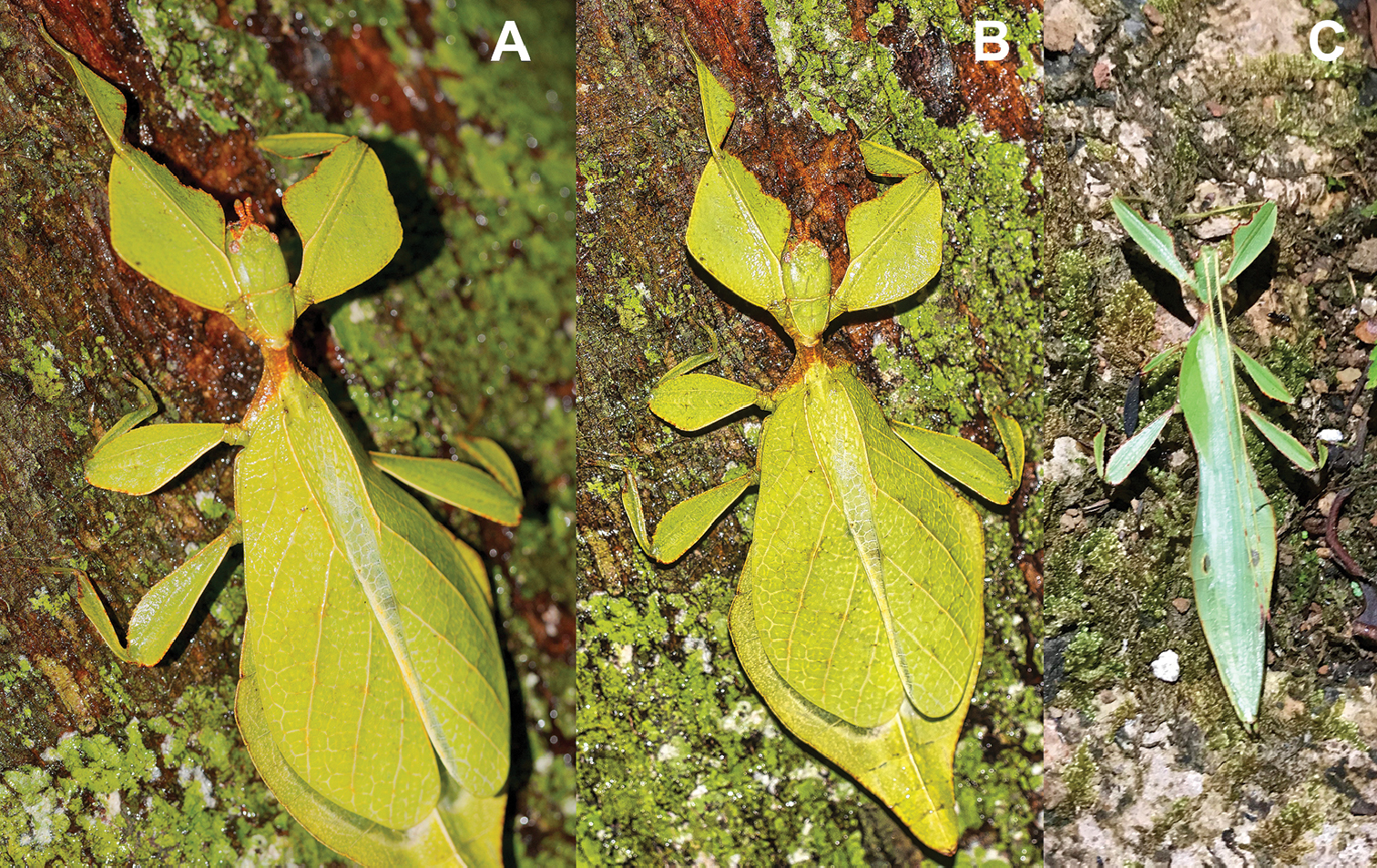
- A and B females, C male

Scientific classification
- Kingdom: Animalia
- Phylum: Arthropoda
- Clade: Pancrustacea
- Class: Insecta
- Order: Phasmatodea
- Family: Phylliidae
- Genus: Cryptophyllium
- Species: C. athanysus

Binomial name
- Cryptophyllium athanysus (Westwood, 1859)

Synonyms
- Phyllium athanysus Westwood, 1859

= Cryptophyllium athanysus =

Species of stick insect

Cryptophyllium athanysus, is a species of phasmid or stick insect. It is the smalles species of the Phylliidae (leaf insects) genus Cryptophyllium and is found in Sri Lanka.
