= Krông Bông district =

Coordinates: 12.500°N 108.500°E

Krông Bông district Huyện Krông Bông
- District
- Interactive map of Krông Bông district
- Country: Vietnam
- Region: Central Highlands
- Province: Đắk Lắk
- Capital: Krông Kmar

Area
  - Land: 480 sq mi (1,250 km^{2})

Population (2018)
  - Total: 94,560
- Time zone: UTC+7 (Indochina Time)

Krông Bông is a former rural district of Đắk Lắk province, Central Highlands (Vietnam).

== History ==
Its name originates from Krông-bông, which is one of the two branches of Krông-ană. It means "the windy river" in Rhade language.

== Geography ==
=== Administration ===
The capital of Krông Bông rural district is Krông Kmar township ("the stormy river").

Besides, there are 13 communes : Hòa Sơn, Hòa Lễ, Hòa Phong, Hòa Thành, Hòa Tân, Cư Kty, Yàng Réh, Eă Trul, Yàng Mao, Yàng Kang, Cư Drăm, Cư Pui and Khuê Ngọc Điền.

=== Landscapes ===
A high percentage of the area is covered by tropical forest, therefore, Krông Bông's climate is relatively cool and pleasant. The average temperature is about 25 degrees Celsius.

In addition, Krông Bông has one of the largest national parks of Vietnam, Cư-yàng-sin National Park, which is named after the highest mountain in Đắk Lắk province.

Krông Kmar, the main town of Krông Bông, is a small town in a valley surrounded by the Chư Yang Sin mountain system.

== Economy ==
Unlike many other districts of Đắk Lắk, coffee is not the main crop due to Krông Bông's environmental conditions, such as the lack of red basaltic soil. Cashew, cassava and pepper are the most important agricultural products.

A large power plant has been built at Krông Kmar Waterfall to supply electricity for the entire surrounding area.

As of 2003, the district had a population of 82,530. The district covers an area of 1,250 km^{2}. The district capital lies at Krông Kmar.

== See also ==
- Krông Ana district
