= Cư Pui =

- Commune
- Interactive map of Cư Pui
- Country: Vietnam
- Region: Central Highlands
- Province: Đắk Lắk

Area
  - Total: 173.31 km^{2} (66.92 sq mi)

Population (1999)
  - Total: 3,630
  - Density: 32.5/km^{2} (84/sq mi)
- Time zone: UTC+07:00 (Indochina Time)

Cư Pui is a commune (xã) in Đắk Lắk Province, Vietnam. In 1999, the commune had a population of 5,630. The commune was officially established on February 2, 1987. It borders the communes of Ea Trang, Cư Drăm, Hòa Phong and Cư Elang and is located within the Chư Yang Sin National Park.
