= Tà Đùng National Park =

National Park in Vietnam

Vườn quốc gia Tà Đùng
- Tà Đùng National Park
- IUCN category II (national park)
- Location within Vietnam
- Location: (Vietnam) Lâm Đồng, Việt Nam
- Nearest city: Đồng Nai
- Coordinates: 11°53.4′N 107°55′E
- Area: 20,937.7 hectares (51,738 acres; 209 km^{2}; 81 sq mi)
- Established: 2018
- Governing body: People's Committee of Đắk Nông Province

Tà Đùng National Park (Vietnamese: Vườn quốc gia Tà Đùng) is located in Lâm Đồng province, Vietnam. With an area of about 20,938 hectares, the national park was established on 8 February 2018, having been upgraded from the former Tà Đùng nature reserve. The National Park has 3 functional subdivisions including: [i] strict protection zone, [ii] ecological restoration zones and [iii] the service - administration subdivision.

The Park is about 45 km from Nam Gia Nghĩa ward, and is in Tà Đùng commune: straddling National Highway 28 for about 45 km southeast, until the former border with Lâm Đồng province going towards Di Linh. Tà Đùng is bounded in the south by the upper Dong Nai river, between Dong Nai 3 and 4 hydropower projects. The Park includes the highest mountain range in Lâm Đồng province, a geographical and biological intersection between the South Central Coast and Central Highlands and the Southeast region: the border between former Đắk Nông and Lâm Đồng provinces follows the original course of the river before the lake was created.

== History ==
For generations, the Ma people living at the foot of the mountain still sing and tell epic stories about the majestic Tà Đùng mountain, with the name of each stream and hill having a character. In a magazine article, the village elder K'Cha who was 94 years old, is described teaching younger generations about the conservation of the forest and the legend of Tà Đùng mountain, which is crucial for the lives of the villagers.

== Ecosystem services, flora and fauna ==
Tà Đùng National Park functions include: protecting forest resources, conserving rare or endangered organisms and riparian zone protection especially for the Đồng Nai River basin. The latter provides water for domestic use, electricity production, and industrial and agricultural production in the Southeast region. The Park also provides protected areas for scientific research, training, sightseeing, eco-tourism, and environmental education.

Most of the land consists of upland seasonal tropical forests and a large lake with more than 36 substantial islands. The National Park was created on the basis of its diverse flora and fauna, thought to include: deer, leopard, primates, peacocks, pheasants, etc. Authoritative species lists appear to be currently (2023) unavailable, but it is thought that the Park contains organisms listed in the Red Book of Vietnam (at risk of extinction or a worrying decrease in numbers). Tà Đùng is one of the four endemic bird regions of Vietnam with one-eighth of the bird species recorded in Vietnam; it is one of the 222 endemic bird regions of the world.

== Tourism ==
The Da N'teng, Da P'lao streams ("da" or "dak" meaning "water") flow through the Park, forming waterfalls such as: Dak P'lao waterfall, on the way to which, visitors pass large rocks and old trees. The waterfall has a height of more than 3 m, with water flowing all year round. Standing high, looking down the slopes, are the villages of the people of Dak P'lao, Dak R'mang, and Dak Som villages. Digne Klan Waterfall is located in Dak Som commune, around the waterfall there are flat rocks, many old trees with wide canopy, you can camp and stay overnight to enjoy the surrounding mountain atmosphere. The damming of the Dong Nai river for hydroelectric power (dam No. 3) has created Tà Đùng Lake, an elevated lake with an area of nearly 6,000 hectares of water surface and formed dozens of large and small islands, which have been called the "Ha Long Central Highlands" and is being promoted as a destination of tourists. It has been suggested that adventurous tourists may also wish to climb the Tà Đùng peak (1982 metres).

== Threats ==
The national park has faced problems with illegal loggers exploiting the many large, valuable trees. The Ma people cooperate with forest rangers in attempts to thwart logging activities.
