= Đông Giang district =

Coordinates: 15°55′32.63″N 107°42′54.07″E

Đông Giang district Huyện Đông Giang
- District
- Interactive map of Đông Giang district
- Country: Vietnam
- Region: South Central Coast
- Province: Quảng Nam
- Capital: Prao

Area
  - Total: 313 sq mi (811 km^{2})

Population (2003)
  - Total: 25,320
- Time zone: UTC+7 (Indochina Time)

Đông Giang is a former rural district (huyện) of Quảng Nam province in the South Central Coast region of Vietnam. As of 2003 the district had a population of 21,191. The district covers an area of 811 km^{2} (313 sq mi). The district capital lies at Prao.
