= Hòa Thành (town) =

Former district-level town of Tây Ninh province, Vietnam

Coordinates: 11°16′59″N 106°7′47″E

Hòa Thành Phú Khương
- District-level town (Class-3)
- Hòa Thành Town; Thị xã Hòa Thành
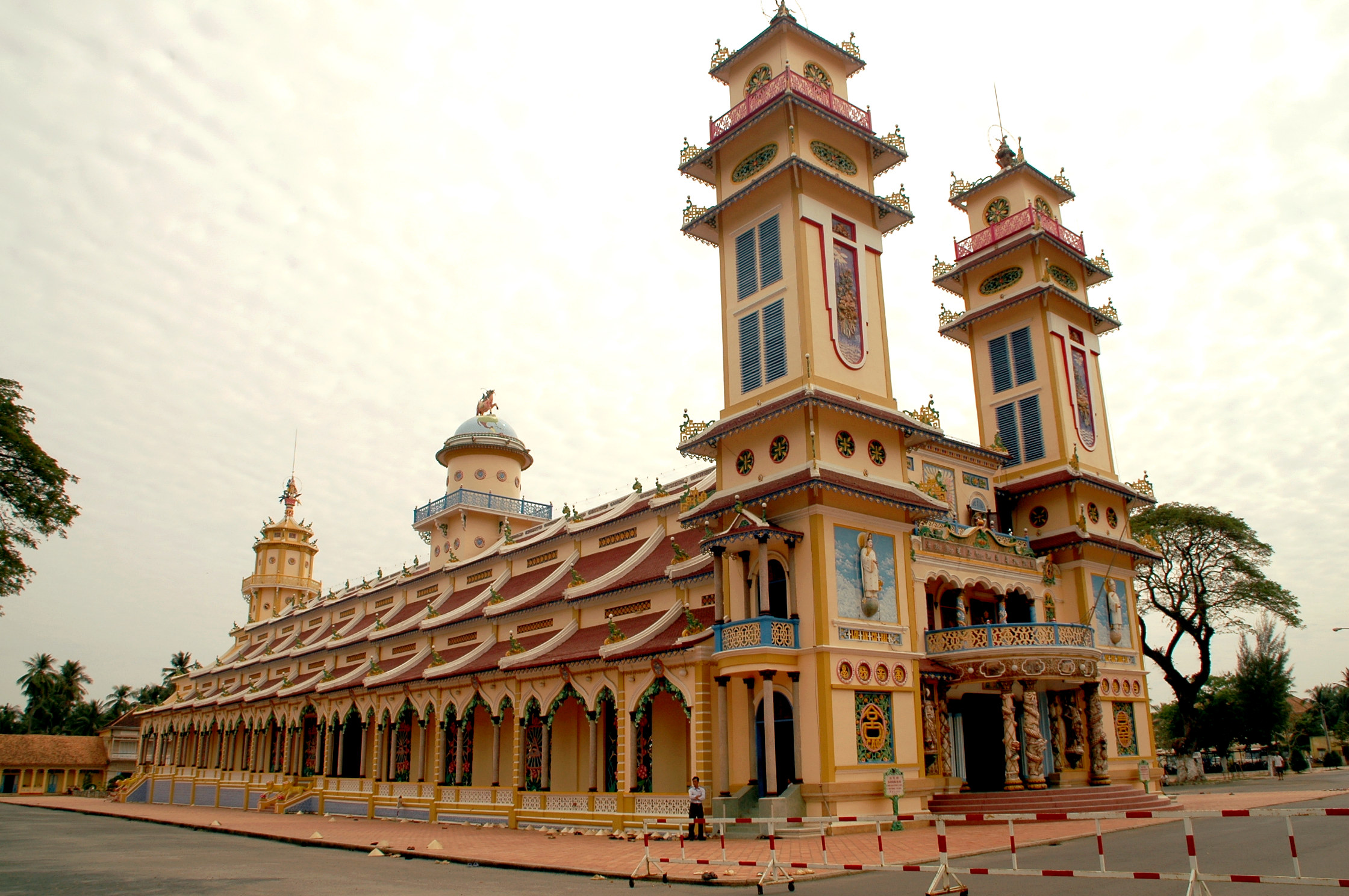
- The Great Divine Temple of the Caodaism
- Interactive map of Hòa Thành
- Location within Vietnam Location within Southeast Asia Location within Asia
- Country: Vietnam
- Region: Southeast
- Province: Tây Ninh
- Founded: February 1, 2020
- Seat: Long Hoa

Government
  - Chairman of the People's Committee: Trương Văn Hoàn
  - Chairman of the People's Council: Nguyễn Văn Phong
  - Secretary: Trần Văn Khải

Area
  - Total: 32 sq mi (82 km^{2})

Population (2018)
  - Total: 152,339
  - Ethnicities: Kinh Chinese Khmer Chams
- Time zone: UTC+7 (UTC + 7)
- National post code: 8427xx, 8428xx
- Website: hoathanh.tayninh.gov.vn

Hòa Thành, formerly named Phú Khương, is a former district-level town of Tây Ninh Province in the Southeast region of Vietnam. It is located in the centre of the province. As of 2003, it had a population of 146,400. Hòa Thành town covers an area of 82 km^{2} (32 sq mi), the town capital lies at ward of Long Hoa, which is located on National Route 22B vi, a branch road of National Route 22 entirely run in the province that connect to Xa Mát International Border Gate, 8 km southeast of Downtown Tây Ninh City and 82km northwest of Ho Chi Minh City.

The town is bordered to the north by Tây Ninh City, to the west by Châu Thành District, to the southeast by Gò Dầu and to the northeast by Dương Minh Châu District.

The current name of the town is the combination of the last word of two communes: Trường Hòa and Long Thành, the latter commune was later dissolved into Long Thành Nam commune and most of current wards of the town (except Hiệp Tân ward).

== Administrative divisions ==
The town currently divided into 8 commune-level divisions, included:

4 wards:

- Hiệp Tân
- Long Hoa
- Long Thành Bắc
- Long Thành Trung

4 communes:

- Long Thành Nam
- Trường Đông
- Trường Hòa
- Trường Tây

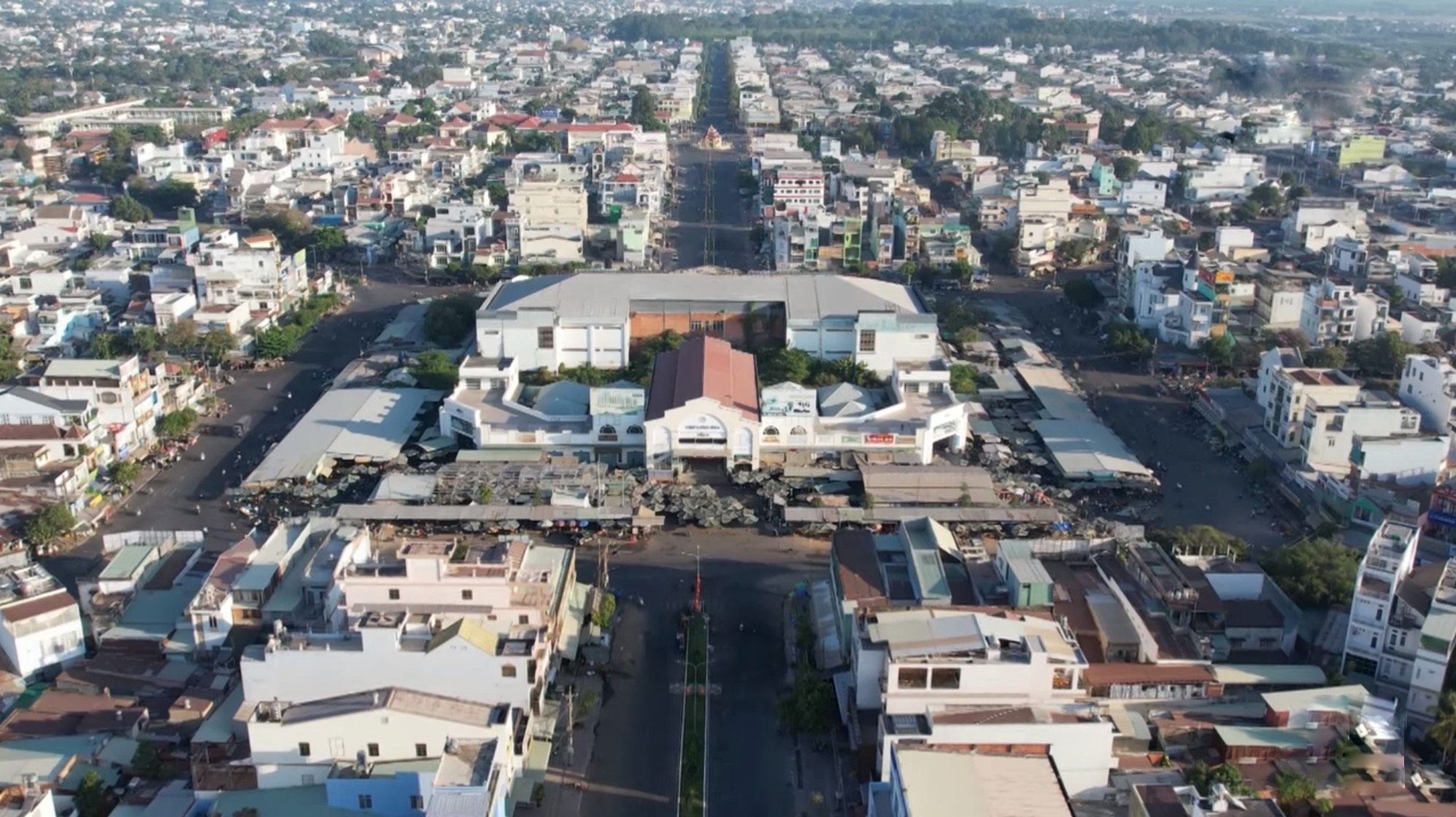
Downtown Hòa Thành with Long Hoa Market in the center

The most developed area of the town is in wards of Long Hoa and Long Thành Bắc, which have Long Hoa market, a centre commercial centre of the town, is located on a highway from Ho Chi Minh City to Tây Ninh, which extends into Cambodia and is the main trade route to Phnom Penh and beyond to Thailand. There is also an ornate Cao Đài temple; this province is the home of this 20th-century religion. The Moon Festival celebrations in the district attract 30,000 people on an annual basis and is well known in the region.
