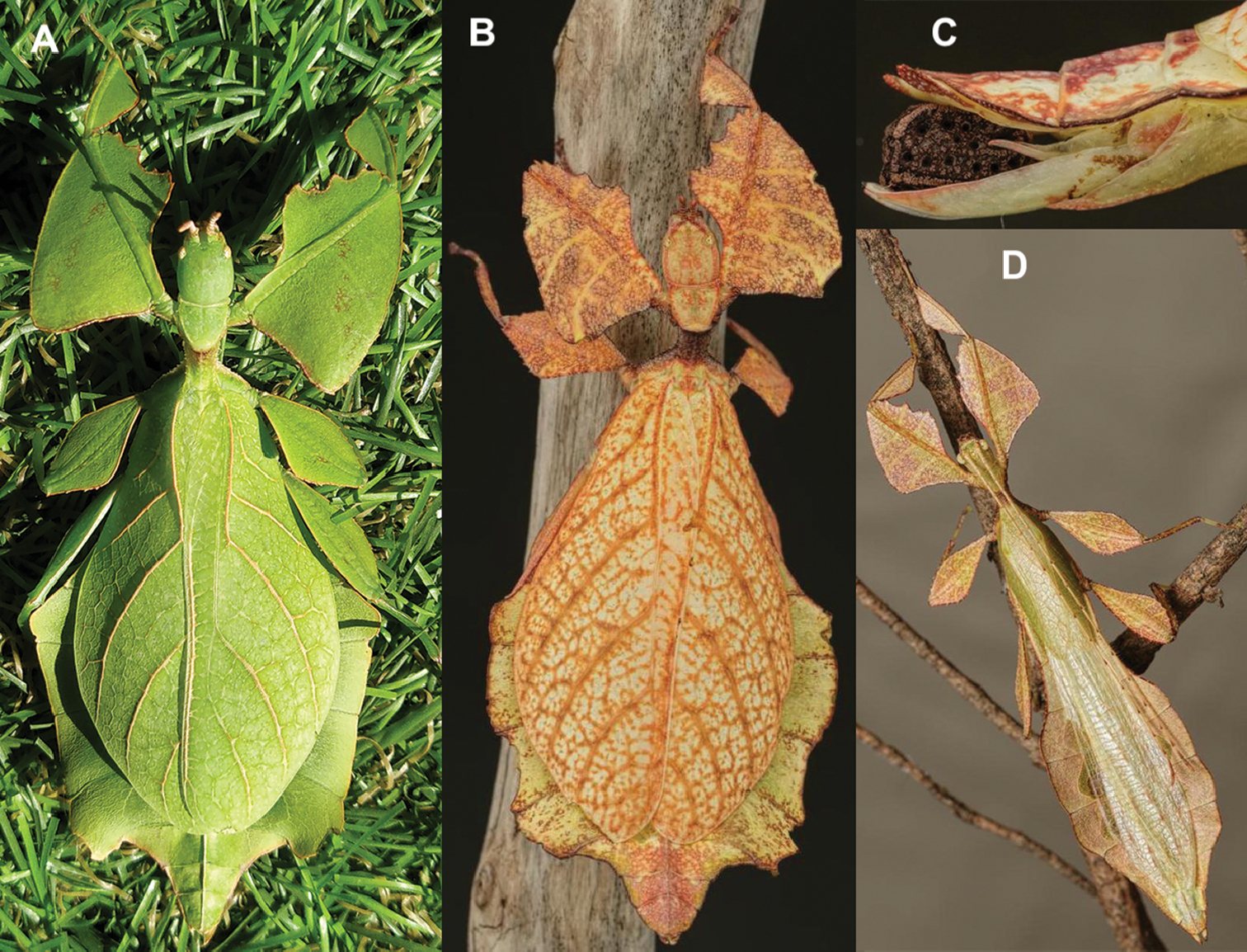
- A and B females, C end of a female abdomen with egg, D male

Scientific classification
- Kingdom: Animalia
- Phylum: Arthropoda
- Clade: Pancrustacea
- Class: Insecta
- Order: Phasmatodea
- Superfamily: Phyllioidea
- Family: Phylliidae
- Tribe: Phylliini
- Genus: Cryptophyllium
- Species: C. celebicum

Binomial name
- Cryptophyllium celebicum (de Haan, 1842)

Synonyms
- Phyllium celebicum de Haan, 1842

= Cryptophyllium celebicum =

Species of leaf insect

Cryptophyllium celebicum, simply known as walking leaf mimic insect, is type species of leaf insect in the new (2021) genus Cryptophyllium, which has been placed the tribe Phylliini. Its recorded distribution is Sulawesi and Ambon Island.
