= Thái Sơn =

- Commune
- Interactive map of Thái Sơn
- Coordinates: 22°1′26″N 105°5′42″E
- Country: Vietnam
- Province: Tuyên Quang
- Region: Northeast
- Established: 1967
- Seat: Thôn 4 Thái Bình

Area
  - Total: 93.54 km^{2} (36.12 sq mi)

Population (2025)
  - Total: 16,385
  - Density: 175/km^{2} (450/sq mi)

Thái Sơn is a commune in Tuyên Quang province, Vietnam.

The commune covers an area of 93.54 km^{2} (36.12 sq mi) and had a population of 16,385 in 2025, with a population density of 175 inhabitants per square kilometre.

== History ==
The area of present-day Thái Sơn commune was formerly part of Hàm Yên district, Tuyên Quang province.

On 16 June 2025:

- The National Assembly of Vietnam adopted Resolution No. 203/2025/QH15, amending and supplementing several articles of the Constitution of Vietnam. The resolution took effect on 16 June 2025. The resolution provided for the termination of district-level administrative units nationwide from 1 July 2025.
- The Standing Committee of the National Assembly of Vietnam issued Resolution No. 1684/NQ-UBTVQH15 on the reorganization of commune-level administrative units in Tuyên Quang province in 2025, which took effect on 16 June 2025. Under the resolution, the entire area and population of the former communes of Thành Long and Thái Sơn were consolidated to form a new commune named Thái Sơn.
