= Hòa Sơn =

- Commune
- Interactive map of Hòa Sơn
- Coordinates: 12.500327588672436°N 108.34959034297175°E
- Country: Vietnam
- Region: South Central Coast and Central Highlands
- Province: Đắk Lắk

Area
  - Total: 108.55 km^{2} (41.91 sq mi)

Population (31 December 2024)
  - Total: 25,392
  - Density: 233/km^{2} (600/sq mi)

Hòa Sơn is a commune in Đắk Lắk province, Vietnam.

On 16 June 2025:

- District-level administrative units throughout Vietnam ceased operations from 1 July 2025.
- The entire area and population of Yang Reh, Ea Trul, and Hòa Sơn communes, formerly part of Krông Bông district, Đắk Lắk province, were merged to form a new commune named Hòa Sơn.
