= Vomer (Phasmatodea) =

Morphological feature of Phasmatodea

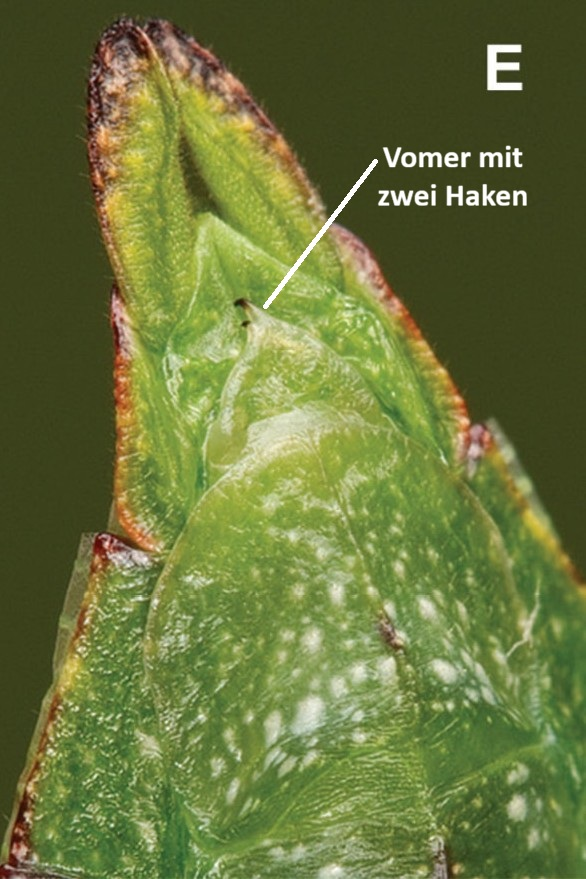
Ventral view of the abdominal end of Cryptophyllium oyae

The vomer (/ˈvoʊmər/; Latin: vomer, lit. 'ploughshare') refers to a movable sclerite of the tenth sternum of the abdomen of most male stick insects. It serves to anchor the male to the seventh abdominal sternum of the female during copulation and is considered an apomorphic characteristic of the order. The mostly triangular structure is often specifically shaped and relevant for the taxonomic classification of stick insects.

During copulation, the posterior margin of the female's sternum 7 is clamped between the vomer and the male's dorsal tergum 10, which extends beyond the tip of the abdomen. The part of tergum 10 visible from the ventral side may be covered with spines. A strongly sclerotized indentation, called the preopercular organ, is often found on the posterior margin of the seventh sternum of females. In many species the vomer is absent in males, or alternatively other clamping organs may be present.

Among the leaf insects of the genus Phyllium, in addition to the typical representatives with one apical hook on the vomer, there are also those with two apical hooks. These specimens are now considered representatives of a "hidden genus", only identified through molecular genetic studies, that was described in 2021 as Cryptophyllium.
