= Hiệp Hòa district =

Coordinates: 21.333°N 105.967°E

Hiệp Hòa district Huyện Hiệp Hòa
- District
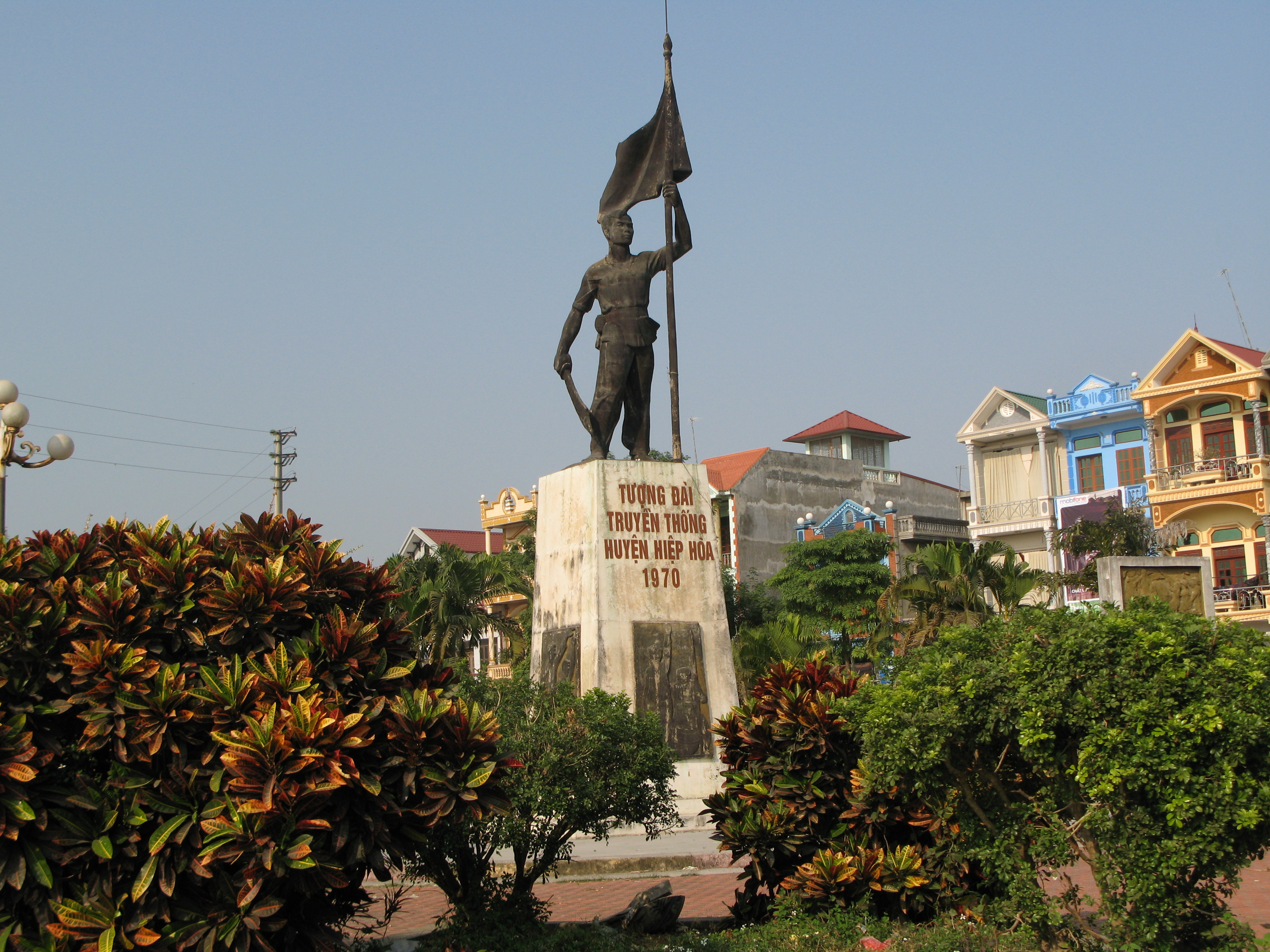
- The statue in the center of Hiệp Hòa district, Bắc Giang province

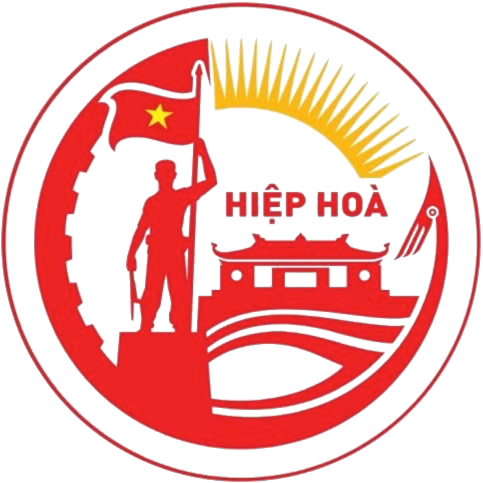
- Seal
- Interactive map of Hiệp Hòa district
- Country: Vietnam
- Province: Bắc Giang
- Capital: Thắng

Government
  - Party Secretary: Nguyễn Thị Hoa
  - People's Council Chairman: Phạm Văn Thịnh
  - People's Committee Chairman: Vũ Chí Kỳ

Area
  - District: 78 sq mi (201 km^{2})

Population (2023)
  - District: 280,000
  - Density: 3,600/sq mi (1,400/km^{2})
  - Urban: 5,931
- Time zone: UTC+7 (Indochina Time)
- Website: bacgiang.gov.vn/huyenhiephoa

Hiệp Hòa is one of seven former rural districts of Bắc Giang province in the Northeast region of Vietnam. As of 2019 the district had a population of 247,460. The district covers an area of 201 km^{2}. The district capital lies at Thắng. This is the home country of Trạng nguyên Đoàn Xuân Lôi of the Trần dynasty, Tiến sĩ Trịnh Ngô Dụng of the Lê dynasty, and Đình nguyên Nguyễn Đình Tuân of the Nguyễn dynasty.

== Geography ==
Hiệp Hòa District borders to the north with Tân Yên district, to the south with Yên Phong district, to the east with Việt Yên town, and to the west with Thái Nguyên province and Sóc Sơn district of Hanoi.

- The total natural land area of the district is 20,110 hectares
- Agricultural land is 13,479 hectares or 67%
- Forest land occupies 190.3 ha or 0.9%
- Unused land occupies 1,653.2 ha or 8.2%

Land type varies and is suitable for different types of agriculture; the district also supports industry.

== Administrative divisions ==
The district is divided into one township (thị trấn) Thắng, and 25 communes (xã): Bắc Lý, Châu Minh, Đại Thành, Danh Thắng, Đoan Bái, Đông Lỗ, Đồng Tân, Đức Thắng, Hòa Sơn, Hoàng An, Hoàng Lương, Hoàng Thanh, Hoàng Vân, Hợp Thịnh, Hùng Sơn, Hương Lâm, Lương Phong, Mai Đình, Mai Trung, Ngọc Sơn, Quang Minh, Thái Sơn, Thanh Vân, Thường Thắng, and Xuân Cẩm.

== Topography ==
Hiệp Hòa is topographically uneven, with hills and low mountains in some communes in the north, the Red River Delta in the east and generally sloped from the northwest to the southeast.

== Climate ==
The weather is influenced by the tropical monsoon, with the average temperature being 23-24 degrees Celsius, and the average annual rainfall is 1,500 mm.

Climate data for Hiệp Hòa
| Month | Jan | Feb | Mar | Apr | May | Jun | Jul | Aug | Sep | Oct | Nov | Dec | Year |
|---|---|---|---|---|---|---|---|---|---|---|---|---|---|
| Record high °C (°F) | 31.5 (88.7) | 33.7 (92.7) | 35.8 (96.4) | 39.0 (102.2) | 39.0 (102.2) | 40.0 (104.0) | 38.5 (101.3) | 39.0 (102.2) | 38.0 (100.4) | 36.2 (97.2) | 35.0 (95.0) | 30.4 (86.7) | 40.0 (104.0) |
| Mean daily maximum °C (°F) | 19.5 (67.1) | 20.6 (69.1) | 22.9 (73.2) | 27.1 (80.8) | 31.2 (88.2) | 32.9 (91.2) | 32.7 (90.9) | 32.2 (90.0) | 31.6 (88.9) | 29.3 (84.7) | 25.8 (78.4) | 22.1 (71.8) | 27.3 (81.1) |
| Daily mean °C (°F) | 16.1 (61.0) | 17.6 (63.7) | 20.0 (68.0) | 23.8 (74.8) | 27.1 (80.8) | 28.9 (84.0) | 28.9 (84.0) | 28.3 (82.9) | 27.4 (81.3) | 24.9 (76.8) | 21.3 (70.3) | 17.7 (63.9) | 23.5 (74.3) |
| Mean daily minimum °C (°F) | 13.8 (56.8) | 15.5 (59.9) | 18.1 (64.6) | 21.6 (70.9) | 24.2 (75.6) | 25.9 (78.6) | 26.0 (78.8) | 25.6 (78.1) | 24.5 (76.1) | 21.9 (71.4) | 18.2 (64.8) | 14.7 (58.5) | 20.8 (69.4) |
| Record low °C (°F) | 4.5 (40.1) | 5.6 (42.1) | 7.2 (45.0) | 12.5 (54.5) | 16.2 (61.2) | 20.3 (68.5) | 20.7 (69.3) | 21.6 (70.9) | 16.8 (62.2) | 12.3 (54.1) | 8.3 (46.9) | 2.4 (36.3) | 2.4 (36.3) |
| Average precipitation mm (inches) | 23.4 (0.92) | 25.1 (0.99) | 48.1 (1.89) | 99.9 (3.93) | 185.3 (7.30) | 243.5 (9.59) | 272.2 (10.72) | 273.8 (10.78) | 188.9 (7.44) | 130.8 (5.15) | 51.2 (2.02) | 23.1 (0.91) | 1,577.8 (62.12) |
| Average rainy days | 8.1 | 9.6 | 14.2 | 13.1 | 13.6 | 14.7 | 15.5 | 15.7 | 11.7 | 8.9 | 6.3 | 5.1 | 137.9 |
| Average relative humidity (%) | 81.6 | 83.5 | 87.1 | 88.1 | 84.4 | 83.7 | 84.1 | 85.9 | 83.1 | 80.9 | 78.1 | 77.2 | 83.1 |
| Mean monthly sunshine hours | 63.3 | 43.8 | 46.9 | 81.4 | 174.9 | 175.0 | 193.3 | 183.3 | 196.1 | 173.6 | 147.9 | 128.7 | 1,609 |
Source: Vietnam Institute for Building Science and Technology, Nchmf.gov.vn (August record high)

== Natural resources ==
=== Forest ===
The district has a lack of natural forest; forest plantings have been accomplished in seven communes, totalling 167 hectares.

=== Sand and gravel ===
The district has resources of construction industry-quality sand and gravel.

=== Water ===
Hiệp Hòa's water supply for agricultural use is plentiful, drawn from ponds and the Cầu River system.

== Infrastructure ==
=== Electricity ===
By 2003 the national electricity grid has covered 26 of 26 towns and reached 100% of villages. The district now has 124 transformers with capacity of 16,525 kVA.

=== Water ===
Residents mainly use water from well], as well as natural river water and rainwater. The district has 34,788 wells. 2,600 households are using natural river water. Overall about 70% of the population have water in the toilets. Currently, the water project in Quảng Minh is in the process of funding and construction.

=== Transportation ===
District Highway 37 runs 14 km in-district; 3 provincial highways - Road 295, Road 296 and Road 367 - have a total length of 39.6 km. Roads linking communes total 103.2 km and roads linking villages and hamlets total nearly 600 km. Highways and provincial roads are 100% paved.

=== Communication ===
Each commune has a post office in the commune cultural center. Many households and every village have a telephone. Daily newspapers and magazines enjoy good circulation.

== Manpower ==
The 2006 district population was more than 300,000 people; people of labor age total 133,650 people or 44.8% of the population. The proportion of agricultural workers, though still large, has been reduced as industrialization and the development of industrial parks continues apace.
