= Krông Bông =

Krông Bông Xã Krông Bông
- Commune
- Krông Bông commune
- Location within Vietnam
- Coordinates: 12°30′17″N 108°19′57″E
- Country: Vietnam
- Region: Central Highlands
- Province: Đắk Lắk
- Time zone: UTC+7 (UTC + 7)

Krông Bông is a commune (xã) of Đắk Lắk Province, Vietnam. It is one of the 102 new wards and communes of the province following the reorganization in 2025.

On June 16, 2025, the Standing Committee of the National Assembly issued Resolution No. 1660/NQ-UBTVQH15 on the reorganization of commune-level administrative units in Đắk Lắk Province in 2025 (the resolution took effect on the date of its adoption). Accordingly, the entire natural area and population of Krông Kmar Township, Hòa Lễ Commune, and Khuê Ngọc Điền Commune were consolidated to establish a new commune named Krông Bông Commune.
