= Xuân Cẩm =

Coordinates: 18°12′N 106°12′E

- Commune and village
- Interactive map of Xuân Cẩm
- Country: Vietnam
- City: Bắc Ninh
- Time zone: UTC+07:00
- Website: xuancam.bacninh.gov.vn

Xuân Cẩm is a commune (xã) and village in Bắc Ninh, in northeastern Vietnam.
