= Hiệp Hòa, Bắc Ninh =

Hiệp Hòa
- Ward
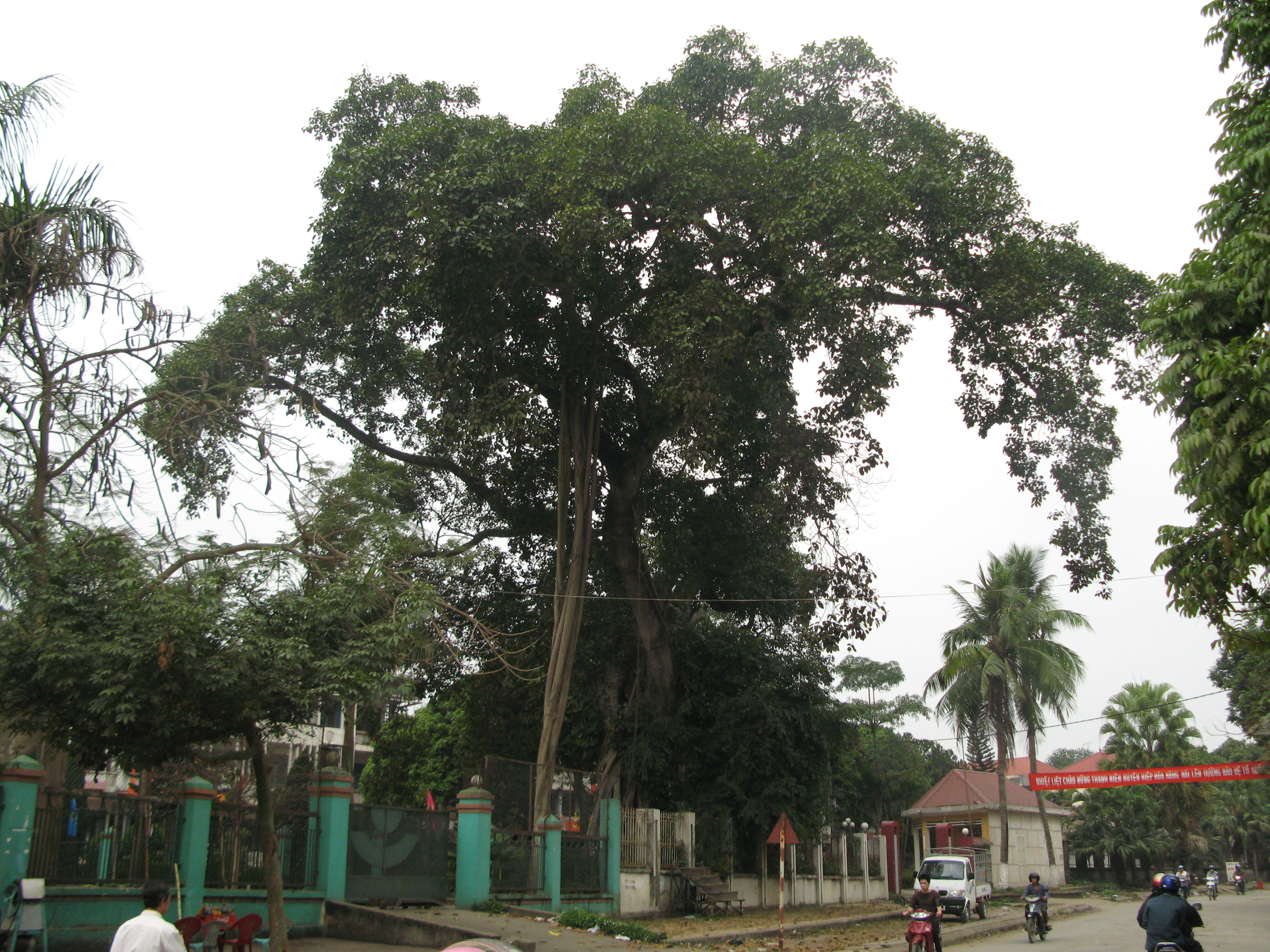

- Location in Vietnam
- Coordinates: 21°21′20″N 105°58′39″E
- Country: Vietnam
- City: Bắc Ninh
- Established: 1945

Area
  - Total: 0.48 sq mi (1.24 km^{2})

Population (2010)
  - Total: 5,000
  - Density: 10,440/sq mi (4,032/km^{2})
- Time zone: UTC+07:00

Hiệp Hòa is a ward (phường) Bắc Ninh, in north-eastern Vietnam.
