= Hợp Thịnh, Bắc Ninh =

Coordinates: 21°19′40″N 105°54′25″E

Hợp Thịnh
- Commune and village
- Interactive map of Hợp Thịnh
- Country: Vietnam
- City: Bắc Ninh
- Time zone: UTC+07:00

Hợp Thịnh is a commune (xã) in Bắc Ninh, in northeastern Vietnam.
