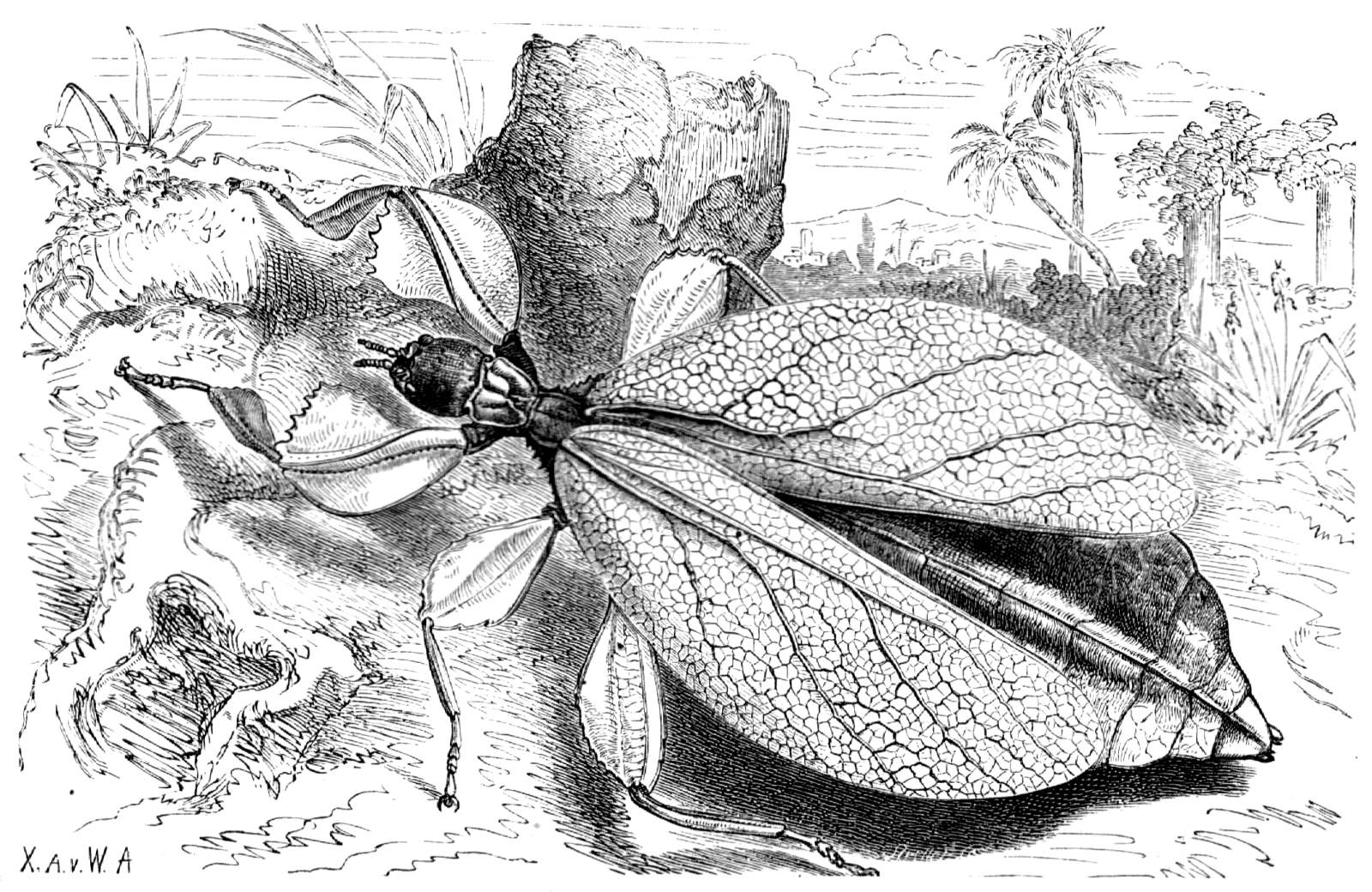
- Phyllium siccifolium, depiction of a female in Brehm's Animal Life

Scientific classification
- Kingdom: Animalia
- Phylum: Arthropoda
- Clade: Pancrustacea
- Class: Insecta
- Order: Phasmatodea
- Superfamily: Phyllioidea
- Family: Phylliidae
- Tribe: Phylliini
- Genus: Phyllium
- Species: P. siccifolium

Binomial name
- Phyllium siccifolium (Linnaeus, 1758)

Synonyms
- Phyllium brevicorne Latreille, 1807; Phasma chlorophyllia Houttuyn, 1813; Phasma citrifolium Lichtenstein, 1796; Phyllium donovani Gray, G.R., 1835; Mantis foliatus Perry, 1811; Gryllus folium lauri Linnaeus, 1754; Phyllium gorgon Gray, G.R., 1835; Phyllium stollii Lepeletier & Serville, 1825

= Phyllium siccifolium =

Species of stick insect

Phyllium siccifolium (from Greek φύλλον = leaf and Latin siccus = dry, folium = leaf – 'dry leaf') is the species of the leaf insects (Phyllioidea) known to science for the longest time. It was described by Carl von Linné as early as 1758 and is thus, along with Phasma gigas and Pseudophasma phthisicus, one of the three first described Stick Insect species. The species is called Linnaeus' Leaf Insect in honor of its species describer.

== Taxonomy ==
Phyllium siccifolium was described by Linnaeus in 1758 as Gryllus (Mantis) siccifolius. The female holotype is deposited at the Zoological Institute of the University of Uppsala and labeled with the locality India. Johann Christian Fabricius reorganized the genera and subgenera established by Linnaeus in 1775 and used the genus Gryllus for representatives of the later Orthoptera, whereby the name now became Mantis siccifolia. Pierre André Latreille transferred the species to the genus Phyllium in 1802 as Phyllium siccifolia. The genus Mantis was left to the later Mantodea. The genus Phyllium, established by Johann Karl Wilhelm Illiger in 1798 and published by Latreille in 1802, was specifically created for Phyllium siccifolia, the spelling used, which thus became the type species through monotypy.

The species was described several times in the 18th and 19th centuries under the various names. These are now considered synonyms of Phyllium siccifolium. Due to regrouping of the species or its synonyms into other genera as well as misspellings, Phyllium siccifolium is currently (August 2025) assigned a total of 17 synonyms. Since the genus was divided into subgenera, the species has been assigned to the former subgenus Phyllium, which differs from the former subgenus Pulchriphyllium by the absence of lobes on the outer side of the foretibia.

Frank H. Hennemann et al. proposed in 2009 that the genus Phyllium be divided into species groups below the now former subgenera. Phyllium siccifolium is proposed as the eponymous species for the siccifolium species group. In 2009, Hennemann et al. also synonymized Phyllium tobeloense with Phyllium siccfolium. Detlef Größer, who described this species in 2007 based, among other things, on an egg taken from the ovipositor, points out that Hennemann et al. used this same method in their work to differentiate and describe Phyllium mindorense. Phyllium tobeloense has now been recognized again as a valid species, to which the subspecies Phyllium tobeloense bhaskarai has belonged since 2019, in whose description Hennemann was involved.

Based on comparative studies of the internal sclerites of females, as well as eggs and hatchlings, Größer shows that Phyllium bilobatum, Phyllium hausleithneri and Phyllium philippinicum have very similar yet highly variable characteristics, suggesting that they could also be synonyms or subspecies of Phyllium siccifolium. Sarah Bank et al., in their molecular genetic analyses, also examined samples of Phyllium siccifolium, Phyllium hausleithneri and Phyllium philippinicum, all of which turned out to be distinct species.

== Distribution ==
Although the species' actual distribution area is not yet definitively known, its occurrence in the Moluccas is considered certain. This can be explained by the fact that the holotype collected most likely originated from Ambon Island or a neighboring Moluccan island. Besides Ambon, Phyllium siccifolium also occurs on the islands of Halmahera, Seram (formerly Ceram), Buru, Banggai, and Sula. However, it is controversial whether the animals from China, Malaysia, India and the Philippines are actually Phyllium siccifolium or should be counted among other closely related species of the siccifolium species group.

== In terraristics ==
After many years of assuming that the strain from West Malaysia, listed by the Phasmid Study Group under PSG number 76, was Phyllium siccifolium, Hennemann et al. now assume that these specimens belong to Phyllium hausleithneri, which is why the Phasmid Study Group now also calls the species that. The species listed under PSG number 278, initially referred to as Phyllium spec. (Philippines), was also suspected of being Phyllium siccifolium. Since it was described as Phyllium philippinicum in 2009, Phyllium siccifolium has not been cultivated or cultivated to date.
