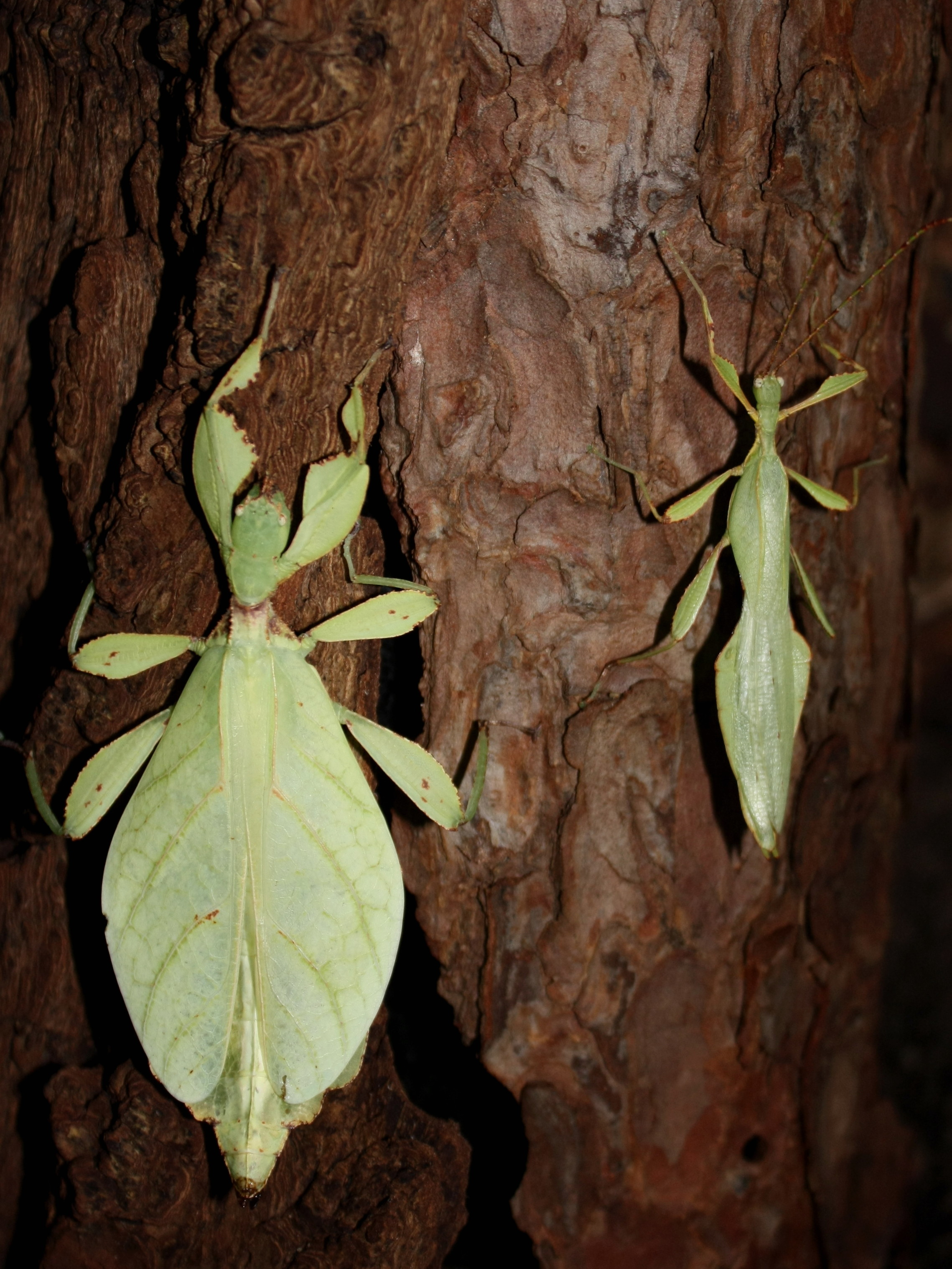
- Phyllium jacobsoni, left female, right male

Scientific classification
- Kingdom: Animalia
- Phylum: Arthropoda
- Clade: Pancrustacea
- Class: Insecta
- Order: Phasmatodea
- Suborder: Euphasmatodea
- Superfamily: Phyllioidea
- Family: Phylliidae
- Tribe: Phylliini
- Genus: Phyllium; Illiger, 1798

Type species
- Phyllium siccifolium Linnaeus, 1758

Species
- List: Phyllium antonkozlovi; Phyllium arthurchungi; Phyllium bankae; Phyllium bilobatum; Phyllium boislardi; Phyllium bonifacioi; Phyllium bourquei; Phyllium bradleri; Phyllium brossardi; Phyllium cayabyabi; Phyllium chenqiae; Phyllium conlei; Phyllium crapulatum; Phyllium cummingi; Phyllium elegans; Phyllium ericoriai; Phyllium fallorum; Phyllium gantungense; Phyllium gardabagusi; Phyllium hausleithneri; Phyllium hennemanni; Phyllium illusorium; Phyllium iyadaon; Phyllium jacobsoni; Phyllium letiranti; Phyllium mabantai; Phyllium mamasaense; Phyllium mindorense; Phyllium morganae; Phyllium nisus; Phyllium ortizi; Phyllium ouelleti; Phyllium palawanense; Phyllium philippinicum; Phyllium rubrum; Phyllium saltonae; Phyllium samarense; Phyllium siccifolium; Phyllium telnovi; Phyllium tobeloense; Phyllium woodi'

Synonyms
- Pteropus Thunberg, 1815

= Phyllium =

Genus of insects

Phyllium is a genus of stick insects belonging to the Phylliidae (leaf insects) described in 1798, and is their type genus. Despite numerous generic splits, it remains the most species-rich genus of the leaf insects. Phyllium species are found ranging from Malaysia through Indonesia and the Philippines as far as New Britain.

== Taxonomy ==
- Phyllium
  - - Phyllium palawanense
    - - Phyllium chenqiae
      - Phyllium boislardi
  - - - Phyllium gantungense
      - - Phyllium sp. 9 “Kota Belud”
        - - Phyllium cummingi
          - - Phyllium arthurchungi
            - Phyllium cayabyabi
    - - Phyllium elegans
      - - - Phyllium sp. 10 “Panay”
          - - - - Phyllium sp. 1 “Mt. Polis”
                - Phyllium sp. 6 “Mt. Pullol”
              - - - Phyllium bonifacioi
                  - Phyllium ericoriai 1
                - - Phyllium ericoriai 2
                  - Phyllium ericoriai 3
            - - Phyllium siccifolium
              - - Phyllium letiranti
                - - Phyllium hennemanni
                  - Phyllium mamasaense
        - - - Phyllium bradleri
            - - Phyllium mindorense
              - - Phyllium mabantai 2
                - Phyllium mabantai 1
              - - Phyllium crapulatum
                - - Phyllium sp. 5 “Mt. Bawang”
                  - Phyllium rubrum
          - - Phyllium sp. 7 “Dinagat Islands”
            - - - Phyllium antonkozlovi
                - Phyllium brossardi
              - - - Phyllium bankae
                  - Phyllium tobeloense
                - - - - Phyllium cf. telnovi
                      - Phyllium morganae
                    - - Phyllium gardabagusi
                      - - - Phyllium hausleithneri
                          - Phyllium nisus
                        - - Phyllium jacobsoni
                          - Phyllium illusorium
                  - - - Phyllium fallorum
                      - - Phyllium samarense
                        - Phyllium ortizi
                    - - Phyllium iyadaon
                      - - Phyllium bourquei
                        - Phyllium philippinicum

Relationships of the Phyllium species examined so far by genetic analysis according to Bank et al. (2021) and Cumming et al. (2025)

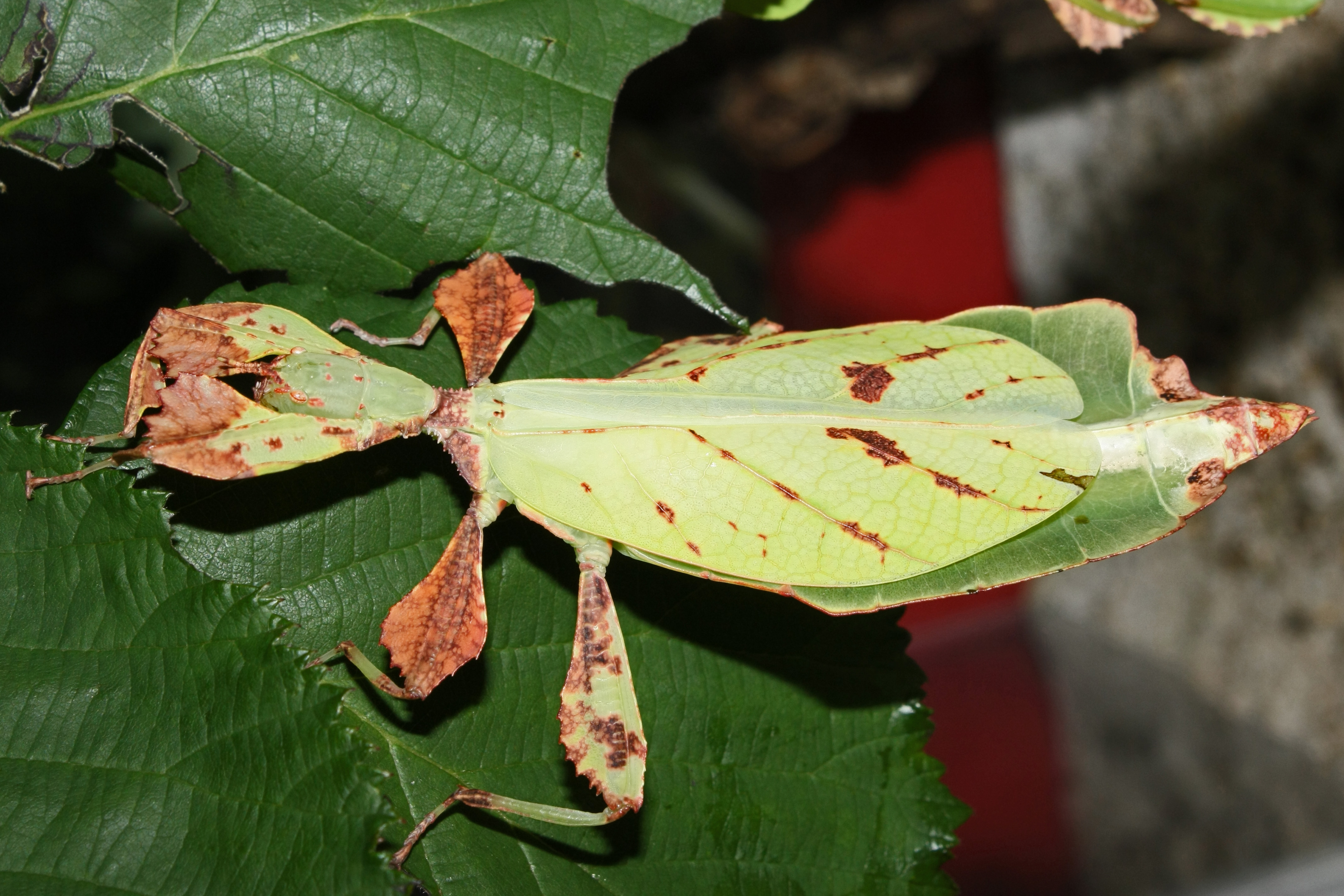
Phyllium mabantai, female

=== History of the genus ===
Among the first three species of stick and leaf insects scientifically described by Carl Linnaeus in 1758 in the 10th edition of Systema Naturae, there was in Gryllus (Mantis) siccifolius also a leaf insect. In 1798, Johann Karl Wilhelm Illiger established the genus Phyllium specifically for this species; Phyllium siccifolium became - and remains to this day - its type species by monotypy. In 1815, Carl Peter Thunberg - believing the species was still classified under the genus Mantis - transferred it, as Pteropus siccifolius, into the genus Pteropus, which he had erected solely for this purpose. However, since the species had been classified under Phyllium since 1798, William Forsell Kirby assigned this generic name as a synonym to Phyllium in 1890. Furthermore, this name had already been assigned previously to a genus of Megabat (Pteropus Erxleben, 1777); consequently, under the International Rules of Zoological Nomenclature, it was no longer available for the description of other genera. Thus, while Pteropus is indeed a valid genus of fruit bats, in the context of leaf insects, it is to be regarded as a synonym of the genus Phyllium.

While Phyllium siccifolium has been described under various names - now treated as synonyms - since 1796, the first species still considered valid today were not described until 1832, 1838, and 1843. Three of these species were placed in the subgenus Pulchriphyllium in 1898 - a subgenus that Achille Griffini established specifically for them within the genus Phyllium. In the decades that followed, almost all representatives of the leaf insects were described within the genus Phyllium, with their classification into the subgenera Phyllium and Pulchriphyllium being more or less clear-cut. Only the type species of Nanophyllium and the few representatives of the genus Chitoniscus - along with the modern genus Trolicaphyllium - were recognized relatively early on as not belonging to Phyllium.

In 2009, Frank H. Hennemann et al. proposed classifying the genus Phyllium - along with its subgenera at the time - into distinct species groups. In the years that followed, various genera emerged from these proposed groups, having been split off from Phyllium. In 2021, the Bioculatum species group and thus a portion of the former subgenus Pulchriphyllium, was elevated to the rank of genus under the name Pulchriphyllium. All representatives of the Celebicum species group - with the exception of Phyllium ericoriai, which remained within Phyllium - were transferred to the genus Cryptophyllium, established in 2021. In 2022, the genus Rakaphyllium was established for the three representatives of the Schultzei species group. Of the six species within the subgenus Pulchriphyllium that had been assigned to the Frondosum species group, five were identified as representatives of Nanophyllium as early as 2020; the remaining species - Vaabonbonphyllium groesseri - subsequently became the type species of the genus Vaabonbonphyllium, described in 2022. The only species of the Brevipenne species group was also transferred to Nanophyllium in 2021, before becoming the type species of the newly described genus Acentetaphyllium in 2022. The final and most species-rich group - the Siccifolium species group - comprised not only the core species (twelve Phyllium species at the time, which remained within the genus Phyllium) but also representatives of four additional genera described after 2009. One species was designated as the type species and transferred to the subgenus Comptaphyllium (described in 2019), while two others were transferred to the subgenus Walaphyllium (described in 2020). In 2021, both of these subgenera were elevated to the status of independent genera. Pseudomicrophyllium geryon, originally described in 1843 in the genus Phyllium, was recognized in 2021 - based on molecular genetic studies - as a member of the genus Pseudomicrophyllium, which had itself been described in 2017. Among the species of the Siccifolium species group, Cryptophyllium drunganum represented a Cryptophyllium species that was not assigned to the Celebicum species group. (see also Cladogram of the Phylliidae).

=== Etymology ===
The name "Phyllium" means "leaf". It is the Latinized form of the Greek φυλλον, -ου (phyllon, -oy)), and is neuter.

=== Internal taxomomy - species ===
The genus Phyllium currently comprises the following 41 species, one of which includes two subspecies:Phasm

- Phyllium antonkozlovi Cumming, 2017 - Philippines: Luzon
- Phyllium arthurchungi Seow-Choen, 2016 - Malaysia: Sabah
- Phyllium bankae Cumming, Foley & Le Tirant, 2025 - Indonesia: Halmahera
- Phyllium bilobatum Gray, G.R., 1843 - Philippines
- Phyllium boislardi Cumming, Foley, Hennemann, Le Tirant & Büscher, 2025 - Indonesia: northern Kalimantan
- Phyllium bonifacioi Lit & Eusebio, 2014 - Philippines: Luzon
- Phyllium bourquei Cumming & Le Tirant, 2017 - Philippines: Luzon
- Phyllium bradleri Seow-Choen, 2017 - Malaysia: Sabah
- Phyllium brossardi Cumming, Le Tirant & Teemsma, 2017 - Malaysia: Sabah
- Phyllium cayabyabi Cumming, Foley, Hennemann, Le Tirant & Büscher, 2025 - Indonesia: northern Kalimantan
- Phyllium chenqiae Seow-Choen, 2017 - Malaysia: Sabah
- Phyllium conlei Cumming, Valero & Teemsma, 2018 - Indonesia: Lombok
- Phyllium crapulatum Cumming, Foley, Le Tirant & Büscher, 2025 - Indonesia: western Kalimantan
- Phyllium cummingi Seow-Choen, 2017 - Malaysia: Sabah
- Phyllium elegans Grösser, 1991 - Papua New Guinea: New Britain
- Phyllium ericoriai Hennemann, Conle, Gottardo & Bresseel, 2009 - Philippines: Batan, Luzon, Marinduque, Catanduanes, Sibuyan
- Phyllium fallorum Cumming, 2017 - Philippines: Mindanao
- Phyllium gantungense Hennemann, Conle, Gottardo & Bresseel, 2009- Philippines: Palawan
- Phyllium gardabagusi Cumming, Bank, Le Tirant & Bradler, 2020- Indonesia: Java
- Phyllium hausleithneri Brock, 1999 - Peninsular Malaysia
- Phyllium hennemanni Cumming, Foley, Le Tirant & Büscher, 2025 - Indonesia: Sulawesi
- Phyllium illusorium Cumming, Foley, Hennemann, Le Tirant & Büscher, 2025 - Indonesia: Buton
- Phyllium iyadaon Cumming, Le Tirant, Linde, Solan, Foley, Eulin, Lavado, Whiting, Bradler & Bank, 2023 - Philippines: Mindoro
- Phyllium jacobsoni Rehn, J.A.G. & Rehn, J.W.H., 1934 - Indonesia: Java
- Phyllium letiranti Cumming & Teemsma 2018 - Indonesia: Peleng, Taliabu, Sanana
- Phyllium mabantai Bresseel, Hennemann, Conle & Gottardo, 2009 - Philippines: Mindanao
- Phyllium mamasaense Grösser, 2008 - Indonesia: Sulawesi
- Phyllium mindorense Hennemann, Conle, Gottardo & Bresseel, 2009 - Philippines: Mindoro
- Phyllium morganae Cumming, Foley, Hennemann, Le Tirant & Büscher, 2025 - Indonesia: Yapen
- Phyllium nisus Cumming, Bank, Le Tirant & Bradler, 2020 - Indonesia: Sumatra
- Phyllium ortizi Cumming, Le Tirant, Linde, Solan, Foley, Eulin, Lavado, Whiting, Bradler & Bank, 2023 - Philippines: Mindanao
- Phyllium ouelleti Cumming, Foley, Hennemann, Le Tirant & Büscher, 2025 - Indonesia: Obi
- Phyllium palawanense Grösser, 2001 - Philippines: Palawan
- Phyllium philippinicum Hennemann, Conle, Gottardo & Bresseel, 2009 - Philippines: Luzon
- Phyllium rubrum Cumming, Le Tirant & Teemsma, 2018 - Peninsular Malaysia
- Phyllium saltonae Cumming, Baker, Le Tirant & Marshall, 2020 - Philippines: Palawan
- Phyllium samarense Cumming, Le Tirant, Linde, Solan, Foley, Eulin, Lavado, Whiting, Bradler & Bank, 2023 - Philippines: Samar
- Phyllium siccifolium (Linnaeus, 1758) - type species (as Gryllus siccifolius Linnnaeus, 1758, type locality: India) - Indonesia: Buru, Ambon, Seram
- Phyllium telnovi Brock, 2014 - Indonesia: Western New Guinea
- Phyllium tobeloense
  - Phyllium tobeloense tobeloense Grösser, 2007 - Indonesia: Halmahera
  - Phyllium tobeloense bhaskarai Cumming, Hennemann & Le Tirant, 2019 - Indonesia: Morotai
- Phyllium woodi Rehn, J.A.G. & Rehn, J.W.H., 1934 - Philippines: Sibuyan

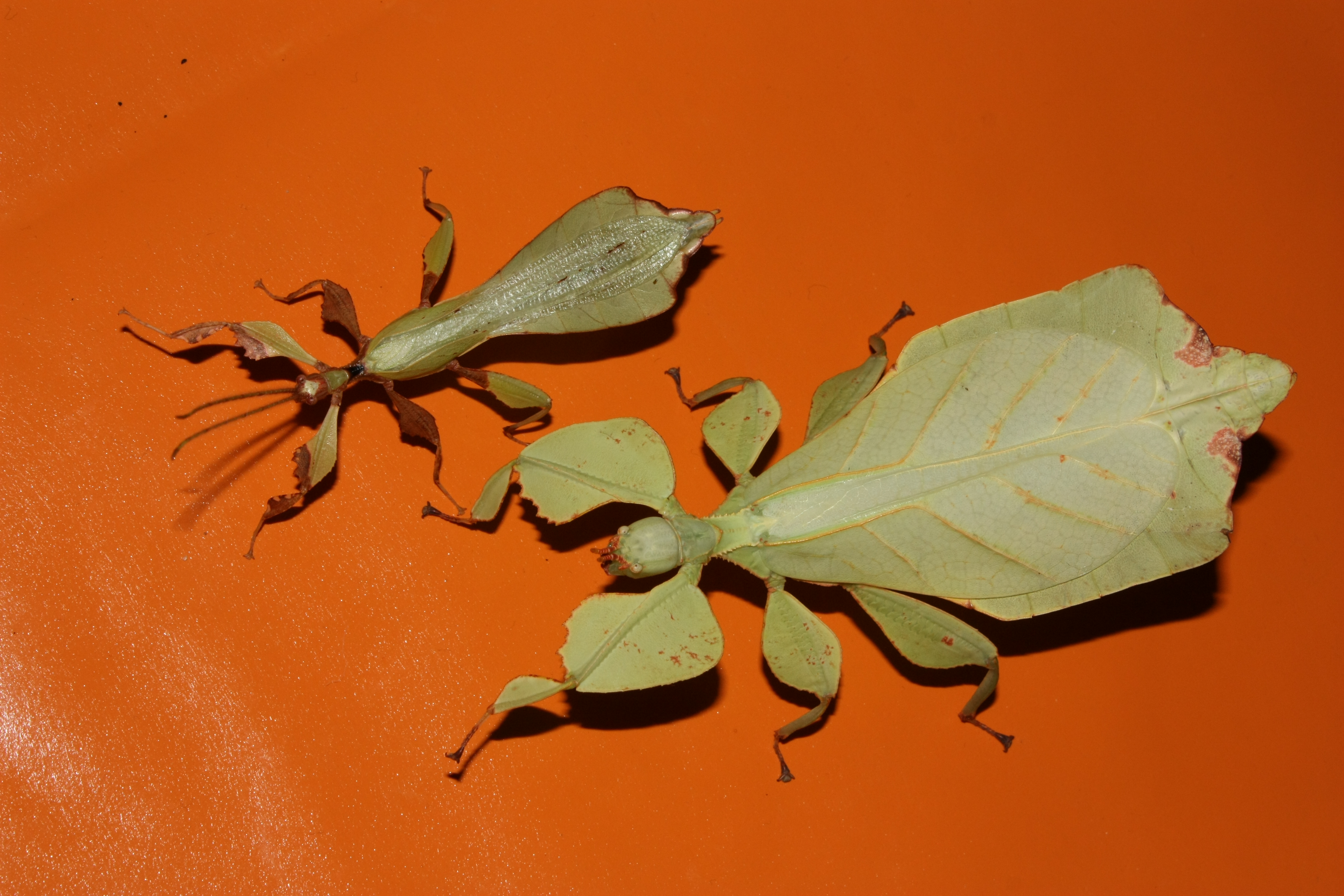
Pair of Phyllium ericoriai

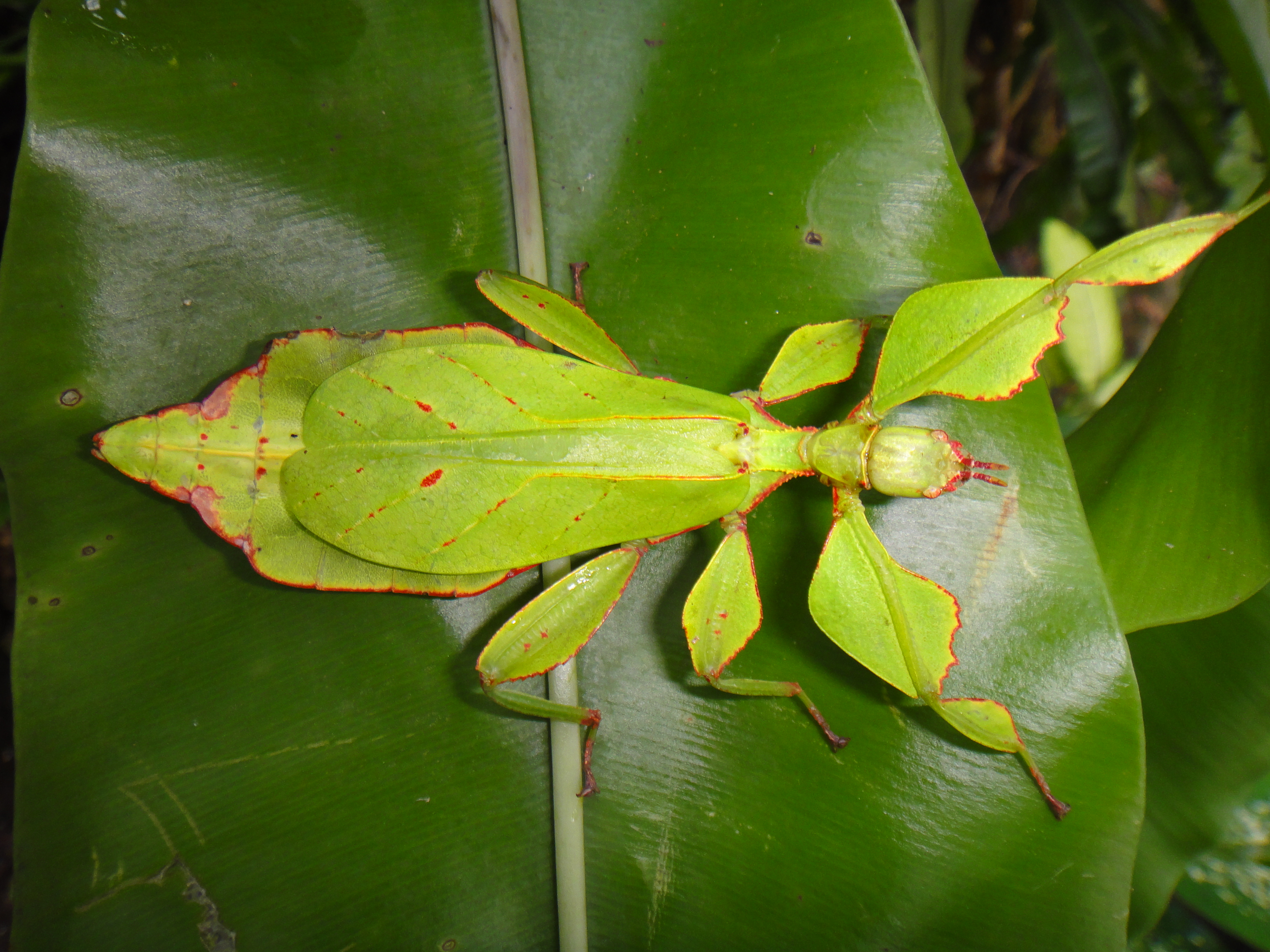
Female of Phyllium bonifacioi

In their paper on phylogeny and historical biogeography published in 2021, Sarah Bank et al. conducted molecular genetic analyses on samples of a wide variety of leaf insects. Among these were 52 samples representing the genus Phyllium. Three samples that had been morphologically assigned to Phyllium ericoriai exhibited such significant genetic differences that, in this and subsequent studies, they were distinguished as Phyllium ericoriai 1, 2, and 3. All three samples form a clade with Phyllium bonifacioi, whereby Phyllium ericoiai 1 constitutes its sister taxon, while Phyllium ericoriai 2 and 3 form a distinct sister group within this clade. There were also two genetically distinct samples of Phyllium mabantai. Ten samples could not be assigned to any known species and were listed as undescribed species, accompanied by their respective collection localities. As early as 2023, three of these species were formally described by Royce T. Cumming et al. The description of Phyllium bankae by Cumming, Evelyn Marie Foley, and Stéphane Le Tirant in 2025 added another of these species. In 2025, Cumming et al. described seven other species that had not previously been studied. None of these seven species corresponded to the six previously genetically analyzed, undescribed species identified in the 2021 study. Nevertheless, these seven species had also already been subjected to molecular genetic analysis and taxonomic classification by Bank - the senior author of both the 2023 and 2025 publications.

=== Phylogenetics within the Leaf insects ===
According to the molecular genetic studies by Bank et al., Phyllium is the sister genus to a clade comprising the genera Cryptophyllium, Pulchriphyllium, as well as Microphyllium and Pseudomicrophyllium. In 2022, Cumming and Le Tirant did not consider Pulchriphyllium to be part of this clade. A subsequent reclassification of the genus - which excluded the genera Acentetaphyllium, Rakaphyllium, and Vaabonbonphyllium, as these had not yet been subjected to molecular genetic analysis - reaffirmed that Microphyllium and Pseudomicrophyllium are the sister genera to Pulchriphyllium, and that these form a shared clade with Cryptophyllium. The genus Phyllium is included in the next higher clade (see also Cladogram of the Phylliidae).

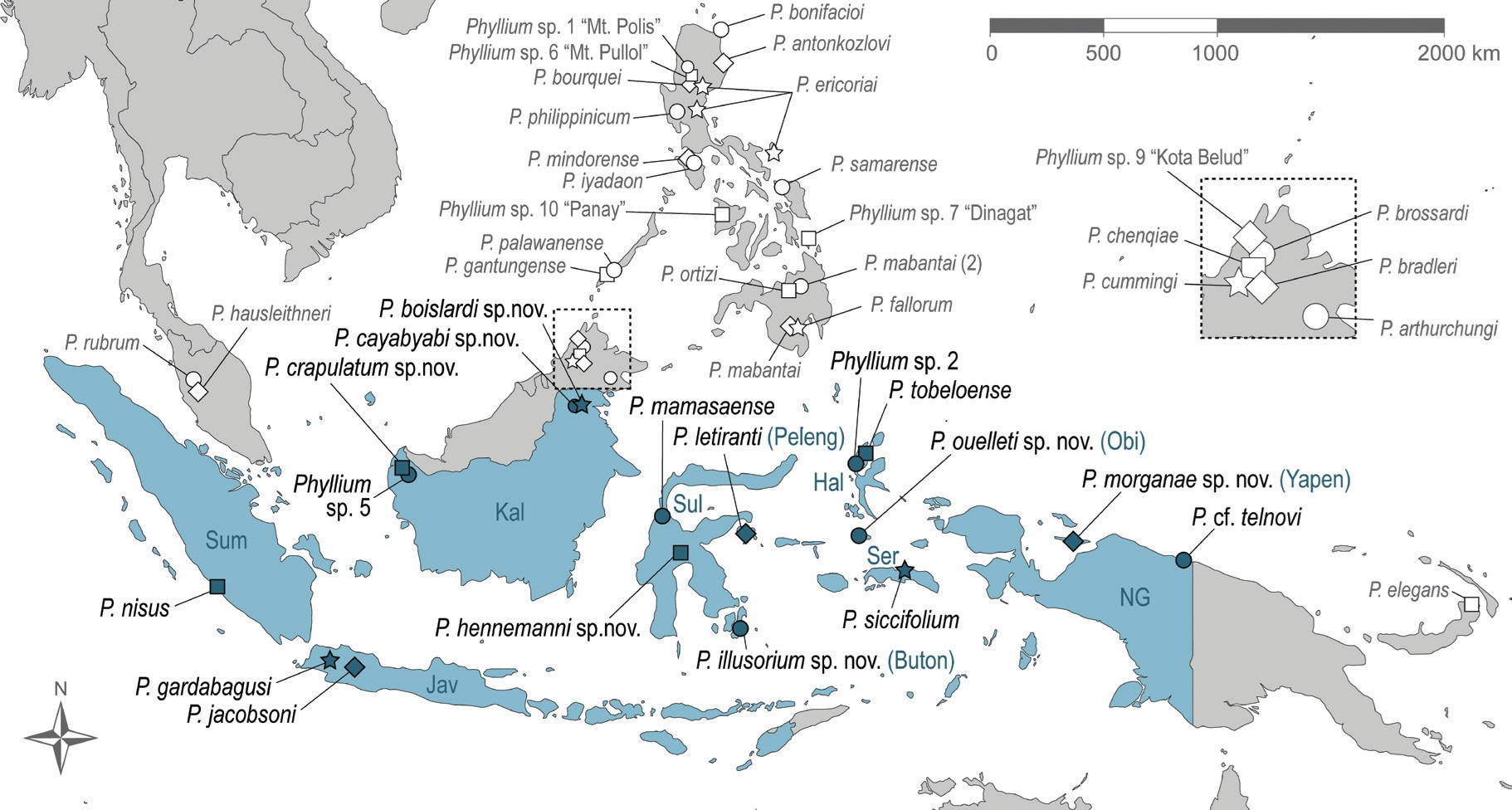
Distribution map of Phyllium species, according to Cumming et al. (2025)

== Distribution ==
The distribution range of the genus Phyllium encompasses the entire territories of Malaysia, the Philippines, and Indonesia, as well as the island of New Britain. Thus, it extends from the Malay Peninsula via Sumatra, Java, Borneo, Palawan, Sulawesi, Buton, Peleng, Halmahera, Obi, Yapen, Luzon, Mindanao, and several other Philippine islands as far as New Guinea, where one species occurs in West New Guinea near the border with Papua New Guinea. Another species is found on New Britain. With nine to ten species each, Luzon and Borneo represent the primary centers of distribution for the genus. Although India is cited by Linnaeus as the type locality for Phyllium siccifolium, it lies far outside the distribution range of the genus.

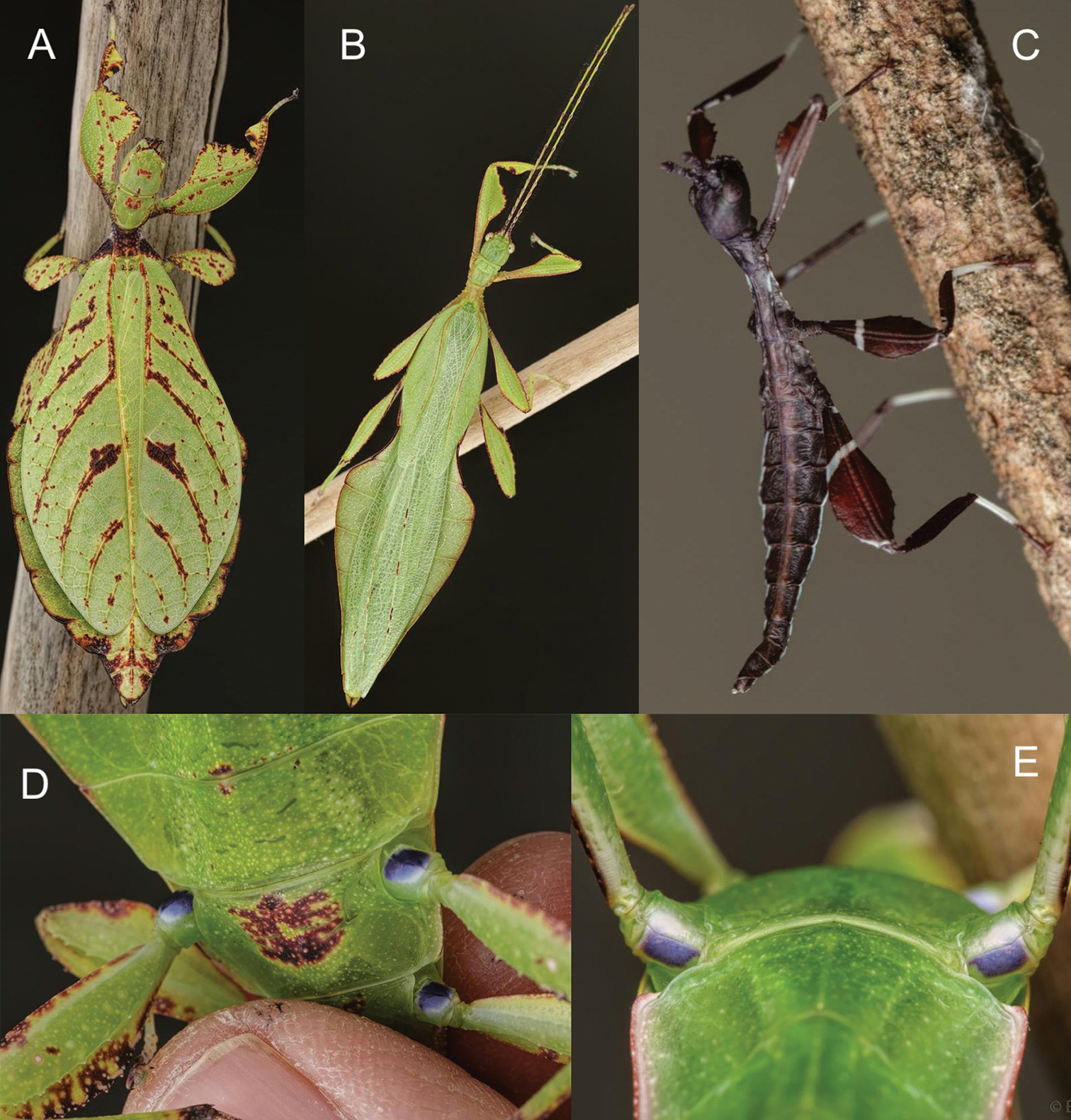
Phyllium hausleithneri, A female, B male, C freshly hatched nymph, D & E ventral view, looking at the blue coxae D in female, E in male

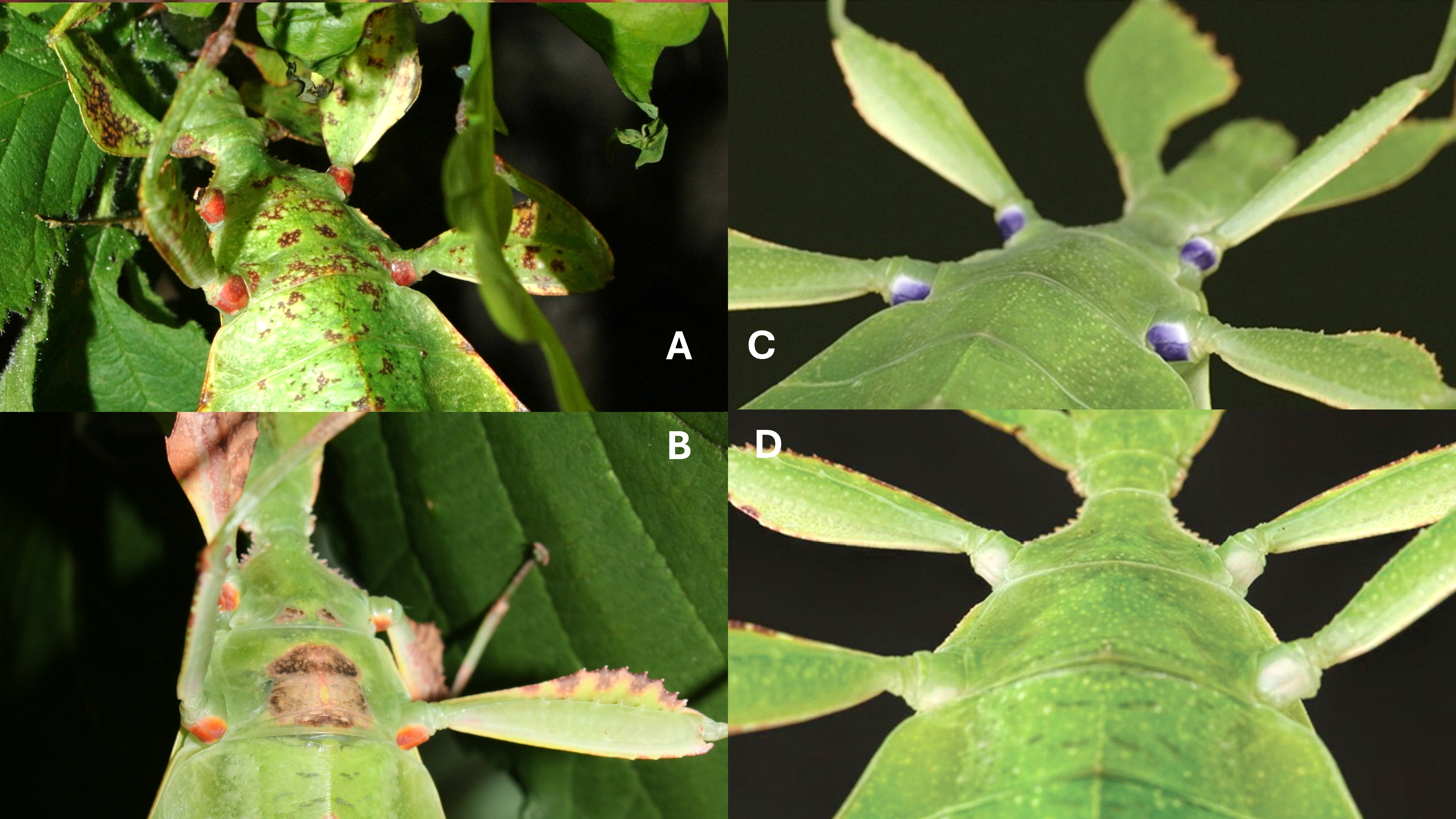
Differently colored meso and meta coxae of females of A Phyllium ericoriai, B Phyllium mabantai, C Phyllium gardabagusi, D Phyllium jacobsoni

== Description ==
Representatives of the genus Phyllium - much like those of the closely related genus Cryptophyllium - have well-developed lobes on the tibiae of their forelegs exclusively on the inner side (protibial interior lobes). These lobes are absent from the outer side of the fore tibiae in both genera. In contrast, Pulchriphyllium species possess well-developed inner and outer lobes on the tibiae of their forelegs (protibial interior and exterior lobes). On the tibiae of the mid- and hind legs, Phyllium species typically lack both inner and outer lobes. The femora of the fore, mid, and hind legs almost invariably exhibit well-developed inner and outer lobes (femoral interior and exterior lobes). Only the outer lobes of the hind femora (metafemoral exterior lobes) may be reduced in both sexes. Additionally, the outer lobes of the fore femora (profemoral exterior lobes) are strongly reduced or entirely absent in some males. The inner lobes of the fore femora (profemoral interior lobes) bear a variable number of teeth along their margins, arranged in a species-specific pattern.

Among the characteristics often relevant for species identification is the coloration of the coxae of the middle and hind legs. This coloration is usually identical in both sexes. While many species possess light to reddish-brown coxae, there are also those with orange to red (Phyllium arthurchungi and Phyllium rubrum), black (Phyllium gantungense), or white coxae (Phyllium jacobsoni and Phyllium elegans). The very similar species Phyllium hausleithneri, Phyllium nisus, and Phyllium gardabagusi - which originate from different geographic regions - have blue to purple coxae. Their blue coloration is invariably darker than the sky-blue hue observed on the coxae of female Chitoniscus species. The adult females of both subspecies of Phyllium tobeloense have yellow-colored middle and hind coxae; a single additional black spot is present only on the coxae of the hind legs. Phyllium mamasaense exhibits a black spot on both the middle and hind coxae. Similar spots, albeit somewhat less distinct, can also be found on the coxae of Phyllium siccifolium.

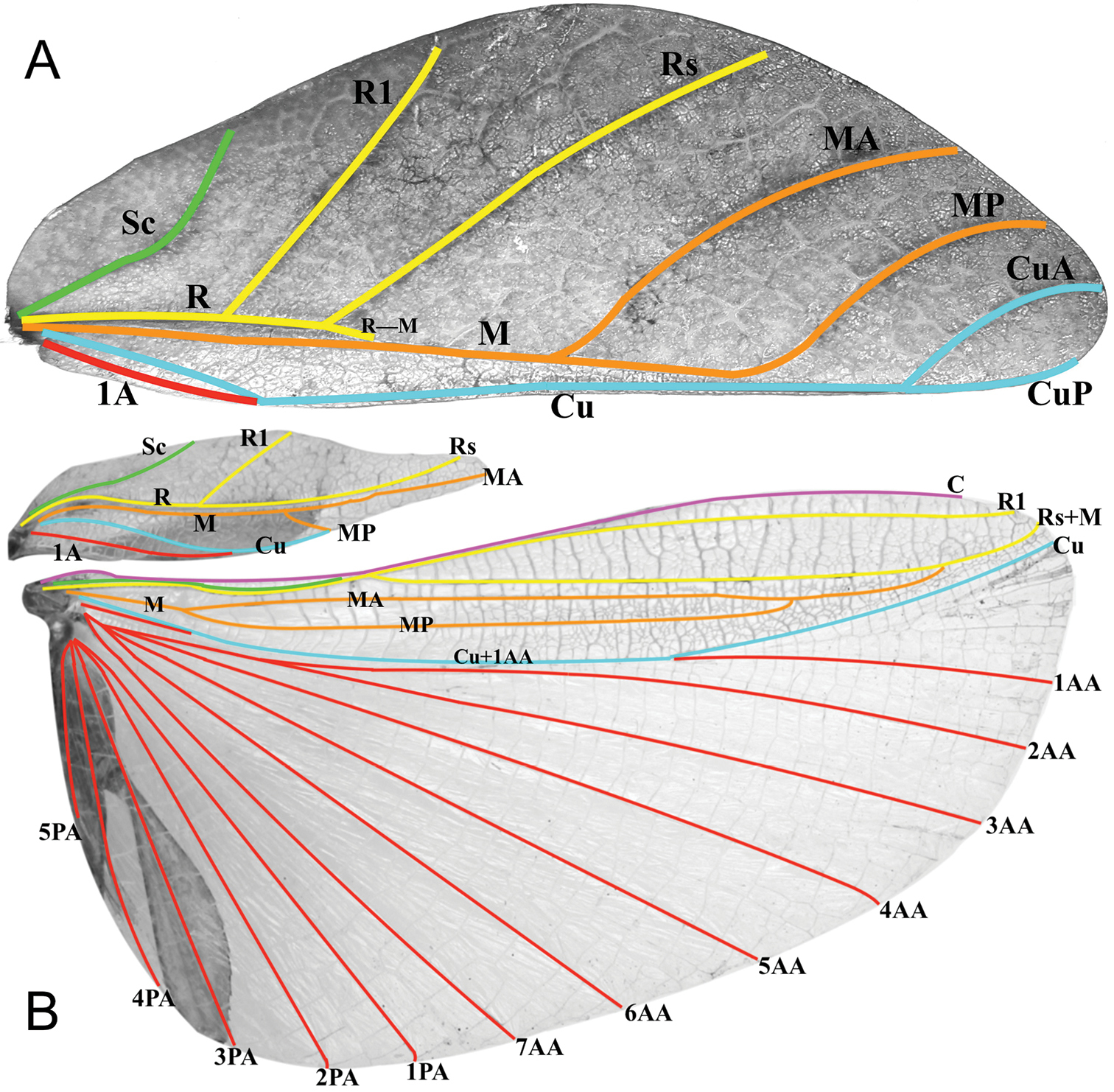
Venation of A forewing of a female of Phyllium nisus and B fore and hindwing of a male of Phyllium hausleithneri

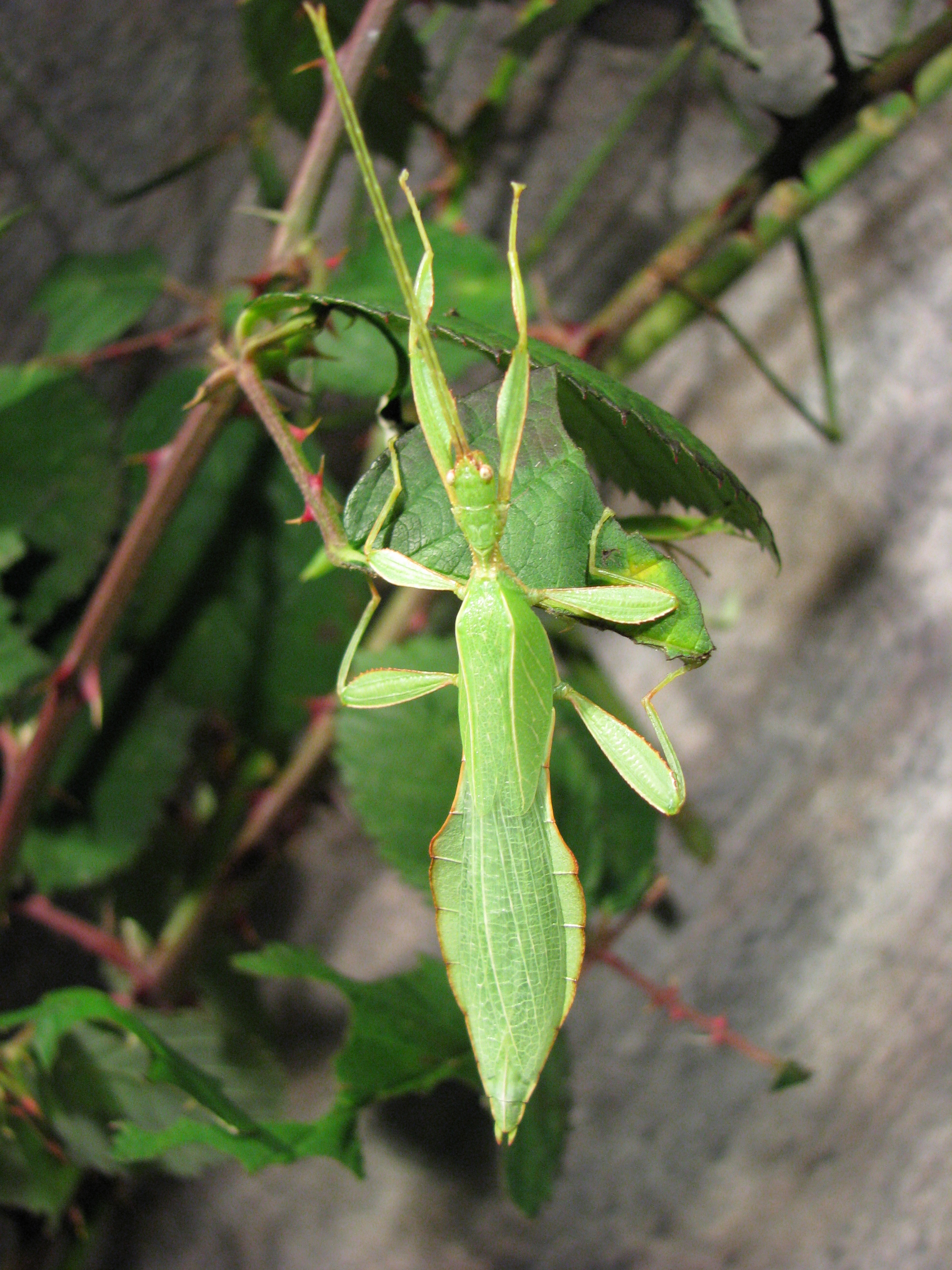
Phyllium philippinicum, male

=== Females ===
Females of smaller species - such as Phyllium fallorum (whose males are still unknown), Phyllium jacobsoni, or Phyllium ortizi - reach body lengths between 63.5 millimetres (2.50 in) and 76.4 millimetres (3.01 in). Those of the largest species, Phyllium bonifacioi and Phyllium tobeloense, reach body lengths of around 100 millimetres (3.9 in). Females of most species are 75 to 90 millimetres (3.0 to 3.5 in) long. Most morphological characteristics found in Phyllium females are also present in the females of Cryptophyllium species. A distinguishing feature exists only in the antennae, which in both groups consist of nine to ten segments. While in Phyllium females the fourth antennal segment is as long as it is wide, in Cryptophyllium females it is invariably short, disc-shaped, and at least three times wider than it is long. It is significantly shorter than each of the three subsequent segments. In Phyllium females, this segment is of similar length to each of the three subsequent segments and is sometimes slightly stalked at its base. The third antennal segment typically features a stridulatory ridge (Pars stridens) with a more or less species-specific number of small teeth. Rubbing these antennal segments against each other produces stridulation, which serves to deter enemies (predators) or attract males. The forewings - which in all leaf insects are developed as tegmina - are invariably long in Phyllium females. Their venation is almost identical to that of Cryptophyllium females. It consists of an undivided subcostal vein (Sc), a radial vein (R) that divides into the first radial vein (R1) and the radial sector (Rs), and terminates in a small radial-medial cross-vein (R-M). The median vein (M) is forked in its posterior half, whereas the cubitus vein (Cu) splits into the anterior cubitus (CuA) and the posterior cubitus (CuP) only quite near its distal end. The first anal vein (1A) fuses early on with the cubitus. In almost all Phyllium females, the hind wings (alae) are completely reduced. While hind wings are almost invariably present in Cryptophyllium females - ranging in length from half to nearly the full length of the tegmina (forewings), with only a few known species such as Cryptophyllium icarus in which they do not reach the second abdominal segment - the situation is reversed in Phyllium females. Their hind wings are almost always absent and are fully developed only in exceptional cases, such as in species like Phyllium ericoriai or the closely related Phyllium bonifacioi.

=== Males ===
Among the smallest known males are those of Phyllium illusorium and Phyllium conlei. In the case of the latter, the females remain unknown to date. They reach body lengths of 46.8 to 49.0 millimetres (1.84 to 1.93 in). Males of Phyllium jacobsoni grow to between 42.5 to 56.5 millimetres (1.67 to 2.22 in) in length. The largest known males reach a length of only 66 to 68 millimetres (2.6 to 2.7 in). These include Phyllium tobeloense and Phyllium arthurchungi, as well as Phyllium cummingi, whose females are not yet known. The males of most species grow to between 50 to 65 millimetres (2.0 to 2.6 in) in length. Phyllium males typically hold their antennae directed forward, whereas males of the genera Pulchriphyllium and Cryptophyllium orient their antennae backward when at rest. Furthermore, Phyllium males differ from Cryptophyllium species by their vomer, which has only a single apical hook. Cryptophyllium species invariably possess two apical hooks at the tip of the vomer. The vomer - is a movable sclerite located on the tenth sternums of the male abdomen, which serves to anchor the male to the seventh sternum of the female's abdomen during mating - also bears only a single hook in all other Phylliidae. The length of the male tegmina varies slightly. Their venation resembles that of Cryptophyllium. The cubitus (Cu) is likewise unbranched. The median vein is divided solely into an anterior (Media anterior = MA) and a posterior portion (Media posterior = MP). Unlike in the tegmina of Cryptophyllium males, its posterior portion is not split into two parts. The alae of Phyllium males are invariably long and fully developed. Along the anterior margin, they possess a Costa (C) and a Subcosta (Sc). Following these is a Radius vein (R), which divides into a first Radius (R1) and a Radial Sector (Rs), both of which reunite at the wing margin. The Subcosta (Sc) typically terminates at the level where the first Radius (R1) and the Radial Sector (Rs) diverge. The Median vein (M) initially divides into an anterior (MA) and a posterior portion (MP); subsequently, both portions reunite, then fuse with the Radial Sector (Rs), and run together to the wing margin. The Cubitus vein (Cu) runs fused with the first anterior Anal vein (1AA) before the two diverge toward the wing margin. In total, there are seven anterior Anal veins and at least five posterior Anal veins.

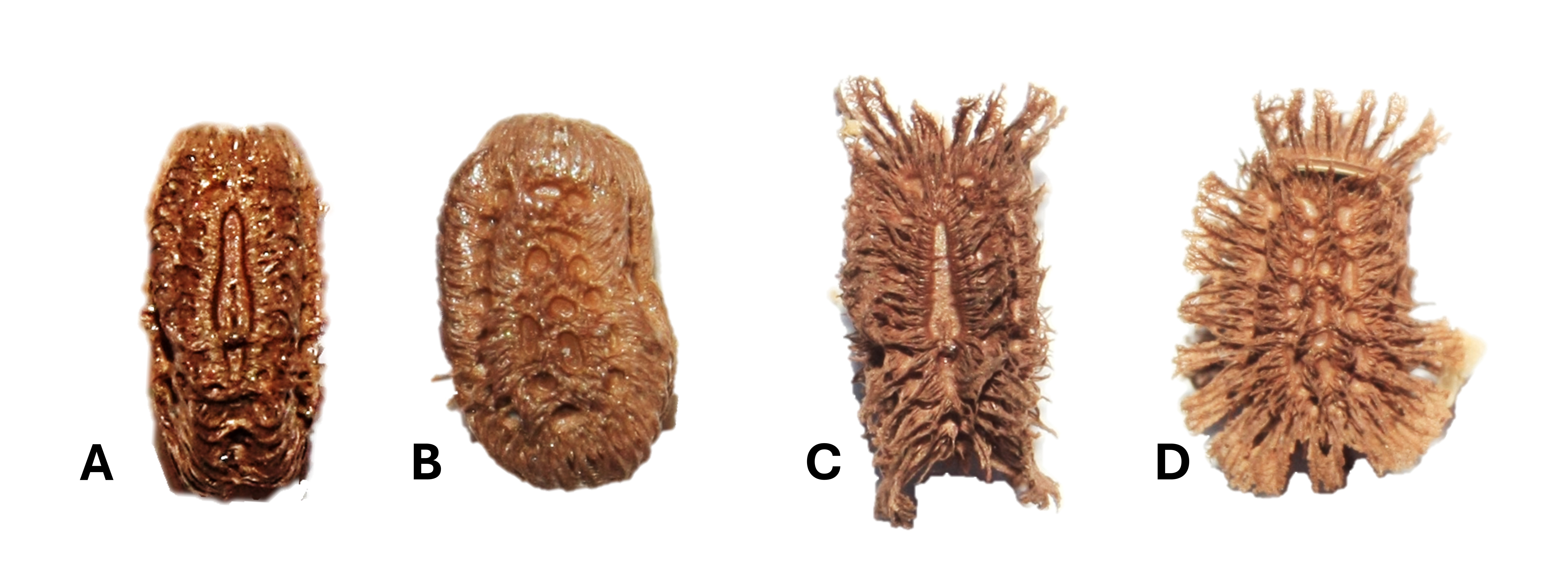
Phyllium mabantai, A & B eggs with unexpanded pinnae, C & D Eggs with fully opened pinnae; A & C dorsal view; B & D sagittal view

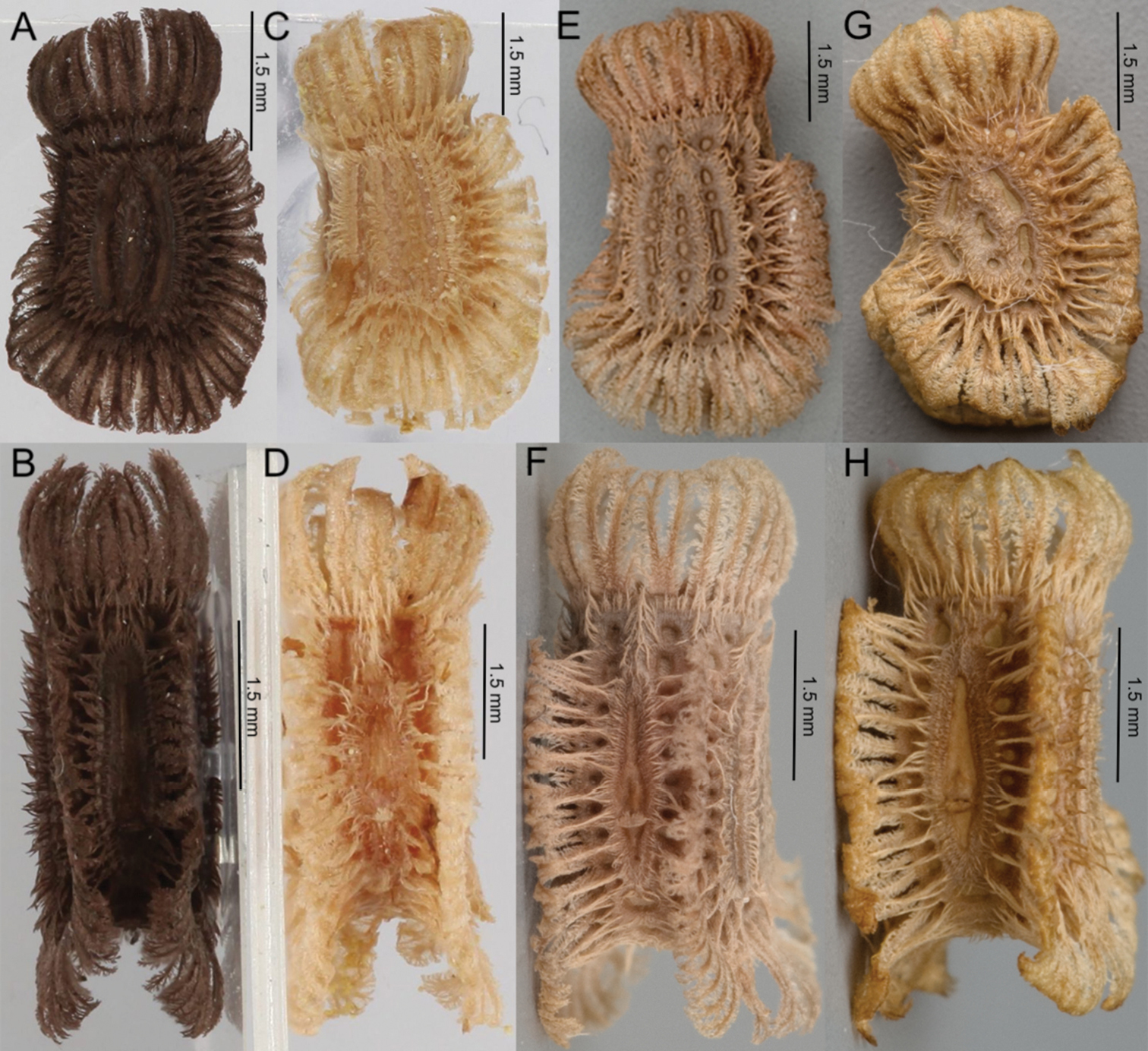
Eggs of A & B Phyllium hausleithneri, C & D Phyllium nisus, E & F Phyllium gardabagusi, G & H Phyllium jacobsoni

=== Eggs ===
A characteristic feature of the eggs of Phyllium species is the presence of so-called pinnae (derived from Latin for "fin" or "wing"). Pinnae are also found on the eggs of Cryptophyllium species, though in that case, they appear as short, moss-like appendages distributed across the entire capsule. The pinnae of Phyllium species, by contrast, are typically long appendages that may be hair-like, feather-like, or even bristle- or brush-shaped. While such long pinnae are also present on the currently known eggs of Comptaphyllium species, they are never arranged circularly around the lid (operculum) as they are in Phyllium; instead, they are found solely along the lateral edge of the lid. The pinnae of Phyllium eggs are not visible at the time of oviposition; they only unfurl upon contact with moisture or when exposed to sufficiently humid ambient air. The most well-known and likely most common-morphotype of Phyllium egg appears rectangular in cross-section. In this configuration, the longer sides of the rectangle correspond to the flattened lateral surfaces of the egg. In lateral view, the egg exhibits a slight dorsal convexity, giving it a gentle curvature. The capsule is narrowest at its anterior end-specifically, at the operculum. Its width increases slightly toward the posterior pole. In lateral view, the dorsal and posterior margins feature long, feather-like pinnae extending along their entire length. These pinnae are absent from the anterior ventral margin. Moving posteriorly, one first encounters shorter pinnae that gradually increase in length. Along the rim of the lid, there are also very long pinnae that curve inward toward the center of the lid. The lateral surfaces of the egg capsule feature species-specific depressions, pits, or slits. Eggs of this type are found in Phyllium gardabagusi and all species belonging to the same clade, as well as in species within the clade of Phyllium mindorense, and also in other species such as Phyllium philippinicum. Additionally, there are eggs featuring entirely oval lateral surfaces (e.g., in Phyllium saltonae), which are densely covered over their entire surface with very long pinnae that completely and almost circularly encircle the lateral faces (e.g., in Phyllium palawanense). Furthermore, eggs exhibiting these characteristics are known to be so strongly laterally compressed that their dorsal side is very narrow, while the ventral side tapers to a point. Thus, in cross-section, they form an isosceles triangle with a very small base (e.g., in Phyllium boislardi). Eggs that are oval in cross-section—with almost completely reduced dorsal and ventral sides, and lateral faces that are approximately rectangular with a central convex expansion — also occur, for instance, in Phyllium hennemanni. In the eggs of this species - much like those of Phyllium elegans - the pinnae are comparatively short and are found only along the lateral margins or edges. The pinnae may also be highly reduced, as seen in Phyllium gantungense, where they appear in a total of only ten clusters: at each of the four corners of the operculum and the posterior pole, as well as in the middle of the two dorsal edges (i.e., adjacent to the micropylar plate). In many species, the eggs are light brown in color, though they may also be beige or black. A unique phenomenon is observed in Phyllium ericoriai, in which some females lay only beige or almost white eggs, while others lay exclusively almost black eggs.

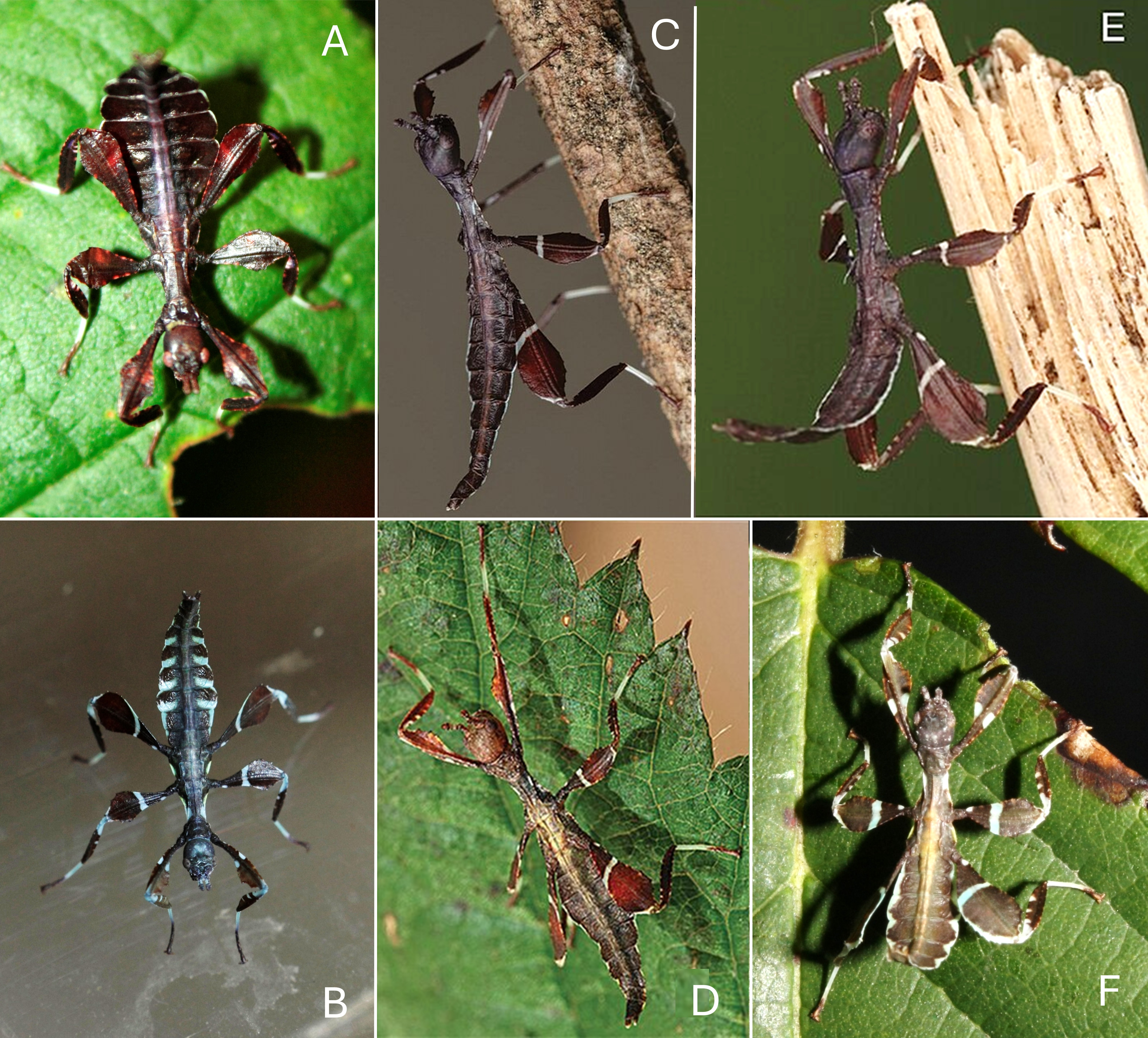
Freshly hatched nymphs of A Phyllium ericoriai, B Phyllium mabantai, C Phyllium hausleithneri, D Phyllium jacobsoni, E Phyllium gardabagusi, F Phyllium philippinicum

=== Freshly hatched nymphs ===
Newly hatched nymphs possess a matte, reddish-brown to black ground color. In most species, the central region of the abdomen is bordered in white to light green. In some species (e.g., Phyllium ortizi, Phyllium mabantai, and Phyllium samarense), similarly colored spots extend from this border onto the anterior portions of abdominal segments two through seven. Like the newly hatched nymphs of Cryptophyllium, they almost invariably exhibit partial or complete white bands on the femoral lobes of their middle and hind legs, and in some cases, on the lobes of the forelegs as well. Additionally, the proximal ends of the tibiae on the fore, middle, and hind legs almost always begin with a white coloration that contrasts sharply with the dark ground color. In nearly all species, the first and elongated tarsal segment of all six legs is also entirely white (or, less frequently, light green), whereas in Cryptophyllium hatchlings, this segment typically reverts to the ground color at its distal end. In Phyllium elegans, the basal portions of the first tarsal segments are indeed white; however, from the midpoint distally, they transition to a yellow or orange-brown hue. The hatchlings of Phyllium ericoriai constitute an exception regarding several characteristics. Their abdomen is broader than that of other known Phyllium hatchlings and displays only a faint suggestion of a white border. Furthermore, their ground color is a glossy black-brown rather than matte. Instead of white bands on the femoral lobes, only reddish-brown to orange patches are present. The proximal ends of the tibiae are likewise devoid of white coloration, although the first tarsal segment of every foot is once again colored white, typical of the genus.

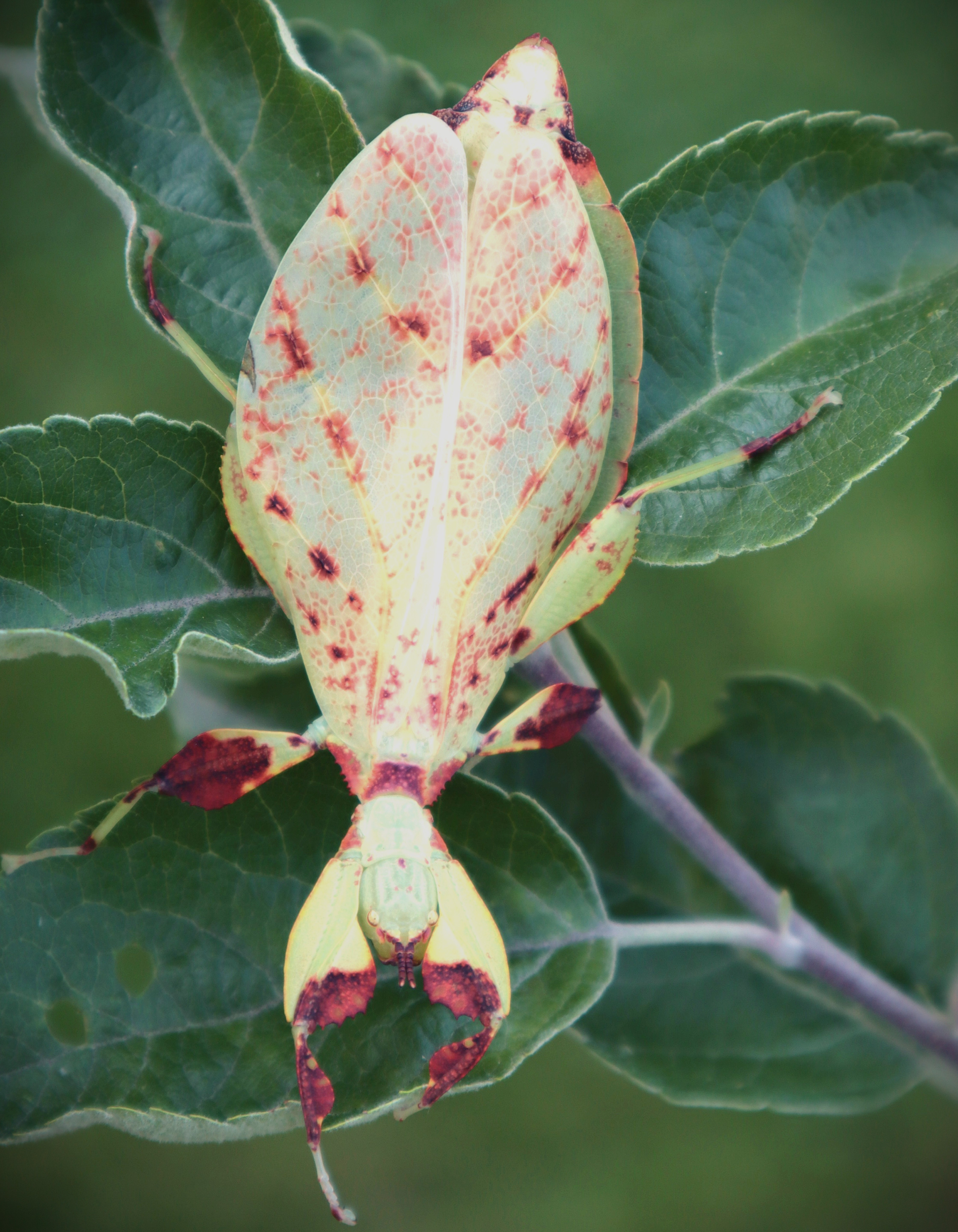
Phyllium elegans “Nanga Nanga“, female

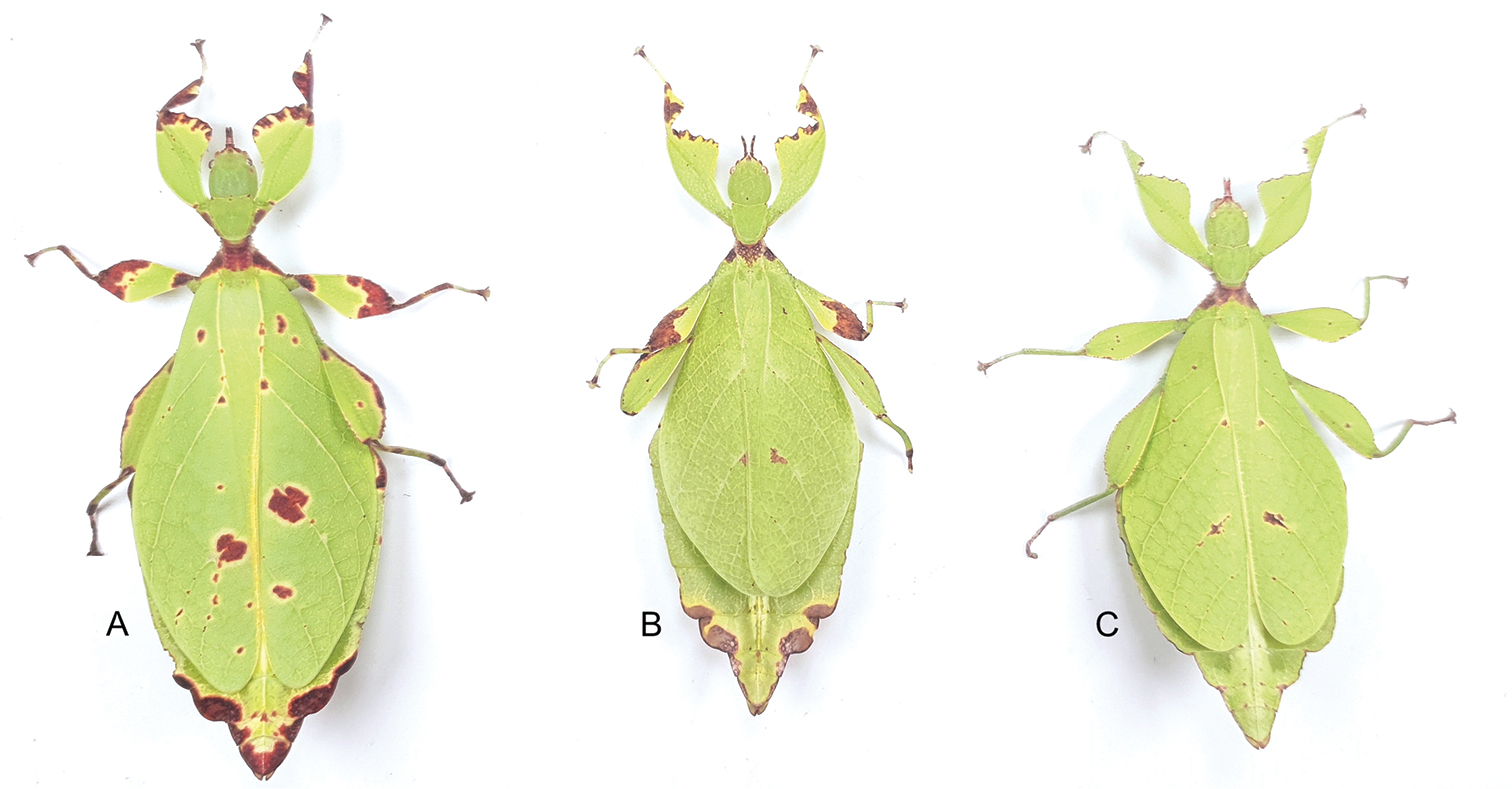
Females of A Phyllium hausleithneri “Tapah Hills”, B Phyllium nisus “Bukit Daun”, C Phyllium gardabagusi “Argopuro”

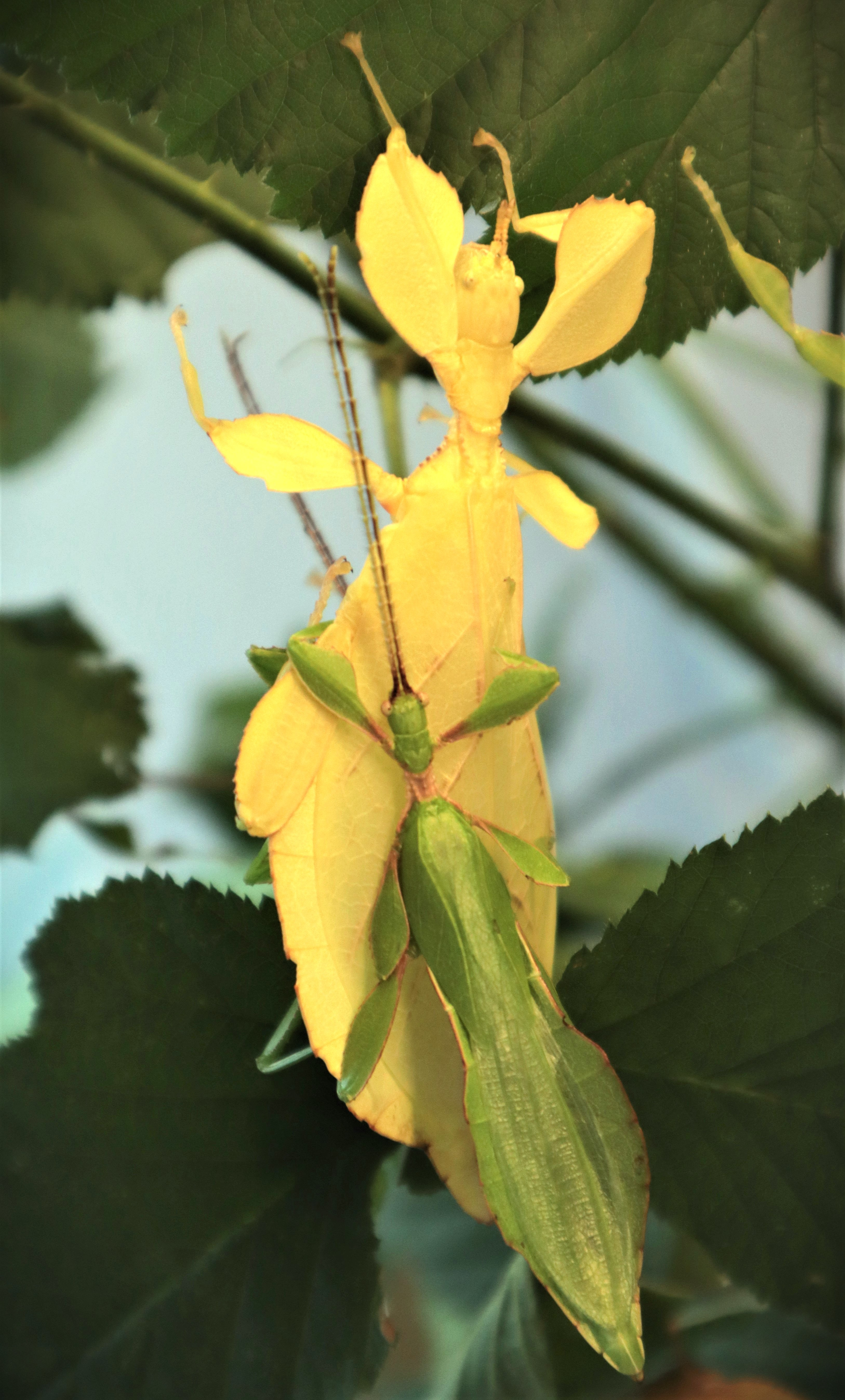
Phyllium letiranti “Tataba“, pair

== Terraristics ==
Representatives of the species currently remaining within the genus Phyllium have been bred in Europe since approximately the mid-1970s. Including those species described and introduced over the last few decades, at least 15 breeding stocks are - or have been - in culture, which can in turn be assigned to at least 13 distinct species.

Under PSG number 76, the Phasmid Study Group maintains a stock from West Malaysia - specifically the Malay Peninsula - which was initially believed to be Phyllium siccifolium. The species was described in 1999 as Phyllium hausleithneri. While the original stock is no longer in culture, additional stocks of Phyllium hausleithneri were imported in 2011 and 2016 from the Tapah hills in the Malaysian state of Perak. A species from Malaysia - which was temporarily maintained from around 2007 onwards under the names Phyllium bilobatum or Phyllium cf. bilobatum - was subsequently also assigned to the highly variable Phyllium hausleithneri, given that Phyllium bilobatum was originally described from the Philippines.

Phyllium philippinicum is listed under PSG number 278; it has been in captivity since its discovery in 2000, though it was not formally described until 2009. As the species proved to be easy to keep and breed, it quickly became the most common species of leaf insect in the terrarium hobby. The captive-bred stock originates from the municipality of Subic, located on the island of Luzon. Phyllium jacobsoni has been in captivity under PSG number 347 since 2007/2008. One stock of this species originates from Mount Halimun in western Java; another was imported in 2008 from Nongkodjadjar in East Java. Phyllium mabantai has been listed under PSG number 348 since 2008/2009. Phyllium ericoriai has been in terraristics since at least 2010. Two stocks have been established in culture: one from the type locality on Marinduque and another from Ibong Sapa on Catanduanes Island. Phyllium rubrum from the Tapah Hills was already being kept and bred by Detlef Größer in 2013 - prior to its formal description in 2018. Characterized by its red coxae, this species was previously referred to as Phyllium sp. “red coxae” or Phyllium sp. “Tapah Hills, red coxae”. A stock of Phyllium tobeloense was successfully bred and distributed for the first time in 2014 by both Bruno Kneubühler and Größer. Based on its origin in the Galela District on the island of Halmahera, it is designated as Phyllium tobeloense “Galela”. Similarly, a stock of Phyllium gantungense collected in Rizal was successfully bred and distributed in Europe for the first time by Kneubühler in 2016. Specimens collected in 2014 on Mount Argopuro in the province of East Java were designated first as Phyllium sp. “Argopuro, blue coxae” or Phyllium sp. “Argopuro, purple coxae“ . The species has been in terraristics since at least 2018 and was formally described in 2020. Since then, the resulting stock has been referred to as Phyllium gardabagusi “Argopuro.” Among the species resembling Phyllium hausleithneri, both Phyllium gardabagusi from Java and Phyllium nisus from Sumatra are currently being in culture. A stock initially known as Phyllium sp. “Bukit Daun” is based on specimens discovered in 2017 on the Bukit Daun volcano in the province of Bengkulu. These specimens - renamed Phyllium nisus “Bukit Daun” following the species' formal description in 2020 - are considered easy to keep. Since 2016, a stock of Phyllium elegans imported from the village of Nanga Nanga in East New Britain Province, has been maintained in culture. This species, which is easy to keep and highly variable in coloration, was first successfully bred by Kneubühler as a sexual breeding stock and subsequently distributed under the name Phyllium elegans “Nanga Nanga”. For some time now, however, this strain has been maintained solely through parthenogenesis. Phyllium letiranti - a species that is also easy to breed and exhibits significant color variation among females - has likewise been maintained and bred in captivity since (or immediately prior to) its formal description in 2018. This culture originates from Peleng Island and is designated Phyllium letiranti “Tataba”, named after the specific locality on the island where the specimens were collected. Since at least 2023, a stock of Phyllium bourquei from the province of Benguet on Luzon has been maintained under the designation Phyllium bourquei “Itogon”.

Accordingly, the following stocks are - or have been in the past - in culture:

- Phyllium philippinicum “Subic” (since 2000/2001)
- Phyllium hausleithneri “Tapah Hills” (since at least 2004)
- Phyllium jacobsoni
  - Phyllium jacobsoni “Halimun”
  - Phyllium jacobsoni “Nongkodjadjar” (since 2007/2008)
- Phyllium mabantai (since 2008/2009)
- Phyllium ericoriai
  - Phyllium ericoriai “Marinduque” (since at least 2010)
  - Phyllium ericoriai “Ibong Sapa”
- Phyllium rubrum “Tapah Hills” (since at least2013)
- Phyllium tobeloense “Galela“ (since 2014)
- Phyllium elegans “Nanga Nanga“ (since 2016)
- Phyllium gantungense “Rizal“ (since 2016)
- Phyllium nisus “Bukit Daun” (since 2017/2018)
- Phyllium letiranti “Tataba“ (since 2017/2018)
- Phyllium gardabagusi “Argopuro“ (since at least 2018)
- Phyllium bourquei “Itogon“ (since at least 2023)

Depending on the species and developmental stage, the following plants are suitable as food: oak, hazel, bramble, Mangifera indica (mango), Psidium guajava (guava), and Gaultheria shallon (salal).
