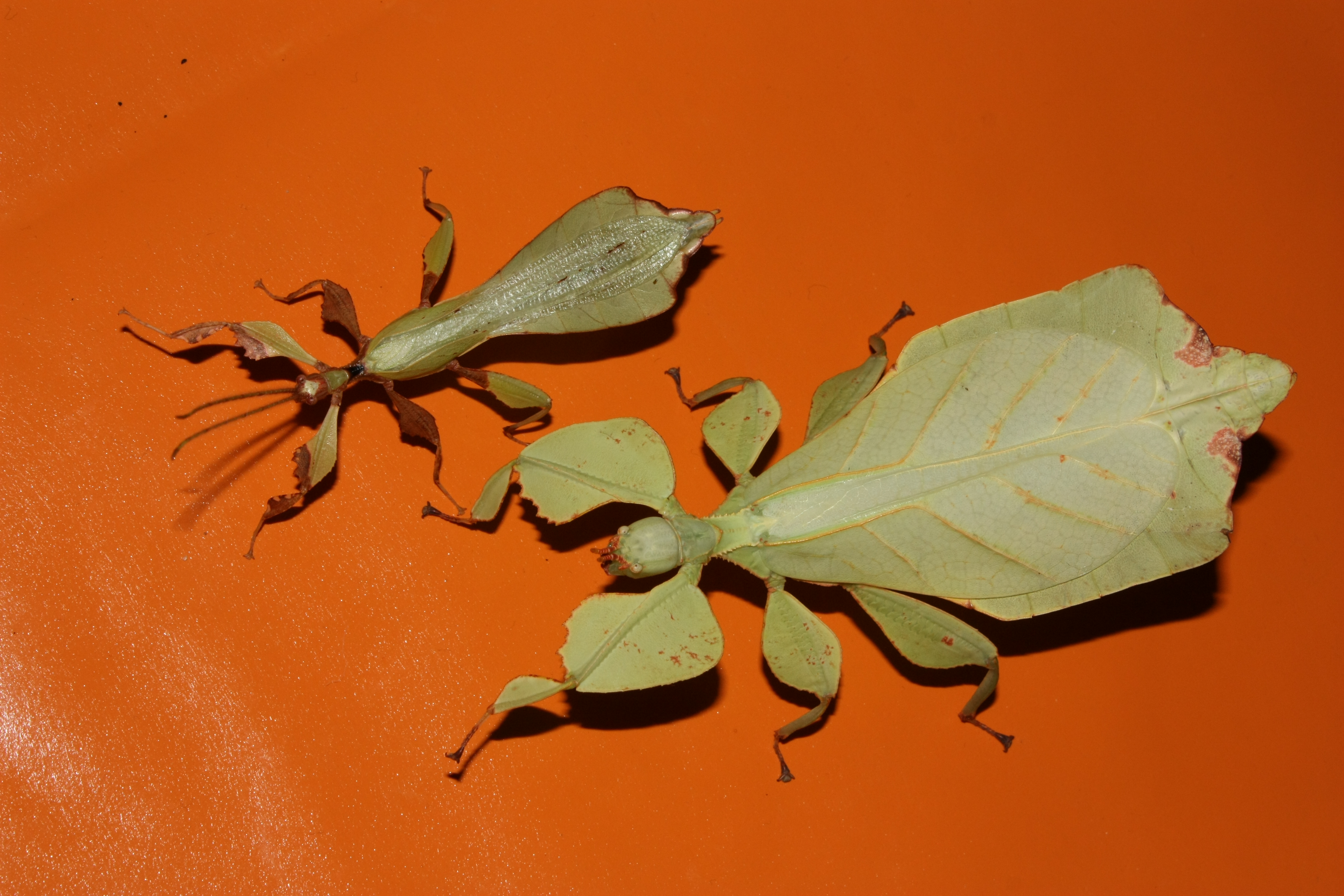

Scientific classification
- Domain: Eukaryota
- Kingdom: Animalia
- Phylum: Arthropoda
- Class: Insecta
- Order: Phasmatodea
- Family: Phylliidae
- Genus: Phyllium
- Species: P. ericoriai

Binomial name
- Phyllium ericoriai Hennemann, Conle, Gottardo & Bresseel, 2009

= Phyllium ericoriai =

Species of insect

Phyllium ericoriai is a species of leaf insect in the family Phylliidae.
