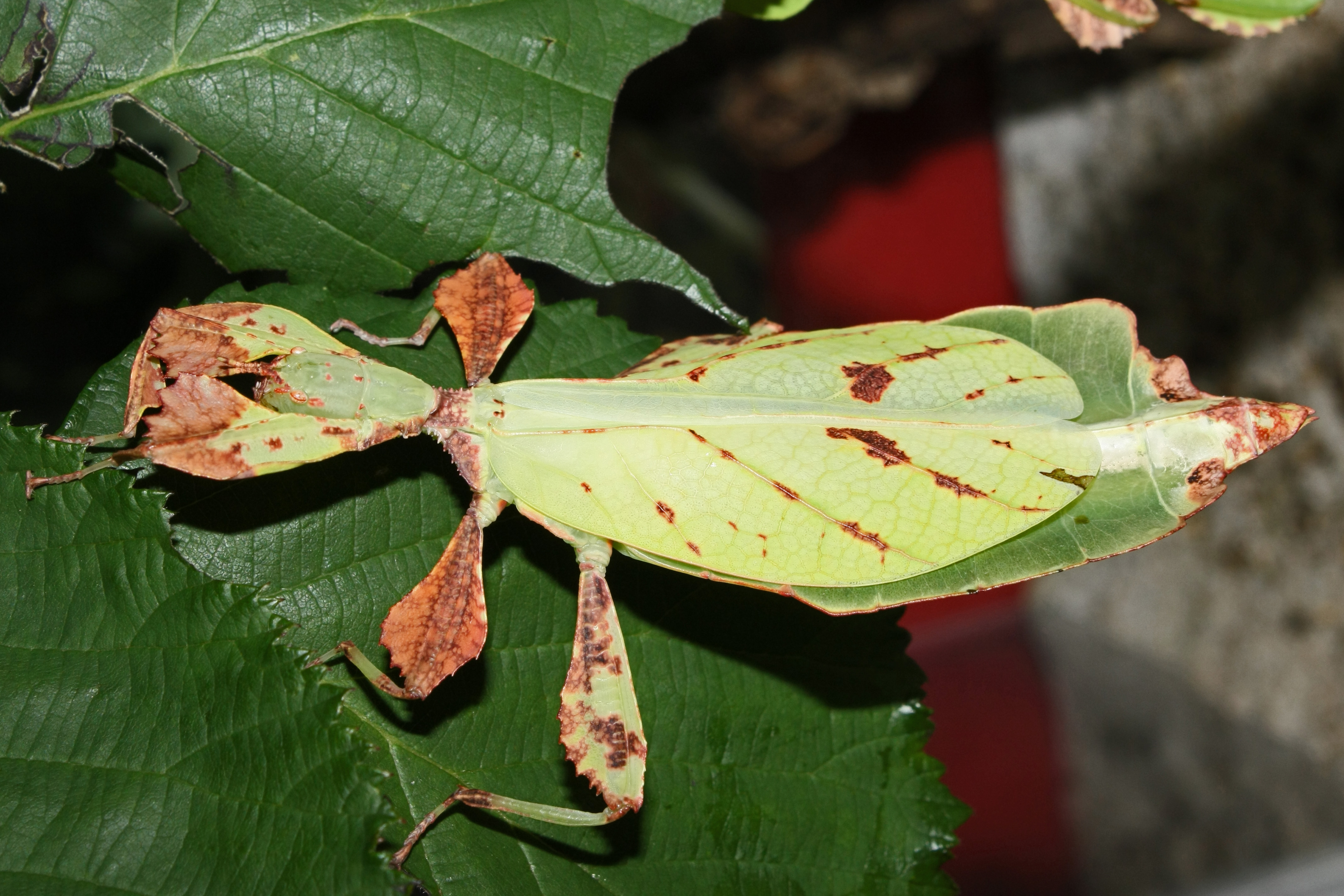
- Female Phyllium mabantai

Scientific classification
- Kingdom: Animalia
- Phylum: Arthropoda
- Clade: Pancrustacea
- Class: Insecta
- Order: Phasmatodea
- Family: Phylliidae
- Genus: Phyllium
- Species: P. mabantai

Binomial name
- Phyllium mabantai Bresseel, Hennemann, Conle & Gottardo, 2009

= Phyllium mabantai =

Species of leaf insect

Phyllium mabantai is a species of leaf insect in the family Phylliidae. It is endemic to the Philippines.

== Taxonomy ==
The species was described based on a female holotype from Lake Agko in the Philippines. The holotype is currently stored in the Royal Belgian Institute of Natural Sciences.

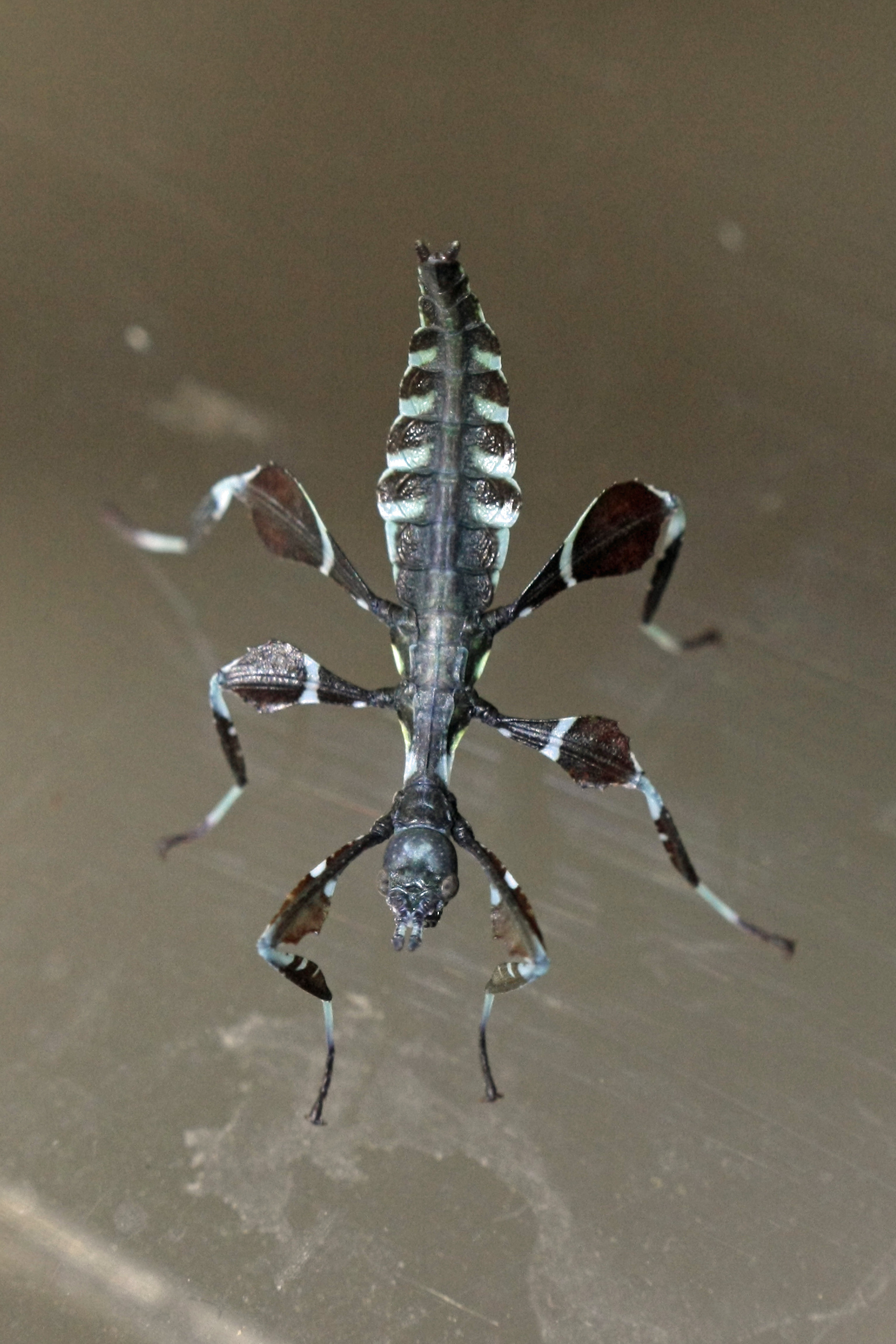
Nymph

== Distribution ==
Phyllium mabantai is endemic to the Philippines, where it is found on the islands of Mindanao, Samar, and Leyte.
