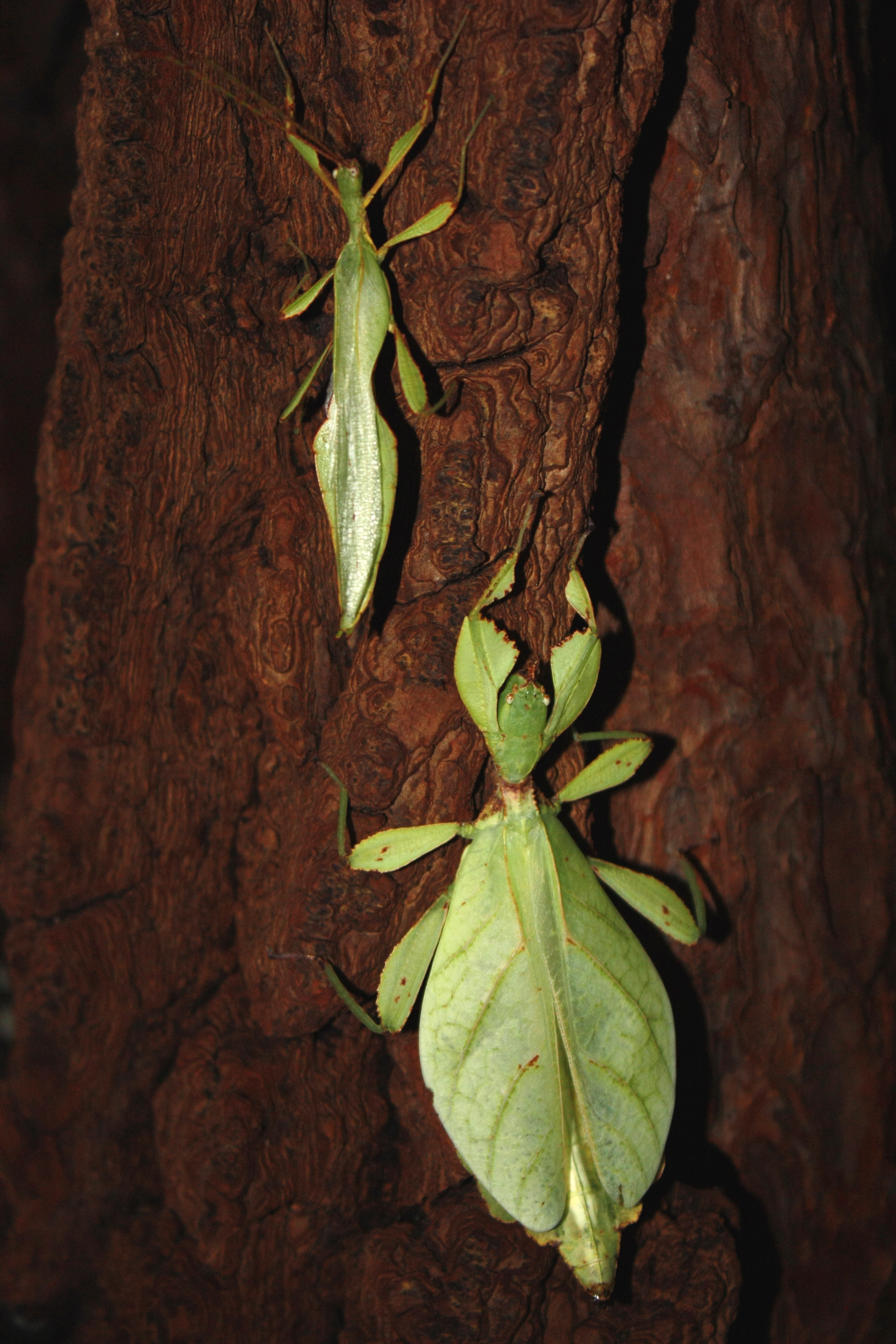

Scientific classification
- Domain: Eukaryota
- Kingdom: Animalia
- Phylum: Arthropoda
- Class: Insecta
- Order: Phasmatodea
- Family: Phylliidae
- Genus: Phyllium
- Subgenus: Phyllium
- Species: P. jacobsoni

Binomial name
- Phyllium jacobsoni Rehn, J.A.G. & J.W.H. Rehn, 1934

= Phyllium jacobsoni =

Species of leaf insect

Phyllium jacobsoni is a hybrid species of yellow/green leaf insect belonging to the family Phylliidae. Its recorded distribution is Java and no subspecies are listed in the Catalogue of Life.
