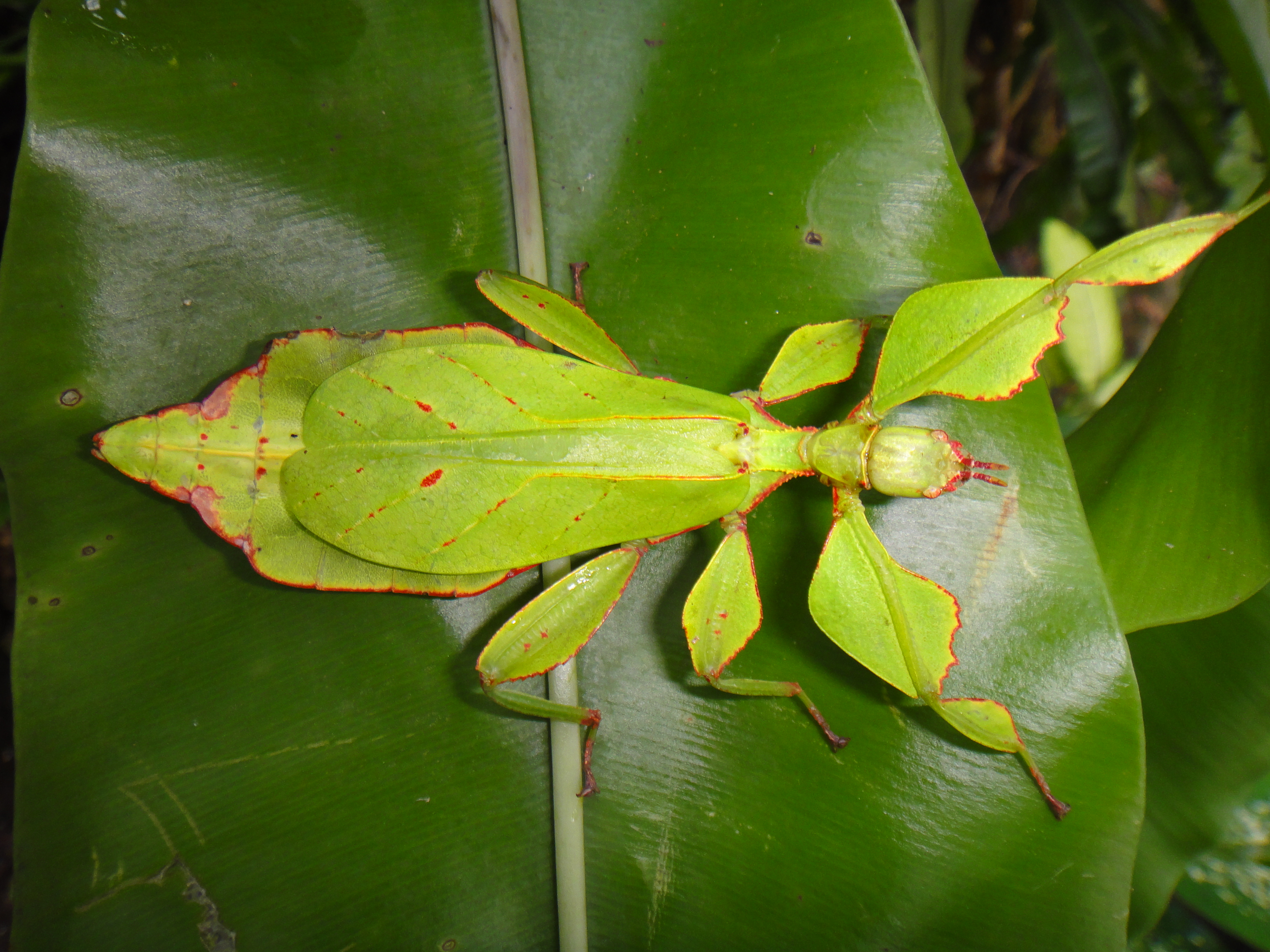
- Female

Scientific classification
- Kingdom: Animalia
- Phylum: Arthropoda
- Clade: Pancrustacea
- Class: Insecta
- Order: Phasmatodea
- Family: Phylliidae
- Genus: Phyllium
- Species: P. bonifacioi

Binomial name
- Phyllium bonifacioi Lit & Eusebio, 2014

= Phyllium bonifacioi =

Species of leaf insect

Phyllium bonifacioi is a species of phasmatodea in the family Phylliidae (leaf insect).

P. bonifacioi is found on the north of Luzon island, Philippines. This species was named after Andrés Bonifacio. P. bonifacioi feeds on guava leaves. The males are thinner than the females and have transparent wings, although the female has more leaf-like wings. They have short antennae. The colour is green with some brown spots. The length of P. bonifacioi is 1 cm (0.3 inches).
