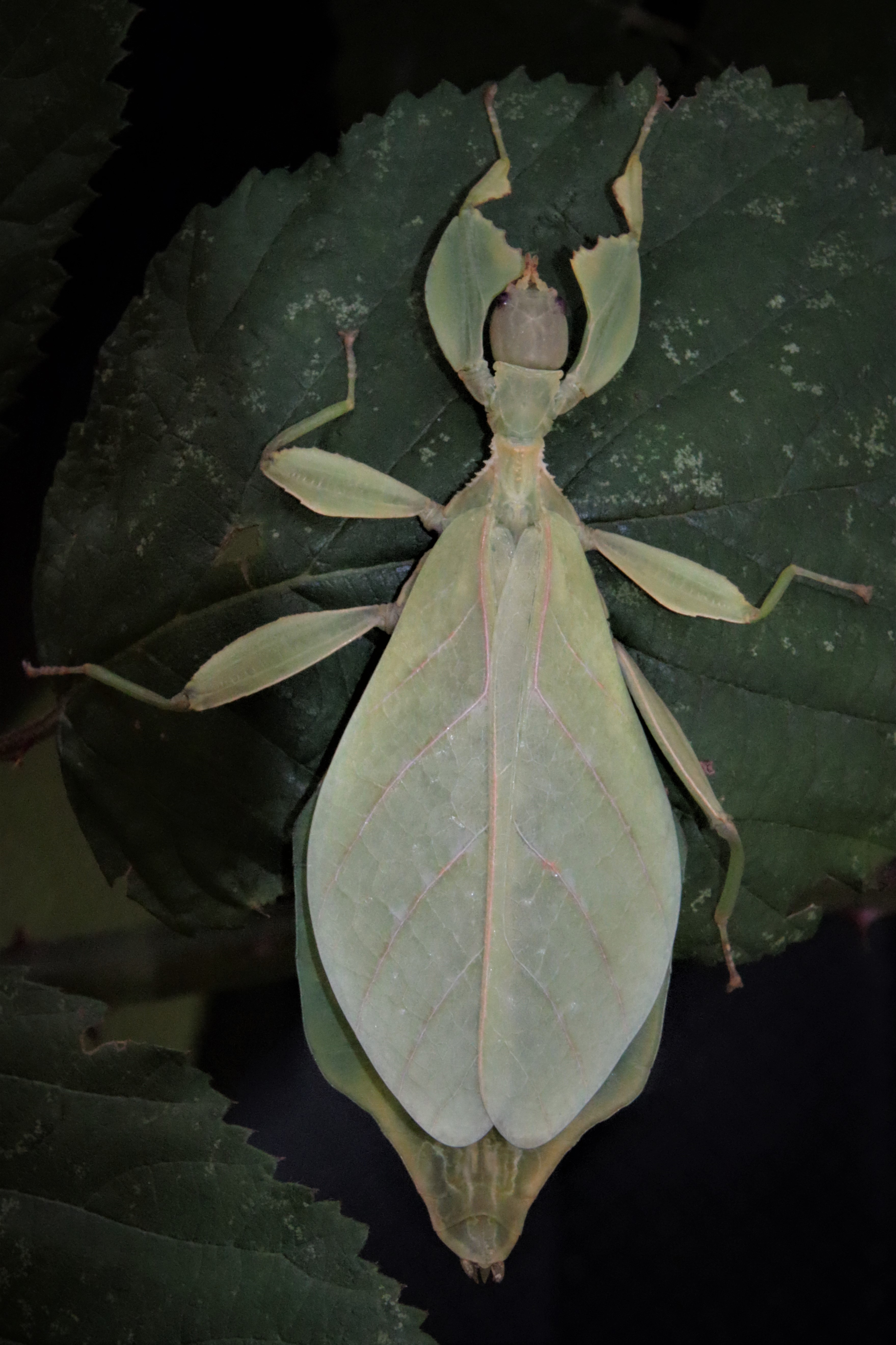

Scientific classification
- Kingdom: Animalia
- Phylum: Arthropoda
- Clade: Pancrustacea
- Class: Insecta
- Order: Phasmatodea
- Family: Phylliidae
- Genus: Phyllium
- Species: P. gantungense

Binomial name
- Phyllium gantungense Hennemann, Conle, Gottardo & Bresseel, 2009

= Phyllium gantungense =

Species of insect

Phyllium gantungense is a species of insect in the family Phylliidae. It is endemic to the Philippines.

== Taxonomy ==
Phyllium gantungense was described in 2009 on the basis of a female holotype from Mount Gantung, Palawan. The holotype is currently stored in the Museum of Natural History, Genoa.
