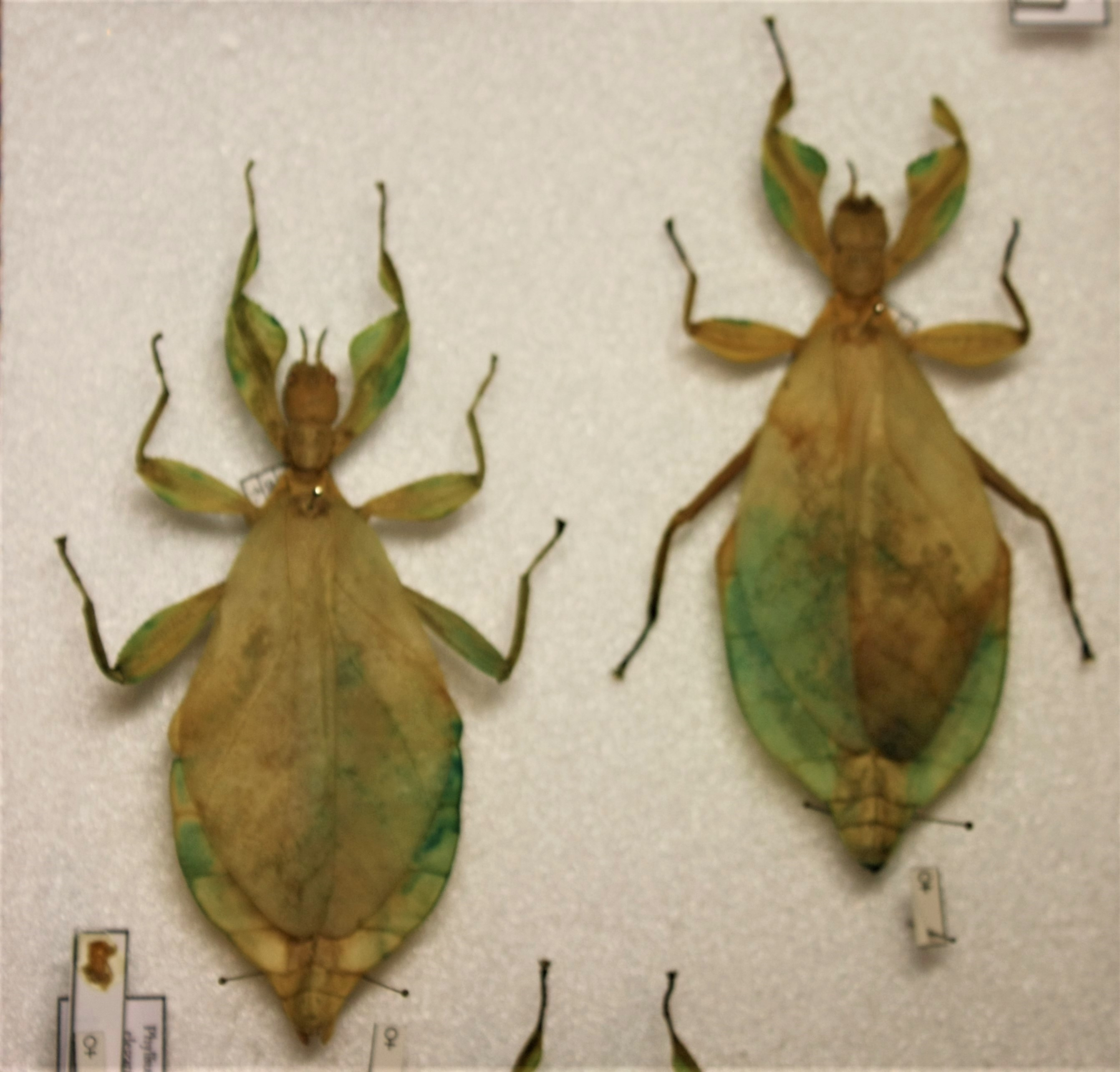

Scientific classification
- Domain: Eukaryota
- Kingdom: Animalia
- Phylum: Arthropoda
- Class: Insecta
- Order: Phasmatodea
- Family: Phylliidae
- Genus: Phyllium
- Species: P. elegans

Binomial name
- Phyllium elegans Grösser, 1991

= Phyllium elegans =

Species of insect

Phyllium elegans is a species of insect in the family Phylliidae. It is endemic to New Guinea.

== Taxonomy ==
It was described in 1991 on the basis of a female holotype from Papua New Guinea. The holotype is currently stored in the Bavarian State Collection of Zoology.
