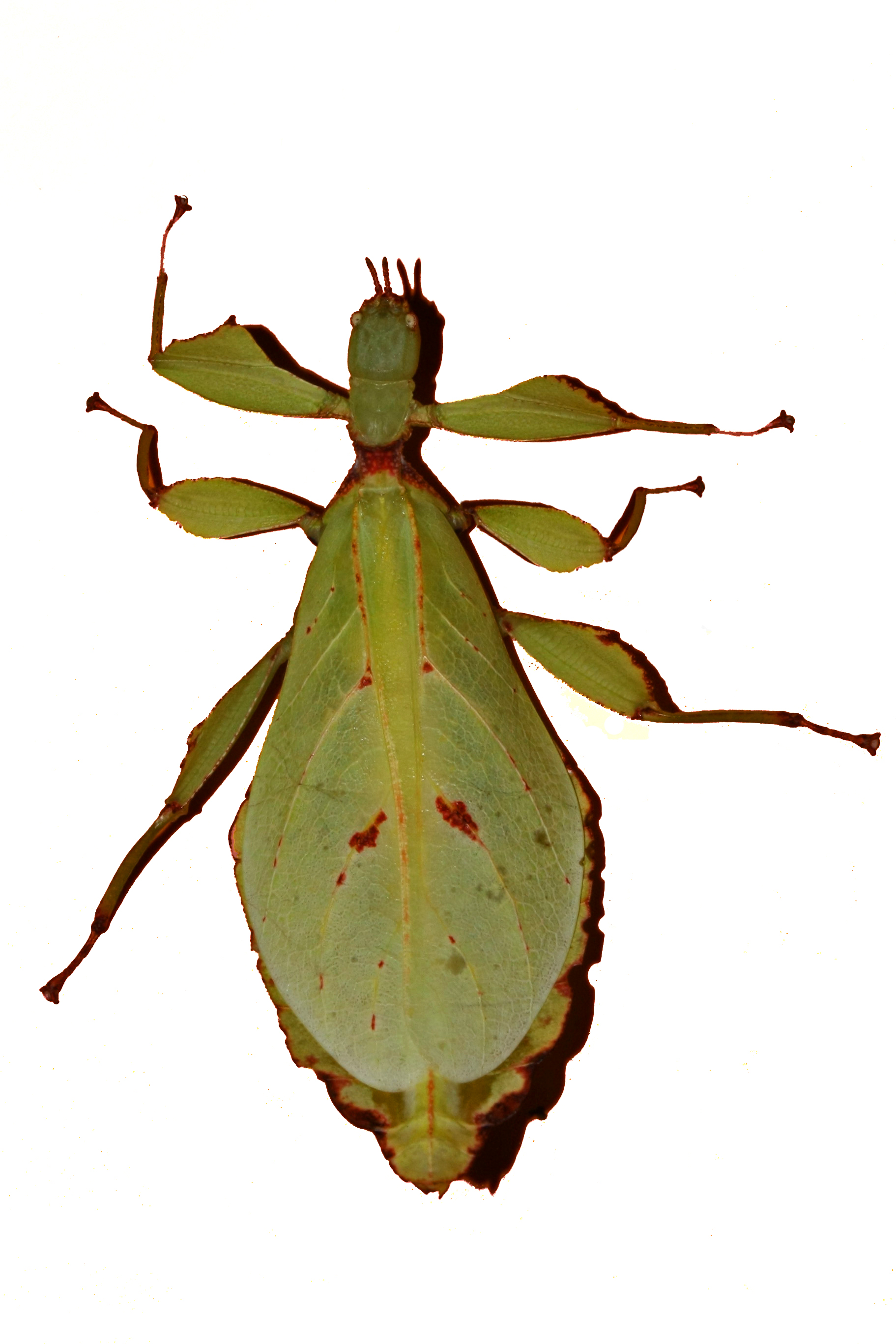
- Adult female

Scientific classification
- Kingdom: Animalia
- Phylum: Arthropoda
- Class: Insecta
- Order: Phasmatodea
- Family: Phylliidae
- Genus: Phyllium
- Subgenus: Phyllium
- Species: P. bilobatum

Binomial name
- Phyllium bilobatum Gray, 1843

= Phyllium bilobatum =

Species of leaf insect

Phyllium bilobatum is a species of leaf insect in the family Phylliidae. It is found in the Philippines and Malaysia. This species was first described in 1843 by the English zoologist George Robert Gray, who gave it the name Phyllium bilobatum. It has been assigned to the subgenus Phyllium, which is to be distinguished from the second subgenus Pulchriphyllium, within the genus Phyllium. The holotype is a female from the Philippines, which is kept in the Natural History Museum, London where Gray worked cataloguing insects.

== Distribution ==
Phyllium bilobatum occurs in the Philippines and Malaysia. The Malaysian records, however, might represent other species.

== Description ==
Phyllium bilobatum grows to a length of about 2.9 in (7.4 cm). Like other leaf insects it is well camouflaged, mimicking a leaf; the general colour is mid-green, the wings being patterned by dark lines, arranged to resemble the veins of a leaf, and the limbs having large flanges or flap-like extensions. The female has a broad body while the body of the male is slender. The single pair of wings lie flat on the insect's back, and only the adult male can fly. The abdomen of the female is narrow where it joins the thorax, with the second and third segments being wider than the one in front and the fourth and fifth narrowing again. The sixth and seventh segments are lobed, and the remaining segments narrow abruptly to the tip of the abdomen. The femur of the first pair of legs has a flange on both the front and the back, the inner side being smooth while the outer side is toothed. The tibia is also flanged. The second and third pairs of legs also have flanges.

== Ecology ==
Leaf insects are herbivorous, feeding mainly on the leaves of trees and shrubs. They are hemimetabolous, the eggs hatching into nymphs which pass through a number of moults as they grow, but do not undergo metamorphosis. Young nymphs tend to hide in withered leaves, which at this stage they resemble more closely in colour than they do green foliage. Both sexes of this species have glands on the prothorax, from which they spray an unpleasant-smelling defensive secretion when disturbed.
