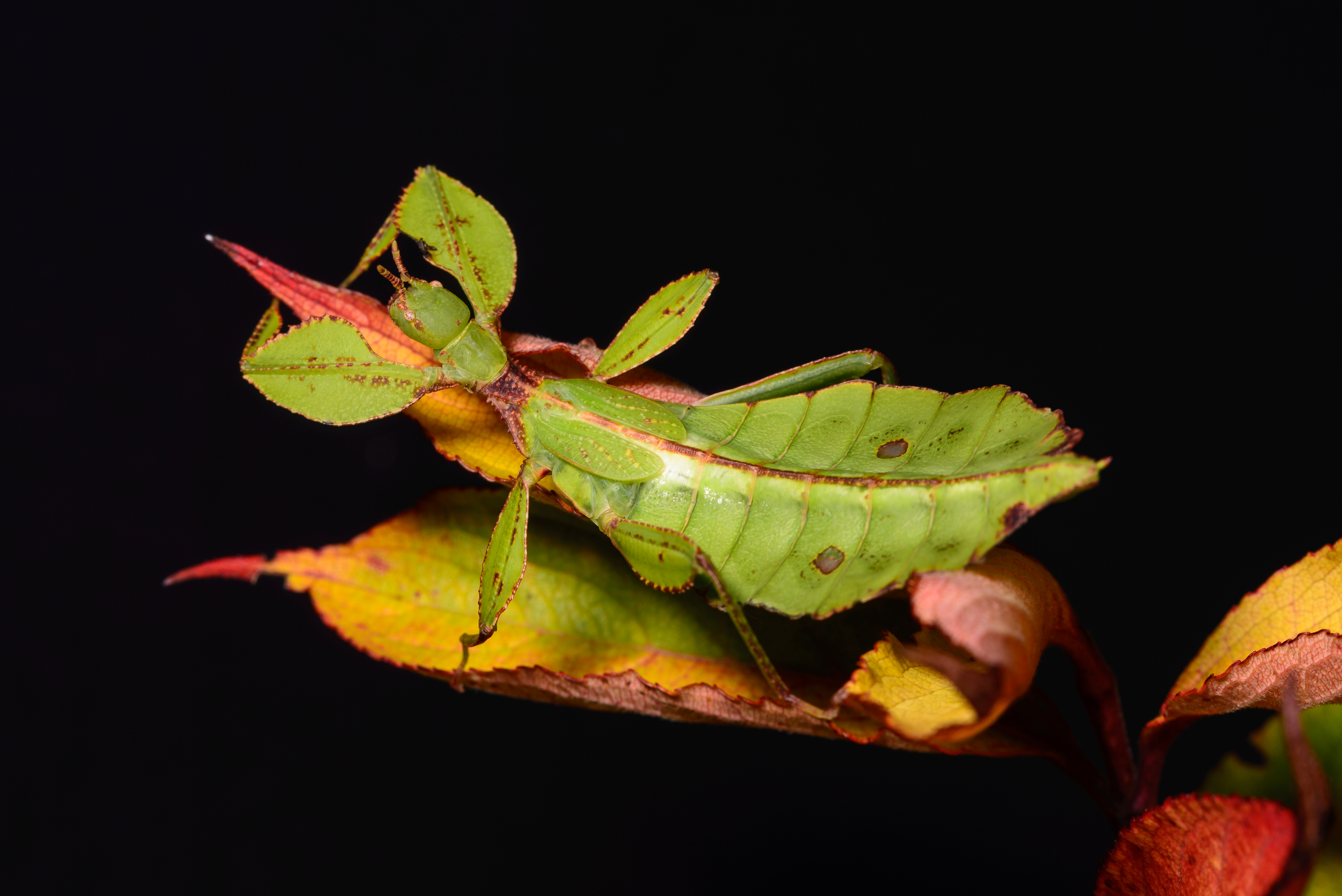

Scientific classification
- Kingdom: Animalia
- Phylum: Arthropoda
- Clade: Pancrustacea
- Class: Insecta
- Order: Phasmatodea
- Family: Phylliidae
- Genus: Phyllium
- Species: P. philippinicum

Binomial name
- Phyllium philippinicum Hennemann, Conle, Gottardo & Bresseel, 2009

= Phyllium philippinicum =

Species of leaf insect

Phyllium philippinicum is a species of leaf insect in the family Phylliidae. It is endemic to the Philippines.

== Taxonomy ==
Phyllium philippinicum was described on the basis of a female holotype from Ilanin Forest in the Bataan Province. The holotype is currently stored in the Bavarian State Collection of Zoology.

It is in the subgenus Phyllium.

== Distribution ==
It is found on Luzon.
