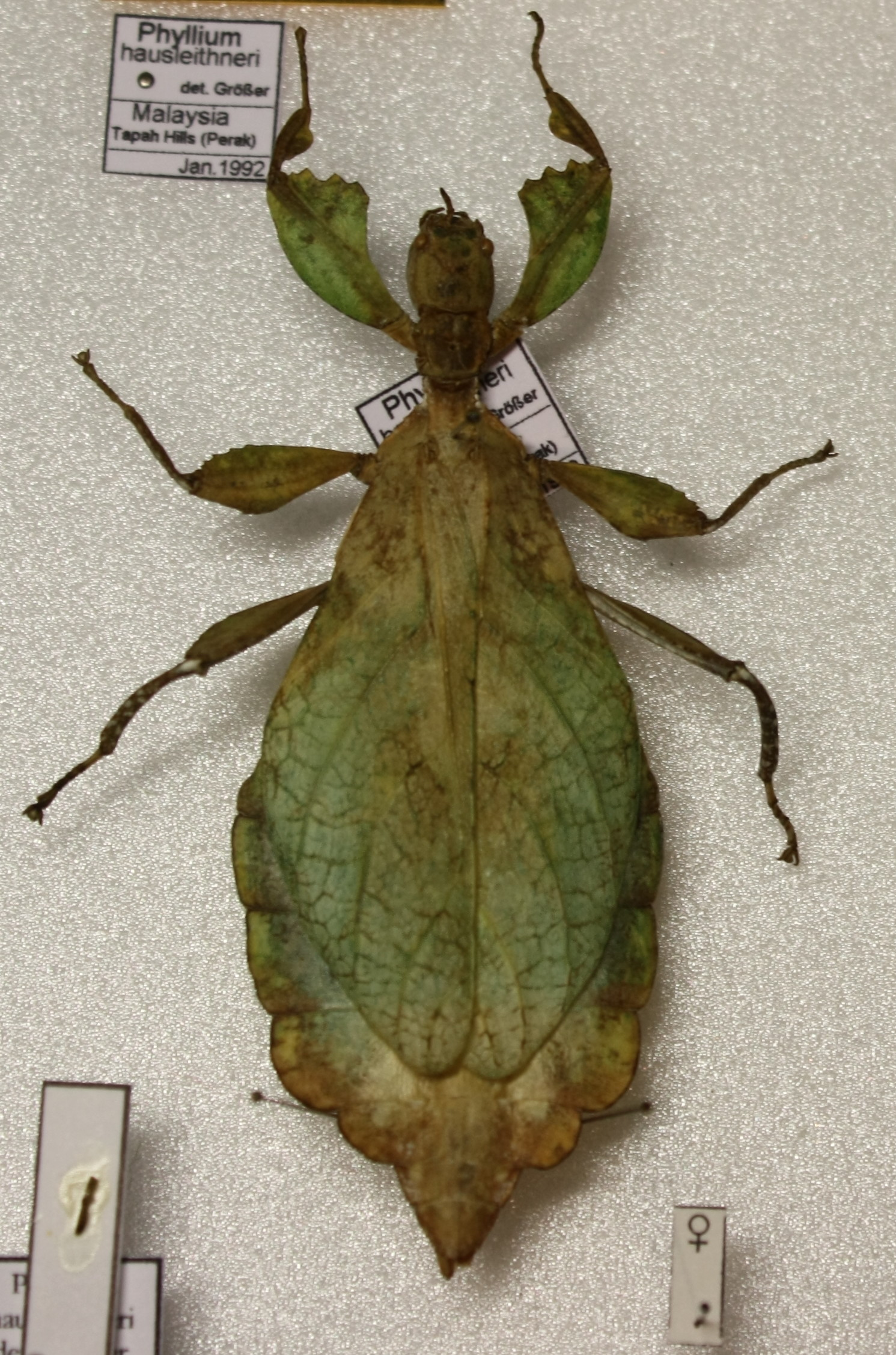
- Female

Scientific classification
- Kingdom: Animalia
- Phylum: Arthropoda
- Class: Insecta
- Order: Phasmatodea
- Family: Phylliidae
- Genus: Phyllium
- Subgenus: Phyllium
- Species: P. hausleithneri

Binomial name
- Phyllium hausleithneri Westwood, 1859

Synonyms
- Phyllium hausleithneri Brock, 1999

= Phyllium hausleithneri =

Hausleithner's stick insect

Species of stick insect

Phyllium hausleithneri or Hausleithner's stick insect is a species of phasmid or leaf insect of the genus Phyllium. It is found in peninsular Malaysia, and Sri Lanka.
