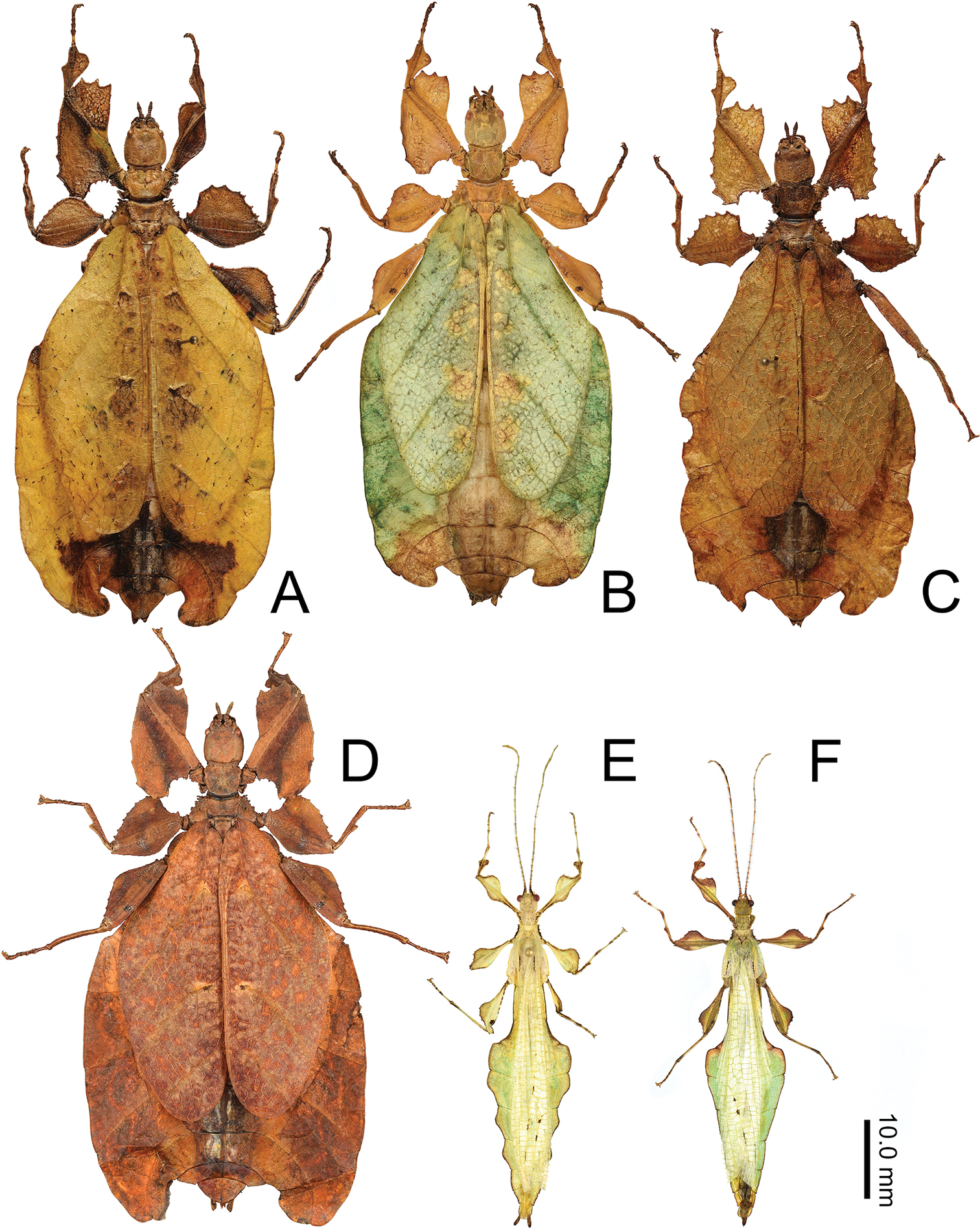
- Nanophyllium asekiense, A–D females, E-F males

Scientific classification
- Kingdom: Animalia
- Phylum: Arthropoda
- Clade: Pancrustacea
- Class: Insecta
- Order: Phasmatodea
- Suborder: Euphasmatodea
- Superfamily: Phyllioidea
- Family: Phylliidae
- Tribe: Nanophylliini
- Genus: Nanophyllium; Redtenbacher, 1906

Type species
- Nanophyllium pygmaeum Redtenbacher, 1906

Species
- List: Nanophyllium adisi; Nanophyllium asekiense; Nanophyllium australianum; Nanophyllium chitoniscoides; Nanophyllium daphne; Nanophyllium frondosum; Nanophyllium hasenpuschi; Nanophyllium keyicum; Nanophyllium pygmaeum; Nanophyllium rentzi; Nanophyllium suzukii

= Nanophyllium =

Genus of stick insects

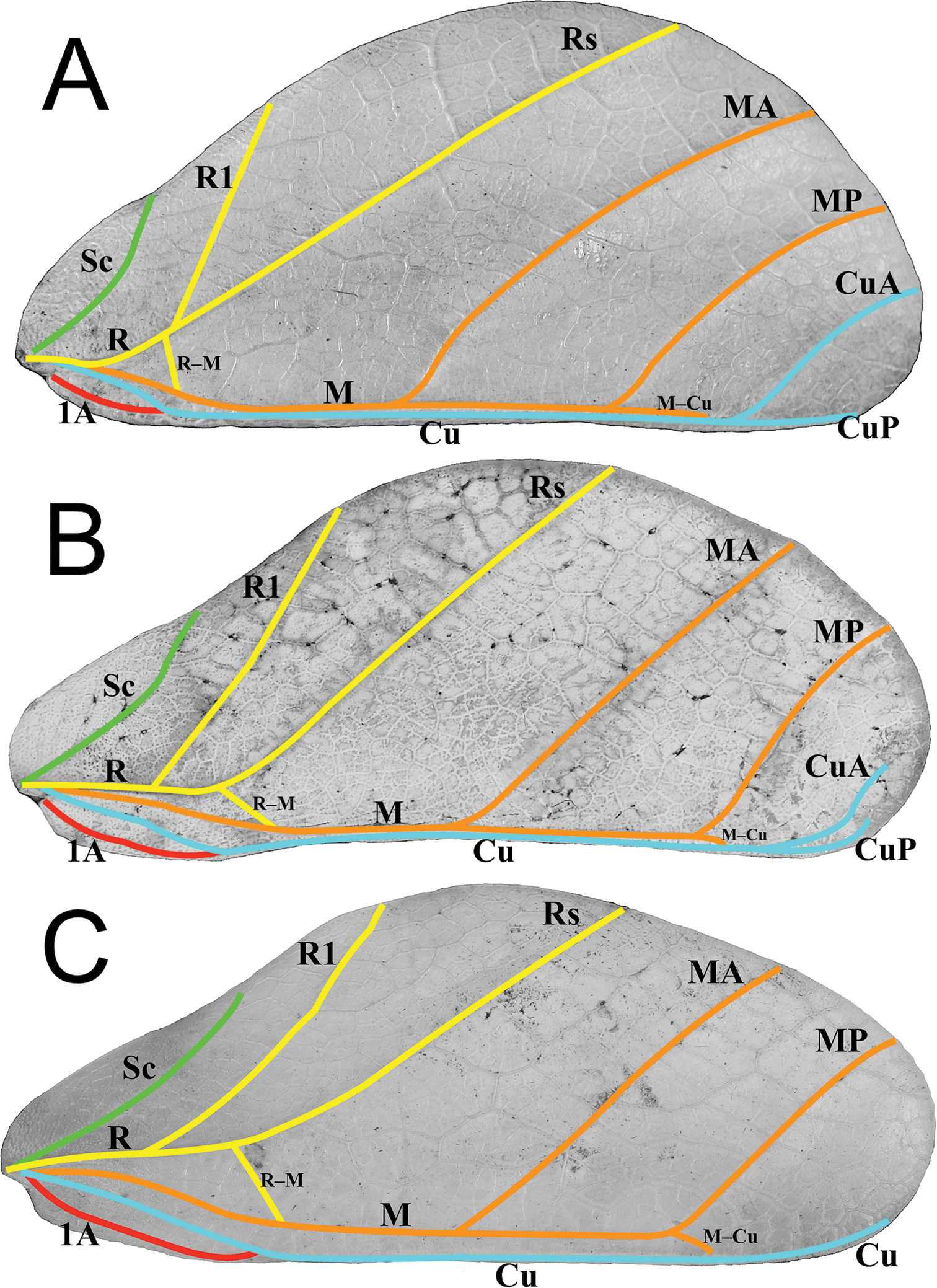
Wing venation of the forewings of females of A Nanophyllium chitoniscoides, B Nanophyllium suzukii and C Nanophyllium keyicum

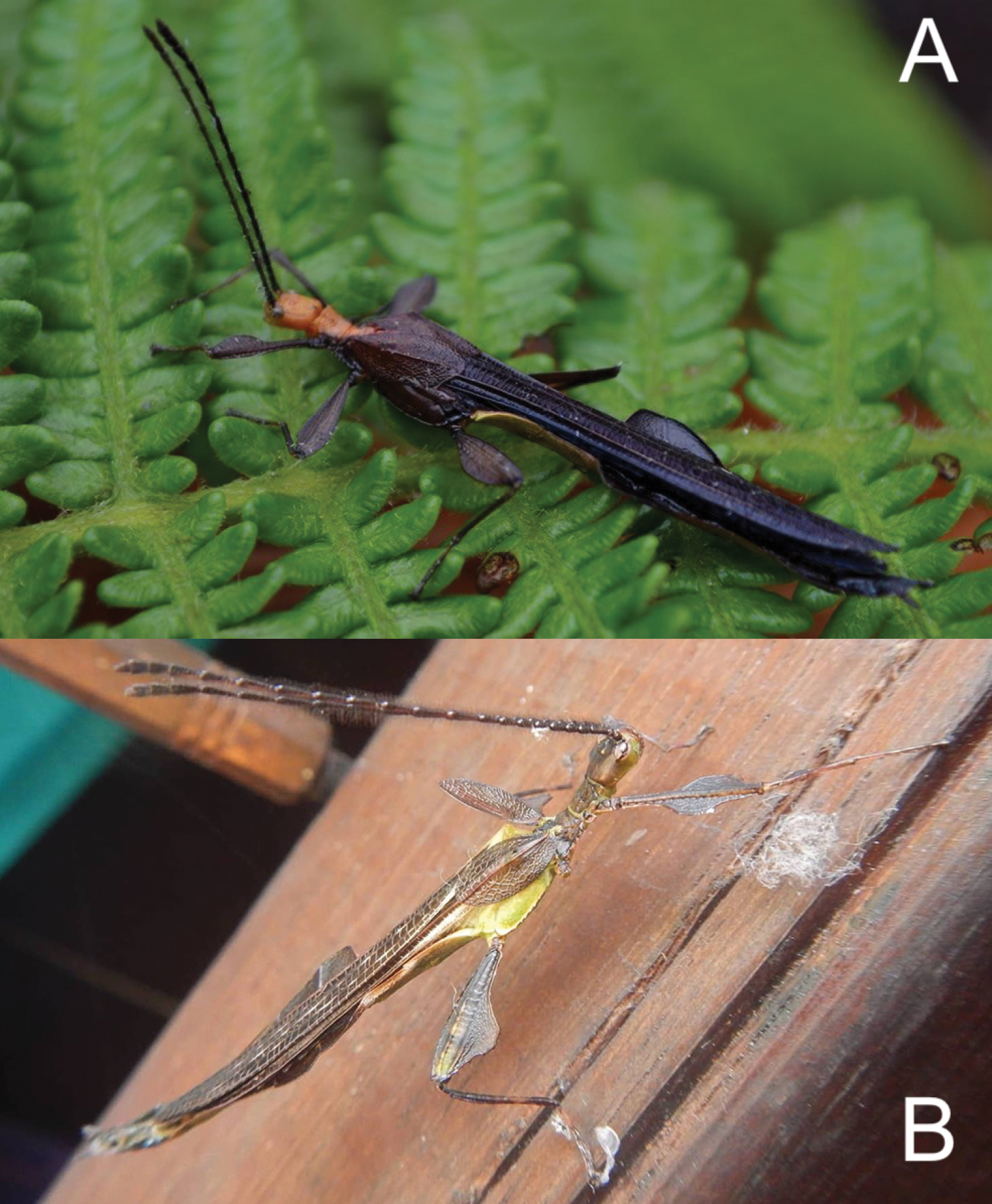
Unidentified males of Nanophyllium species from Western New Guinea A from Mokndoma and B from Aiduma Island

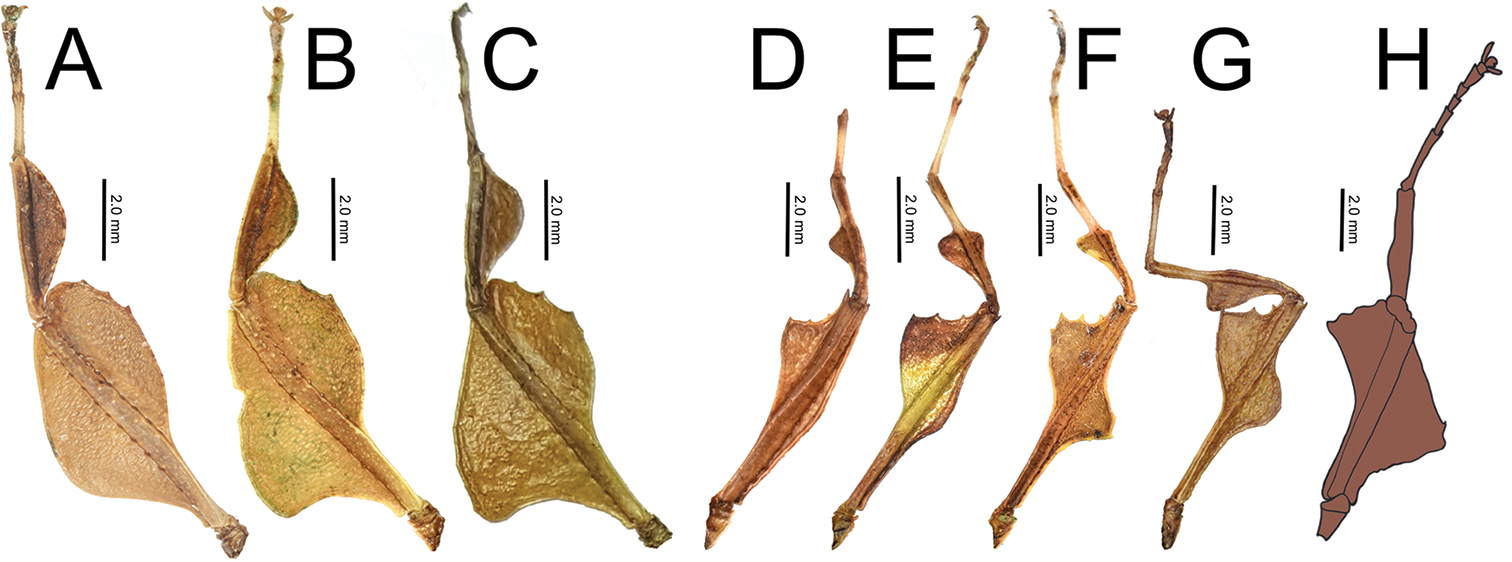
Forelegs of males of A-C Acentetaphyllium and D-H Nannophyllium: A A. stellae, B A. miyashitai, C A. larssoni, D N. australianum, E N. asekiense, F N. rentzi, G N. hasenpuschi, H N. adisi

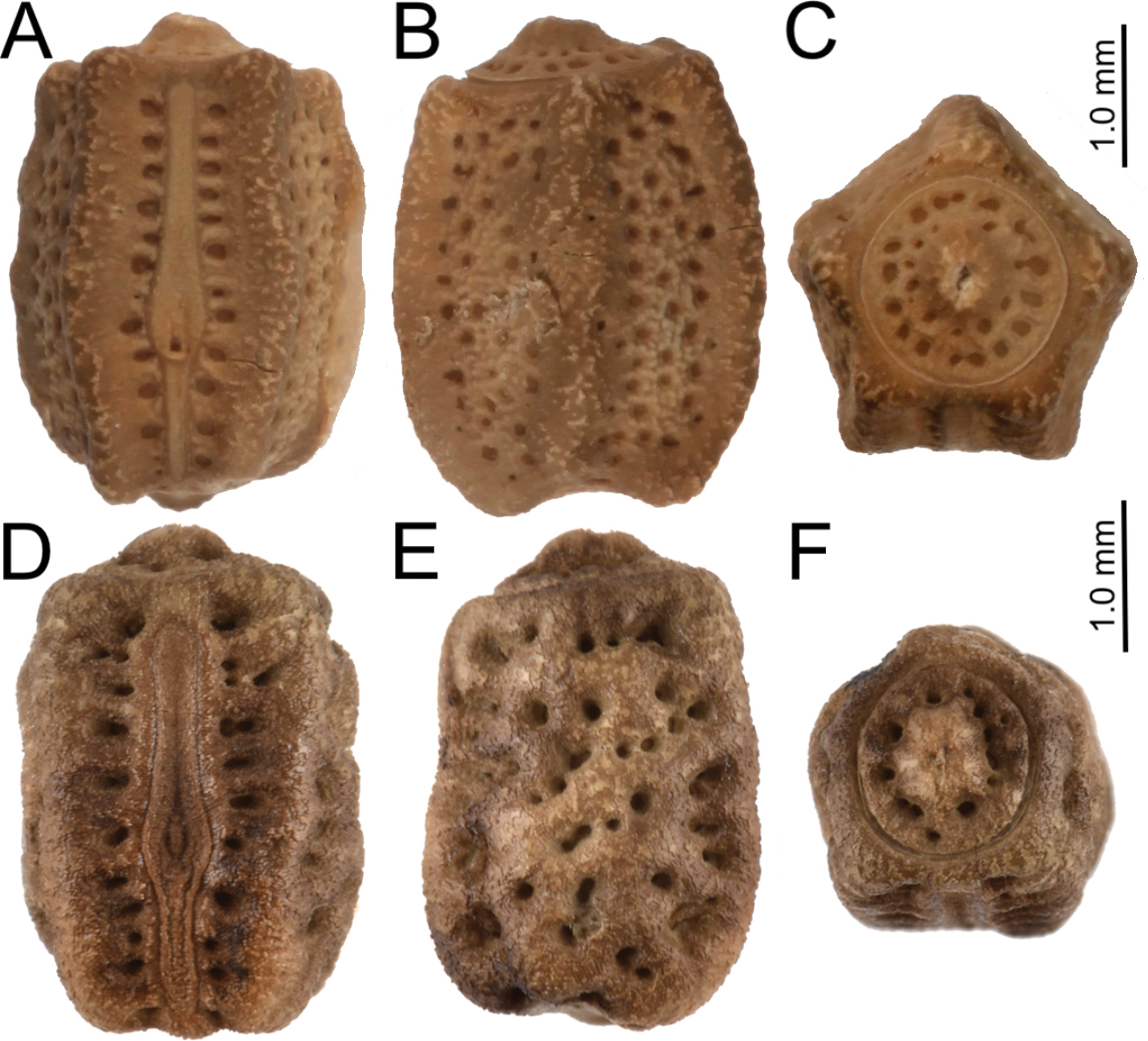
A–C Eggs of Nanophyllium asekiense: A dorsal, B lateral, C opercular (anterior); D–F eggs of Nanophyllium sp. from the NHMUK: D dorsal, E lateral, F opercular

Nanophyllium is a genus of stick insects described in 2022, belonging to the Phylliidae (leaf insects) which is native to New Guinea and northeastern Australia.

== Description ==
The genus Nanohyllium comprises rather small to medium-sized species of leaf insects. Females reach body lengths between 46.5 to 79 millimetres (1.83 to 3.11 in). Males have been documented with body lengths of 27 to 40 millimetres (1.1 to 1.6 in). A characteristic feature of the genus in both sexes is that the posterior median tubercles on the head are split into two parts and are not formed as a single tubercle, as in most other leave insects.

The antennae of the females consist of nine or ten segments. Prominent tubercles are always present on the pleurae of the mesothorax. They are significantly wider at their anterior end than the prescutum. The forewings (tegmina) extend to the seventh or eighth segment of the abdomen. Three distinct patterns of longitudinal veins can be identified in the forewings of females of Nanophyllium. In smaller species with a body length up to 56 millimetres (2.2 in), such as Nanophyllium chitoniscoides and Nanophyllium daphne, the radial (R) bend occurs before the splitting of the first radial (R1) and the radial sector (RS), therefore the radial sector is straight. These females have a radius and medial crossvein (R-M) present on the radial (R) bend at or before the splitting of the first radial (R1). The cubitus (Cu) is clearly split into the anterior cubitus (CuA) and posterior cubitus (CuP) veins with a clearly defined gap between them. In larger species, such as Nanophyllium asekiense, Nanophyllium frondosum, and Nanophyllium suzukii, the radial vein (R) bends in the radial segment (RS) after the first radial vein (R1) branches off from the radius. The median radial crossvein (R-M) lies behind the branch of the first radial vein (R1) and originates only in the radial segment (RS). The cubitus (Cu) may be weakly divided at its end into an anterior (CuA) and a posterior cubitus (CuP), but in many specimens it is simple and unbranched. Unlike the smaller species, it is not distinctly divided with a large gap between the anterior and posterior cubitus. The last venation pattern is found in Nanophyllium keyicum, the only species in this genus that has a wide gapa between the media (M) and cubitus (Cu) veins, extending the entire length of the media. This gap is several times wider than a single vein width. In the larger species Nanophyllium asekiense and Nanophyllium suzukii, the media and cubitus veins run parallel to each other along their entire length, no more than one vein width apart. In smaller species such as Nanophyllium daphne, these veins are at most two to three vein widths apart in the anterior region. However, the distance decreases at the bifurcation of the posterior media (MP), and the veins then run parallel to each other. In Nanophyllium keyicum, the radial median crossvein (R-M) arises only after the first radius (R1) splits off and originates in the radial segment (RS). Similar to the larger species, the cubitus (Cu) may be weakly divided at its end into an anterior (CuA) and a posterior cubitus (CuP), but in most specimens of Nanophyllium keyicum, it is simple and unbranched. Hindwings (alae) are absent in all known female Nanophyllium.

Males of Nanophyllium can be green to yellowish, but also almost entirely greyish-brown, brown, or nearly black. Black specimens with a reddish-brown head and/or body are also known. They have angular inner lobes of the femurs of the forelegs (profemoral interior lobes) with three to four small teeth and inner lobes on the femurs of the midlegs (mesofemoral interior lobes), which do not extend the full length of the femora and have distinctly serrated teeth. The forewings (tegmina) of males are short and never extend beyond the posterior end of the metathorax. Their veins are rather simple and strongly sclerotized. The hindwings (alae) of males can be transparent, dark-colored, or marbled. In males of Nanophyllium hasenpuschi, they are broadly brown-edged and transparent in the middle and towards the body. A typical feature of the vein formation is that the anterior media (MA) and the posterior media (MP) merge again after their division and then run together as a single vein to the wing margin without merging with other veins. The vomer, a movable sclerite located on the tenth tergum of the male abdomen and used for anchoring to the seventh sternum of the female abdomen, is long and slender in Nanophyllium and has a single apical hook.

Eggs are known from various Nanophyllium species. In cross-section, they are approximately pentagonal. Their surface is rough and exhibits pits of varying sizes across the entire capsule surface. The capsule lacks pinnae but has pits on its surface, which can be very deep or shallow depending on the species. The lid (operculum) has distinct pits around its central, slightly raised tip. The micropylar plate is elongated and extends almost the entire length of the capsule. Its width is nearly uniform, except in the region of the micropylar cup, where it is somewhat wider. Pits run parallel to the edge of the micropylar plate; their number varies depending on the species.

== Occurrence and way of life ==
The distribution area of the genus Nanophyllium lies east of the Weber Line and includes New Guinea and the surrounding islands, as well as northeastern Australia. Nanophyllium australianum, along with Walaphyllium monteithi, is the only other leaf insect species described from Australia to date and, like it, is endemic to Queensland. In Indonesia, it has been recorded on the Maluku Islands of Batjan, Buru, and the Kei Islands, as well as in the provinces of Papua and West Papua in New Guinea (including, among others, Aiduma Island). In Papua New Guinea, the locations where the genus have been found are distributed across Western Province, Chimbu Province, Eastern Highlands Province, Gulf Province, Morobe Province, Central Province, and Oro Province, as well as the Normanby Island.

According to current findings based on observations of Nanophyllium asekiense, the eggs take seven to nine months to hatch. The nymphs are active both day and night and feed continuously. A difference between the sexes is only noticeable in the last two larval stages. Males take about three months, females slightly more than four, to reach adulthood. Males are active day and night and fly around actively in search of females. They live for about four months. Adult females feed only at night. They lay about 250 eggs during their up to nine-month lifespan. During the peak egg-laying period, three to four eggs are laid daily, amounting to up to 112 eggs per month.

== Taxonomy ==
In 1906, Josef Redtenbacher described the genus Nanophyllium based on the type species Nanophyllium pygmaeum, which he described at the same time. The only known specimen of this species is the male holotype described by Redtenbacher. Almost 100 years passed before further species were described, and the four species described between 2002 and 2018, Nanophyllium adisi, Nanophyllium hasenpuschi, Nanophyllium rentzi, and Nanophyllium australianum, were all described based on males. Females of these species are unknown. The same applies to three further species described in the genus Nanophyllium between 2016 and 2020. These have been classified in the genus Acentetaphyllium since 2022.

Royce T. Cumming et al. recognized in 2020 that there further species already described in the genus Phyllium, more precisely in its then-existing subgenus Pulchriphyllium, which should be assigned to Nanophyllium. These are five of the six species of the frondosum group, which was established in 2009 by Frank H. Hennemann et al. as a subgroup of the genus Phyllium. Only the females of these species were previously known. Cumming et al. reached this conclusion after the Montreal Insectarium received eggs of Phyllium (Pulchriphyllium) asekiense from the Morobe Province in Papua New Guinea in April 2018. Of the nymphs that hatched from the eggs, one female and two males were successfully raised. The latter were previously unknown and were clearly identified as representatives of Nanophyllium. Thus, Nanophyllium asekiense is the only species to date for which both sexes are known with certainty. In 2020, Cumming et al. described two further species in the genus Nanophyllium: Nanophyllium daphne and Nanophyllium miyashitai. The latter was assigned to the stellae species group, which also included the eponymous Nanophyllium stellae and Nanophyllium larssoni. All other Nanophyllium species have been placed in the pygmaeum species group.

Sarah Bank et al. transferred Phyllium brevipenne, known only from females, to the genus Nanophyllium in 2021. In 2022, it was transferred to the genus Acentetaphyllium by Cumming and Stéphane Le Tirant, along with the three species of the stellae group.

The name "Nanophyllium" means "dwarf leaf" and is composed of the Latinized name Phyllium, the type genus of the family (from the Greek φυλλον, -ου (phyllon, -oy)), and the prefix "nano," from the Greek νᾶνος (nãnos), meaning dwarf. It refers to the very small size of the male type species, which measures 28 mm in length. Like Phyllium, Nanophyllium is also neuter.

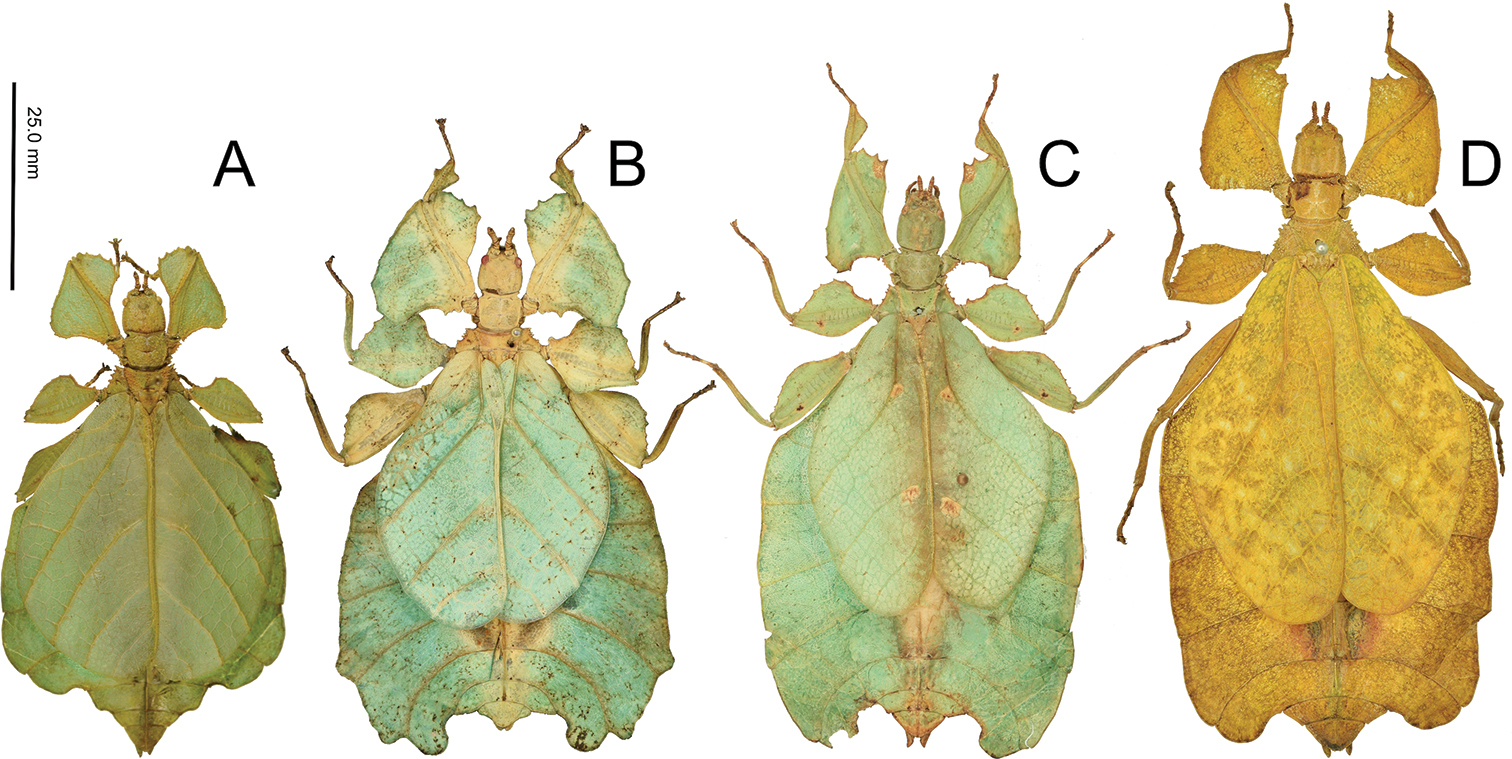
Females of A Nanophyllium chitoniscoides, B Nanophyllium suzukii, C Nanophyllium frondosum and D Nanophyllium keyicum

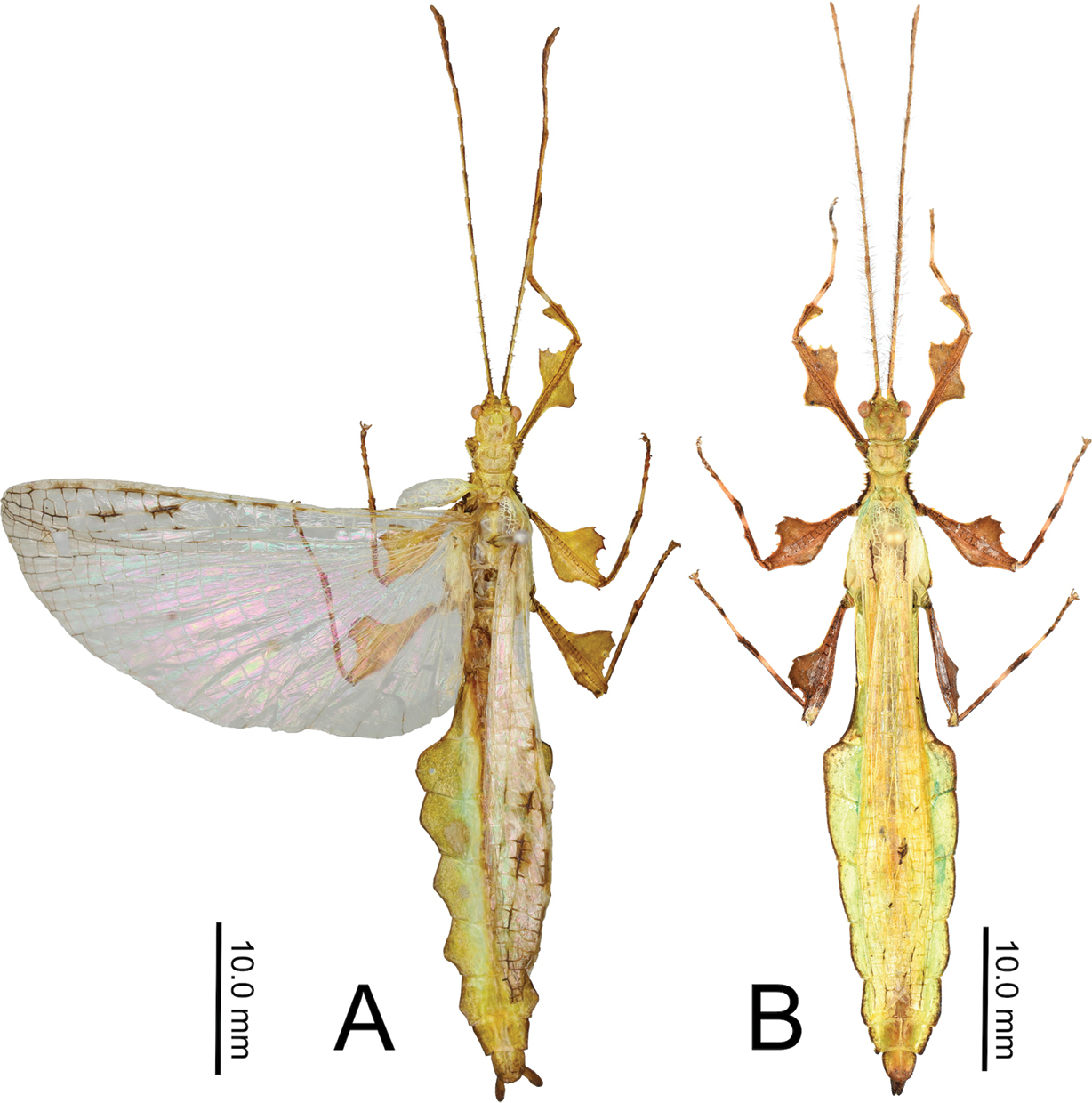
Males of Nanophyllium rentzi

The genus Nanophyllium currently comprises the following species:

- Nanophyllium adisi Zompro & Grösser, 2003
- Nanophyllium asekiense Grösser, 2002
- Nanophyllium australianum Cumming, Le Tirant & Teemsma, 2018
- Nanophyllium chitoniscoides (Grösser, 1992)
- Nanophyllium daphne Cumming, Le Tirant, Teemsma, Hennemann, Willemse & Büscher, 2020
- Nanophyllium frondosum (Redtenbacher, 1906)
- Nanophyllium hasenpuschi Brock & Grösser, 2008
- Nanophyllium keyicum (Karny, 1914)
- Nanophyllium pygmaeum Redtenbacher, 1906 - type species
- Nanophyllium rentzi Brock & Grösser, 2008
- Nanophyllium suzukii (Grösser, 2008)

In addition to these species, Cumming et al. documented findings of juvenile and adult specimens in 2020, which either belong to as yet undescribed species or could be the as-yet-unknown sexes of already described species. For example, it is suggested that two subadult females from Queensland belong to Nanophyllium australianum.

In 2021, Sarah Bank et al. examined a sample of the later Acentetaphyllium brevipenne as well as samples from five Nanophyllium species on their molecular genetic studies. Cumming and Le Tirant, in 2022, based on the results of these investigations and morphological characteristics, classified the genus phylogenetically using Bayesian inference and placed it in a clade with Comptaphyllium, Acentetaphyllium, Trolicaphyllium, and Walaphyllium, classifying it as a sister genus of Acentetaphyllium. No special status for Nanophyllium and Acentetaphyllium within the leave insects was apparent that would justify their classification in the tribe Nanophylliini (see also Cladogram of the Phylliidae).

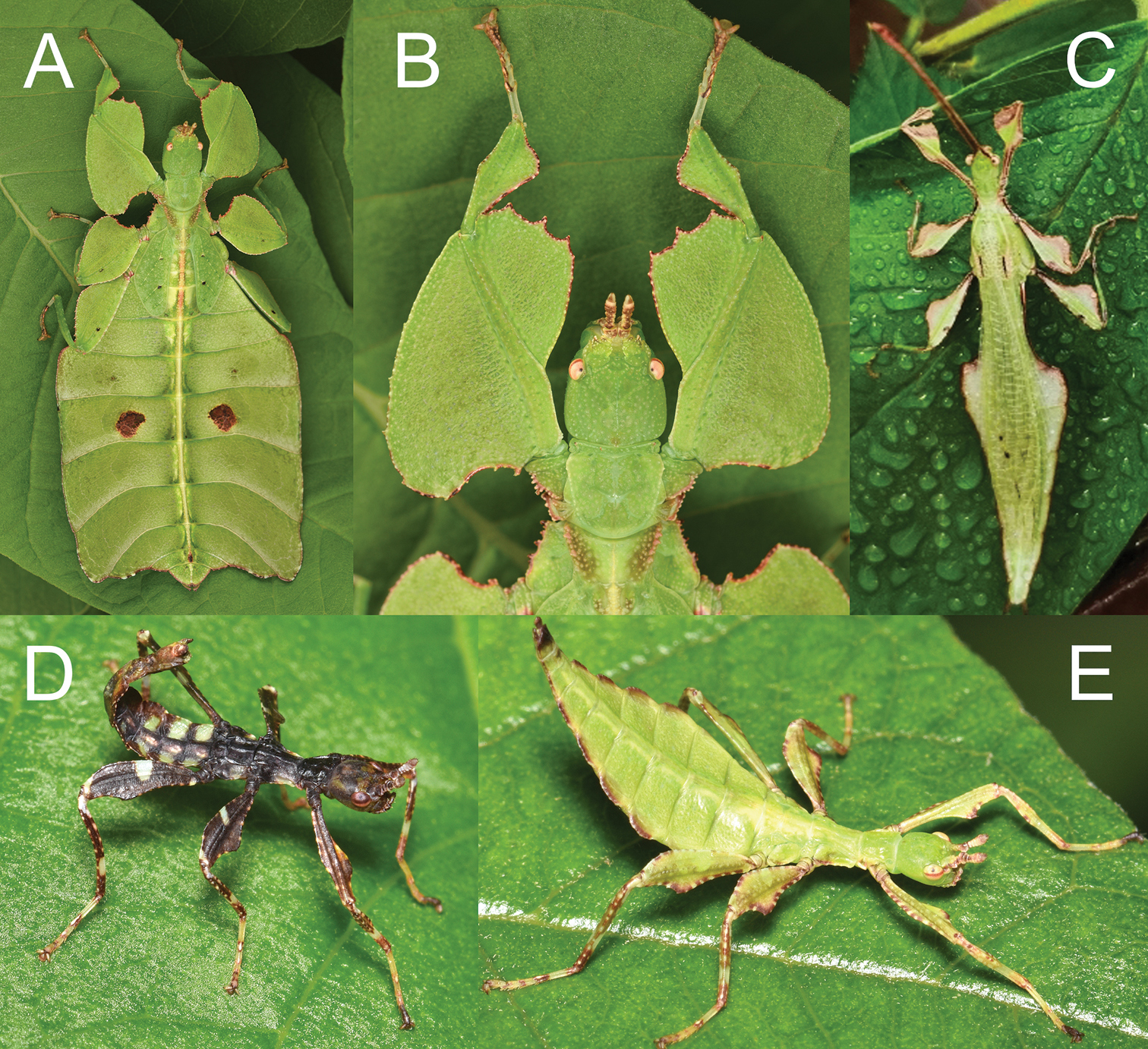
Nanophyllium asekiense during the breed in Montreal Insectarium

== Terraristics ==
The only Nanophyllium species briefly bred to date for a short time was Nanophyllium asekiense. This culture originated from 13 freshly laid eggs, which the Montreal Insectarium received in April 2018 from Morobe Province in Papua New Guinea at the initiative of Le Tirant, the then-curator of the scientific collections at the Montreal Insectarium. Of the five nymphs that hatched from the eggs within seven to eleven months, only three accepted food. Of the three food plant species offered, Psidium guajava (guava), bramble, and Gaultheria shallon (salal), only bramble was accepted. The three nymphs turned out to be one female and two males and were successfully reared. However, the males, which had previously reached adulthood, died before the females became adults. Of the 245 eggs laid by this female, only a few nymphs hatched, all of which refused to feed, so the breeding attempt failed.
