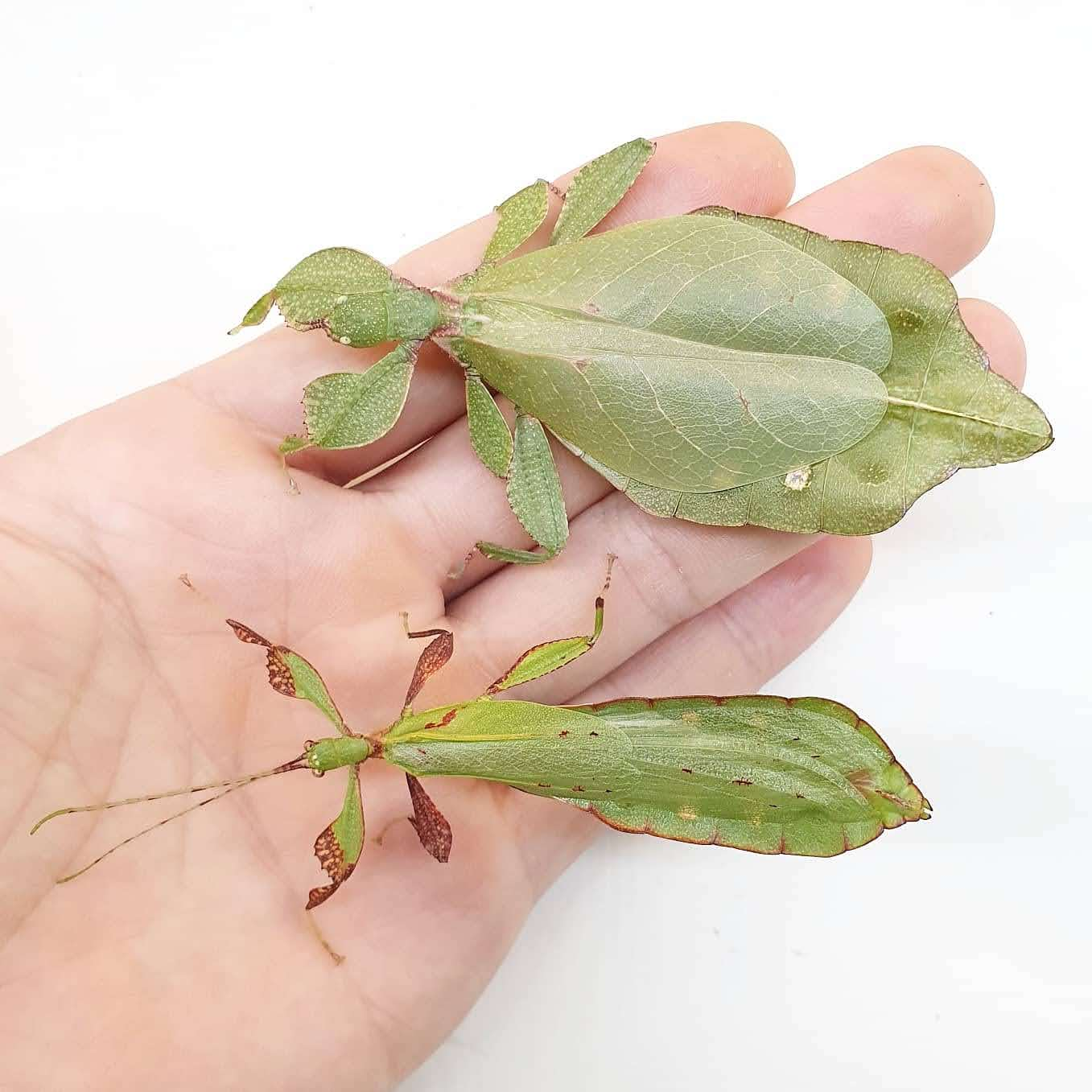
- Pair of Walaphyllium monteithi

Scientific classification
- Kingdom: Animalia
- Phylum: Arthropoda
- Clade: Pancrustacea
- Class: Insecta
- Order: Phasmatodea
- Superfamily: Phyllioidea
- Family: Phylliidae
- Tribe: Phylliini
- Genus: Walaphyllium; Cumming, Thurman, Youngdale & Le Tirant, 2020

Type species
- Walaphyllium zomproi (Grösser, 2001)

Species
- Walaphyllium lelantos; Walaphyllium monteithi; Walaphyllium zomproi

= Walaphyllium =

Genus of stick insects

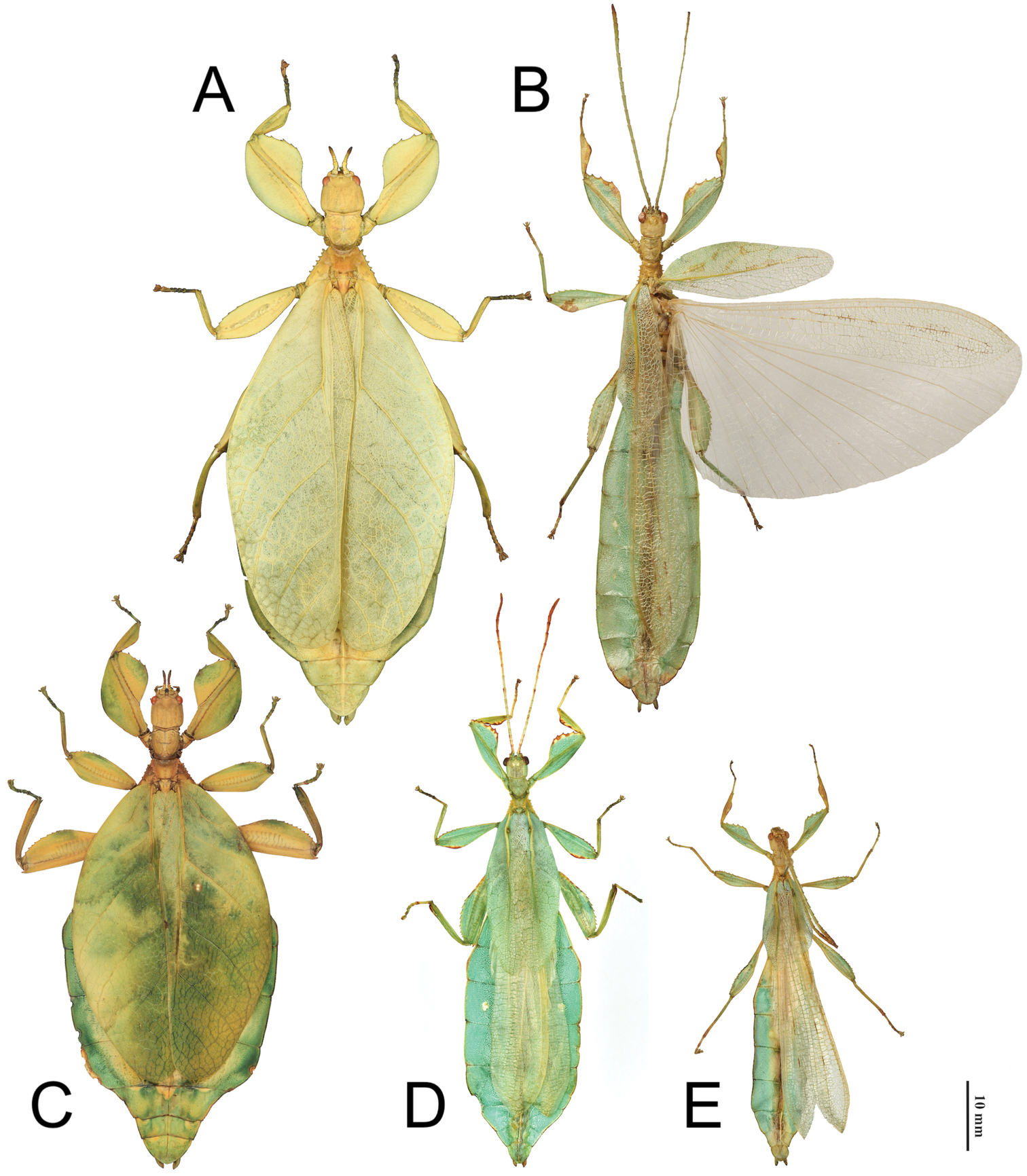
A female and B male of Walaphyllium zomproi, C female and D male of Walaphyllium monteithi, E male holotype of Walaphyllium lelantos

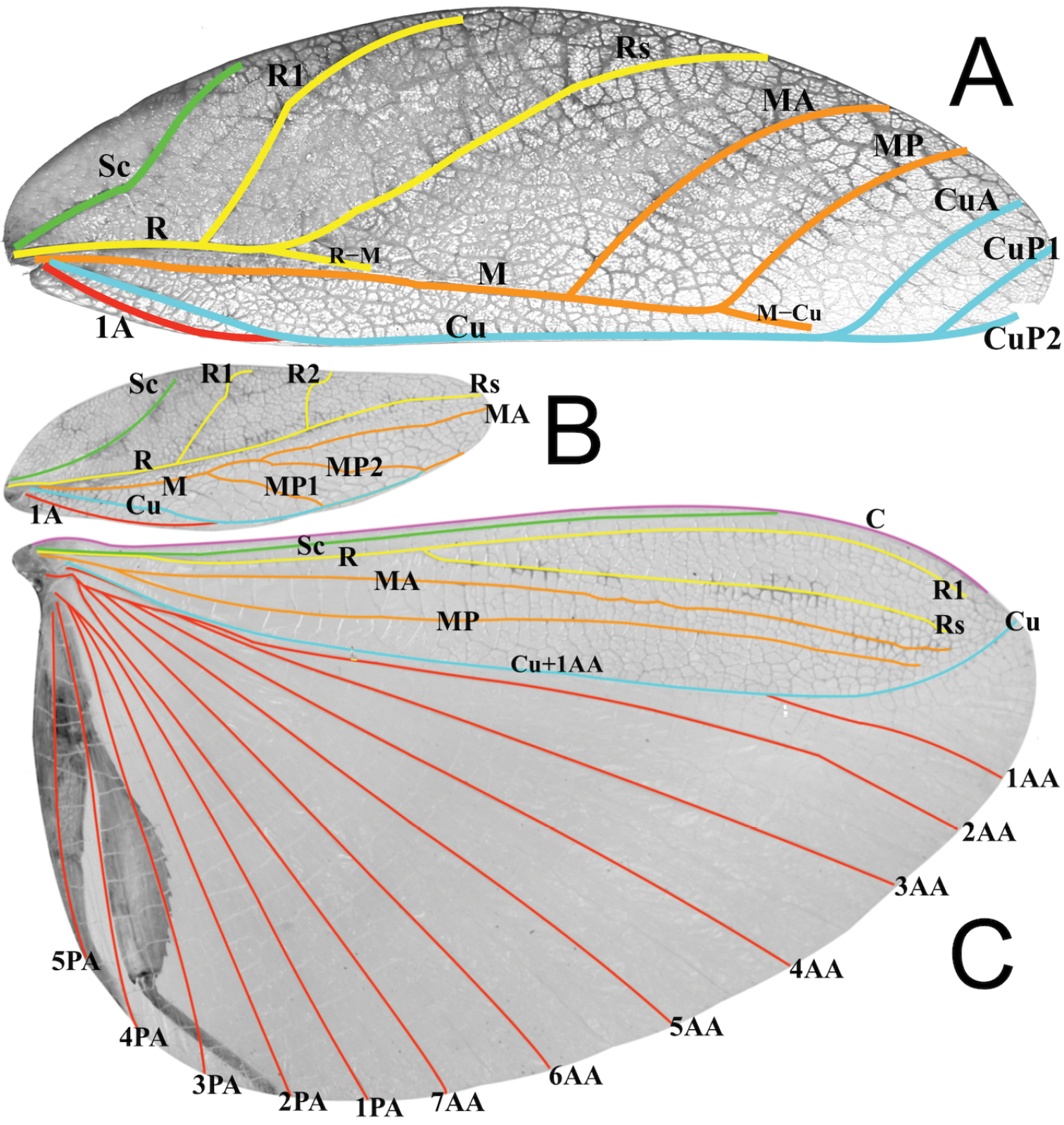
Wing venation of Walaphyllium zomproi: A female forewing, B male fore- and C hindwing

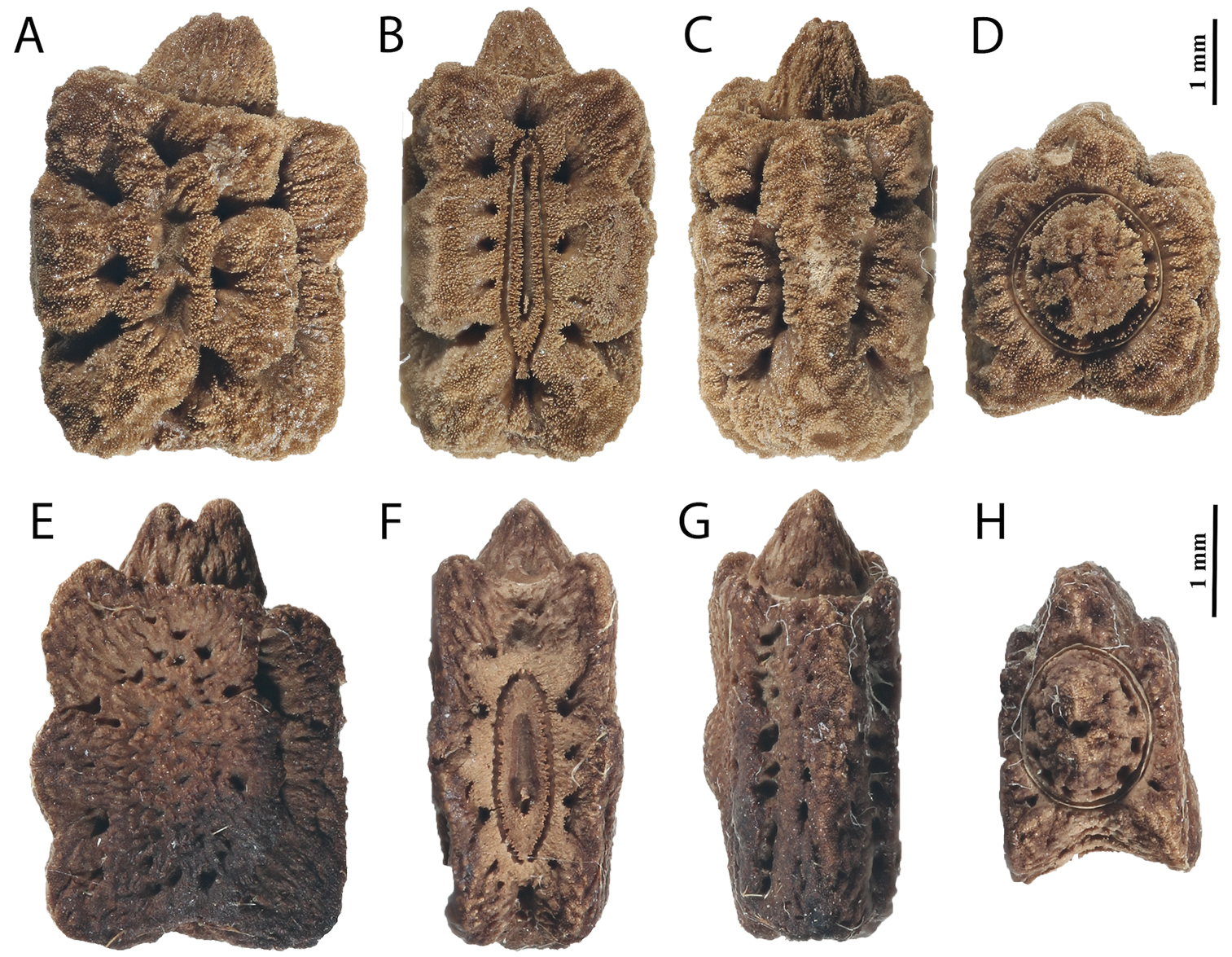
A–D Eggs of Walaphyllium zomproi: A lateral, B dorsal, C ventral, D opercular (anterior); E–H Eggs of Walaphyllium monteithi: E lateral, F dorsal, G ventral, H opercular

Walaphyllium is a genus of stick insect, belonging to the Phylliidae (leaf insects). It was initially described in 2020 as a subgenus of Phyllium, and is native to northeastern Australia and Papua New Guinea.

== Description ==
Walaphyllium species are small to medium-sized representatives of leaf insect. Males of the two larger species reach body lengths of 61 to 79 millimetres (2.4 to 3.1 in). The smallest species, Walaphyllium lelantos, known only from the male holotype, is only about 53 millimetres (2.1 in) long. Females of the two larger species have been documented with body lengths of 75 to 86 millimetres (3.0 to 3.4 in).

A characteristic feature of male Walaphyllium is the structure of the median vein in their forewings (tegmina). This consists of an anterior median vein (MA) and two posterior median veins (MP1 and MP2). The vomer, a movable sclerite located on the tenth tergum of the male abdomen and used for anchoring to the seventh sternum of the female abdomen, is characteristically shaped in many stick insects. In Walaphyllium, it has a single apical hook. The venation of the female tegmina is characterized by the division of the cubitus into an anterior (CuA), a first posterior (CuP1), and a second posterior (CuP2) branch. Hindwings (alae) are not developed in females. The fourth segment (antennomere IV) of their antennae is about as long as the following segment individually, and not short and disc-shaped. The eggs lack pinnae, but have a brittle, spongy surface and a cone-shaped, raised lid (operculum).

Other characteristics of Walaphyllium that are not typical for the genus include the well-developed ocelli (simple eyes) in males. Both sexes possess lobes on the inner edge of the tibae of the forelegs (interior protibial lobes), but lack protibial exterior lobes on the outer edge. The inner lobes on the femora of the forelegs (profemoral interior lobes) each have four to five small, isolated teeth. Five to seven well-developed, but not large, tubercles are present on the pleura of the mesothorax, and these tubercles are almost uniform in size along their entire length. The abdominal margins are parallel in males and nearly parallel in females.

== Occurrence and way of life ==
The known distribution of the genus Walaphyllium currently encompasses northeastern Australia and Papua New Guinea. Walaphyllium monteithi, along with Nanophyllium australianum, is the only leaf insect species described from Australia and, like Nanophyllium australianum, is endemic to Queensland. It is considered relatively common there. The other two Walaphyllium species are native to Papua New Guinea. The location of the only known specimen of Walaphyllium lelantos is Watut in the Morobe Province. Walaphyllium zomproi has also been found in the Morobe Province, as well as in the Gulf Province. Myrtaceae species such as Syzygium smithii are considered natural food plants of Walaphyllium monteithi.

== Taxonomy ==
As early as 2009, Frank H. Hennemann et al. proposed the division of Phyllium and its then-existing subgenera into species groups. The species described in 2001 by Detlef Größer as Phyllium (Phyllium) zomproi, as well as those described in 2003 by Paul D. Brock and Jack Hasenpusch as Phyllium (Phyllium) monteithi, were placed at that time, together with 15 other species, in the siccifolium species group. Of these, 12 species remain in the genus Phyllium, while the remaining four species have been transferred to three subsequently described genera. Phyllium zomproi was transferred in June 2020 by Royce T. Cumming, Jessa H. Thurman, Sam Youngdale, and Stéphane Le Tirant as the type species to Walaphyllium, which was described as a subgenus of Phyllium. The present-day Walaphyllium monteithi was also transferred to this subgenus as the second species of the former genus Phyllium. At the same time, Cumming, Thurman, Youngdale and Le Tirant described a third species in this subgenus, Phyllium (Walaphyllium) lelantos, based on a male specimen collected in 1992 and deposited in the Natural History Museum, London.

The name "Walaphyllium" means "dancing leaf" and is composed of the Latinized name Phyllium, the type genus of the family (from the Greek φυλλον, -ου (phyllon, -oy)), and the prefix "Wala", which is borrowed from the languages of the Indigenous peoples of Australia. "Walawalay" means "shaking dance" in the Dyirbal language and "walayi-y" means "to pass by" in the Djagubay language. The overlapping terms from these indigenous languages are used, among other places, in the far north of Queensland, the distribution area of Walaphyllium monteithi. Since this species is the most common and best-known of the subgenus at that time, the authors assume that the indigenous peoples of this region may have been the first to appreciate this mysterious insect and take the opportunity to show respect to these peoples by naming it after them. Like Phyllium, Walaphyllium is also neuter.

Sarah Bank et al. elevated Walaphyllium and two other subgenera of Phyllium to genera in 2021 based on their molecular genetic studies. The studies included one sample each of Walaphyllium zomproi and Walaphyllium monteithi.

The genus Walaphyllium currently comprises the following species:

- Walaphyllium lelantos (Cumming, Youngdale, Thurman & Le Tirant, 2020)
- Walaphyllium monteithi (Brock & Hasenpusch, 2003)
- Walaphyllium zomproi (Grösser, 2001)

Cumming and Le Tirant classified the genus 2022 phylogenetically according to molecular genetic and morphological characteristics using Bayesian inference and placed it in a clade with Comptaphyllium, Acentetaphyllium, Nanophyllium, and Trolicaphyllium, making it the sister taxon to all other genera (see also Cladogram of the Phylliidae).

== Terraristics ==
From the genus Walaphyllium, Walaphyllium monteithi has been bred in captivity for many years in both Australia and Europe. It accepts bramble, salal, Psidium, Eucalyptus melanophloia, and Hypericum grandifolium, as food plants.
