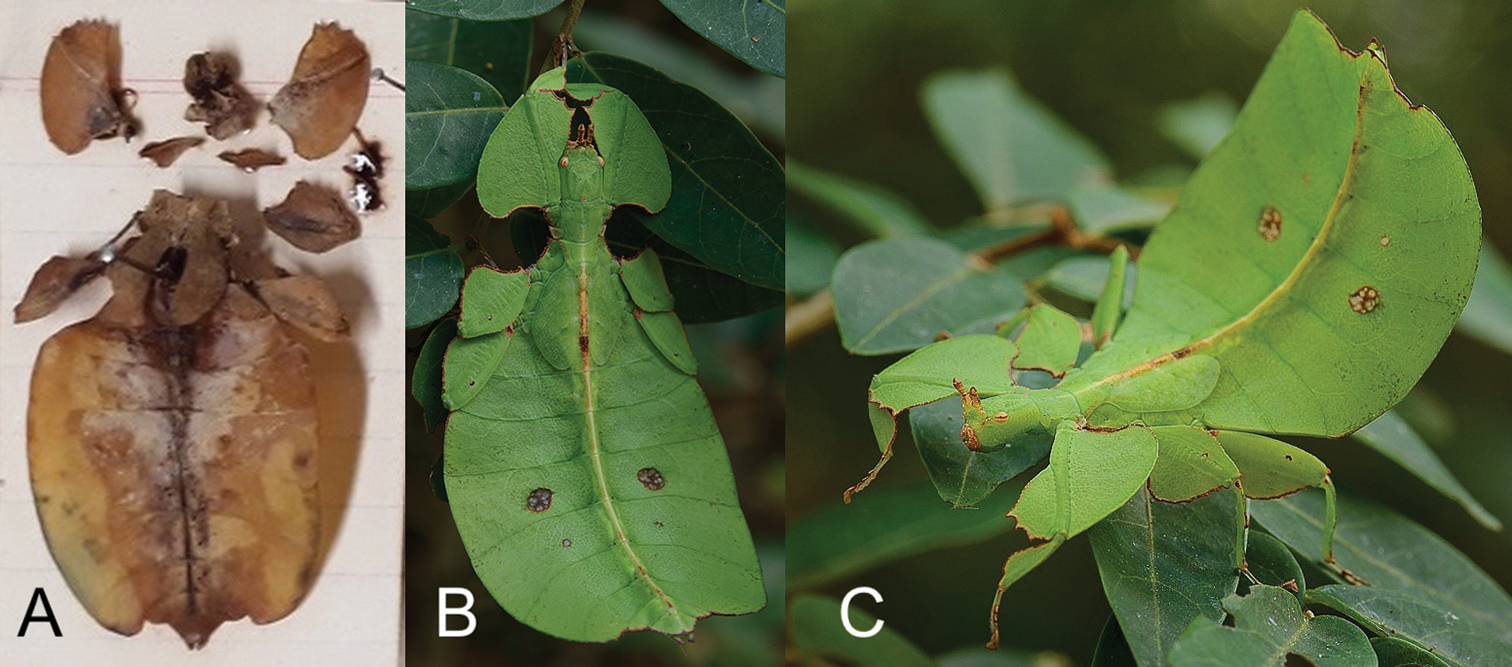
- Nanophyllium australianum ♀

Scientific classification
- Domain: Eukaryota
- Kingdom: Animalia
- Phylum: Arthropoda
- Class: Insecta
- Order: Phasmatodea
- Family: Phylliidae
- Genus: Nanophyllium
- Species: N. australianum

Binomial name
- Nanophyllium australianum Cumming, Le Tirant & Teemsma, 2018

= Nanophyllium australianum =

Queensland leaf insect

Species of insect

Nanophyllium australianum, also known as the Queensland leaf insect, is a species of leaf insect found in the Iron Range in Northern Queensland.

The type specimen for this species was discovered in 1906. It was suggested that it was a variety of Nanophyllium pygmaeum, a species native to Papua New Guinea; however, it is now recognised as Nanophyllium australianum. Phyllium monteithei is the second species of Australian native leaf insect, other than Nanophyllium australianum. As with many species of Nanophyllium, only males were discovered, which explains the enigmatic and elusive nature of these species.

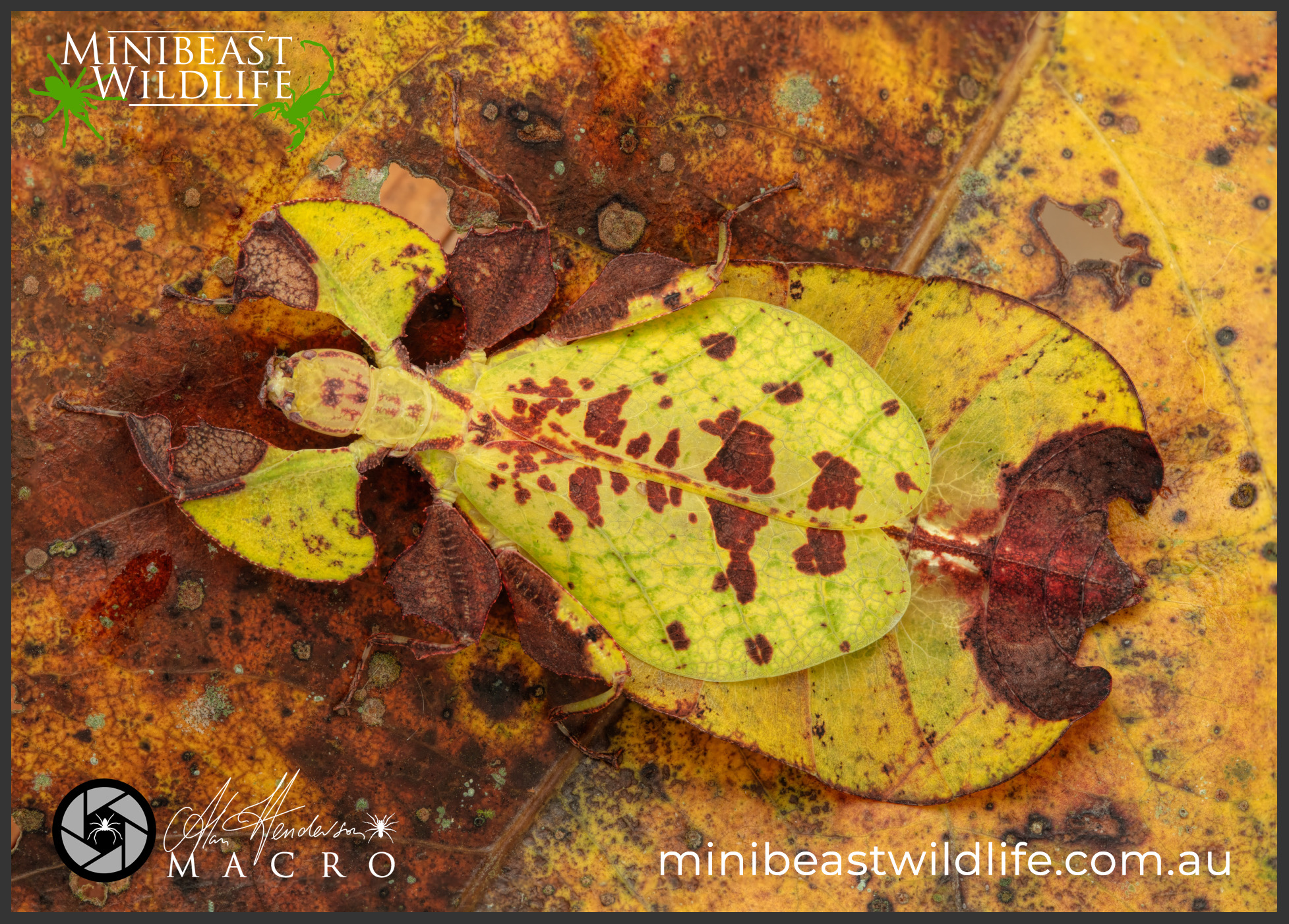
Nanophyllium Australianum female adult yellow form

There is a limited amount of information available regarding this species. In 2023, Minibeast wildlife received a donation of a female Nanophyllium australianum from the Iron Range. The female laid eggs, and they have successfully hatched. Additionally, in 1986, a male nymph was collected near Mount Tozer, and taken to Canberra. It was kept alive by feeding on pyracantha.

Males appear black in colour, mimicking certain wasp species. Females appear a greenish colour, however this can change depending on the colour of their surroundings.

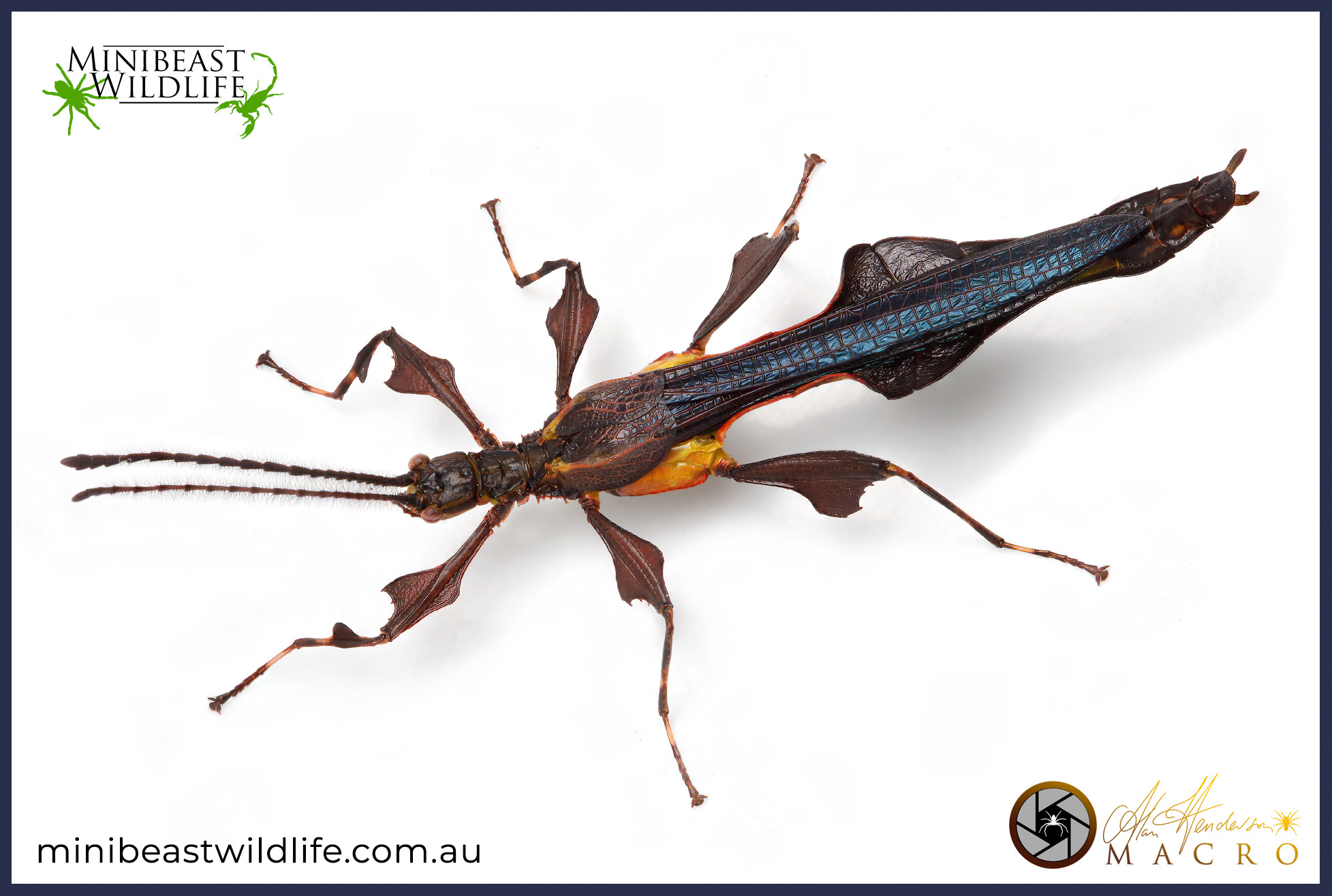
Nanophyllium Australianum adult male

== Diet ==
This species is known to feed on Cape ironwood and Pyracantha.
