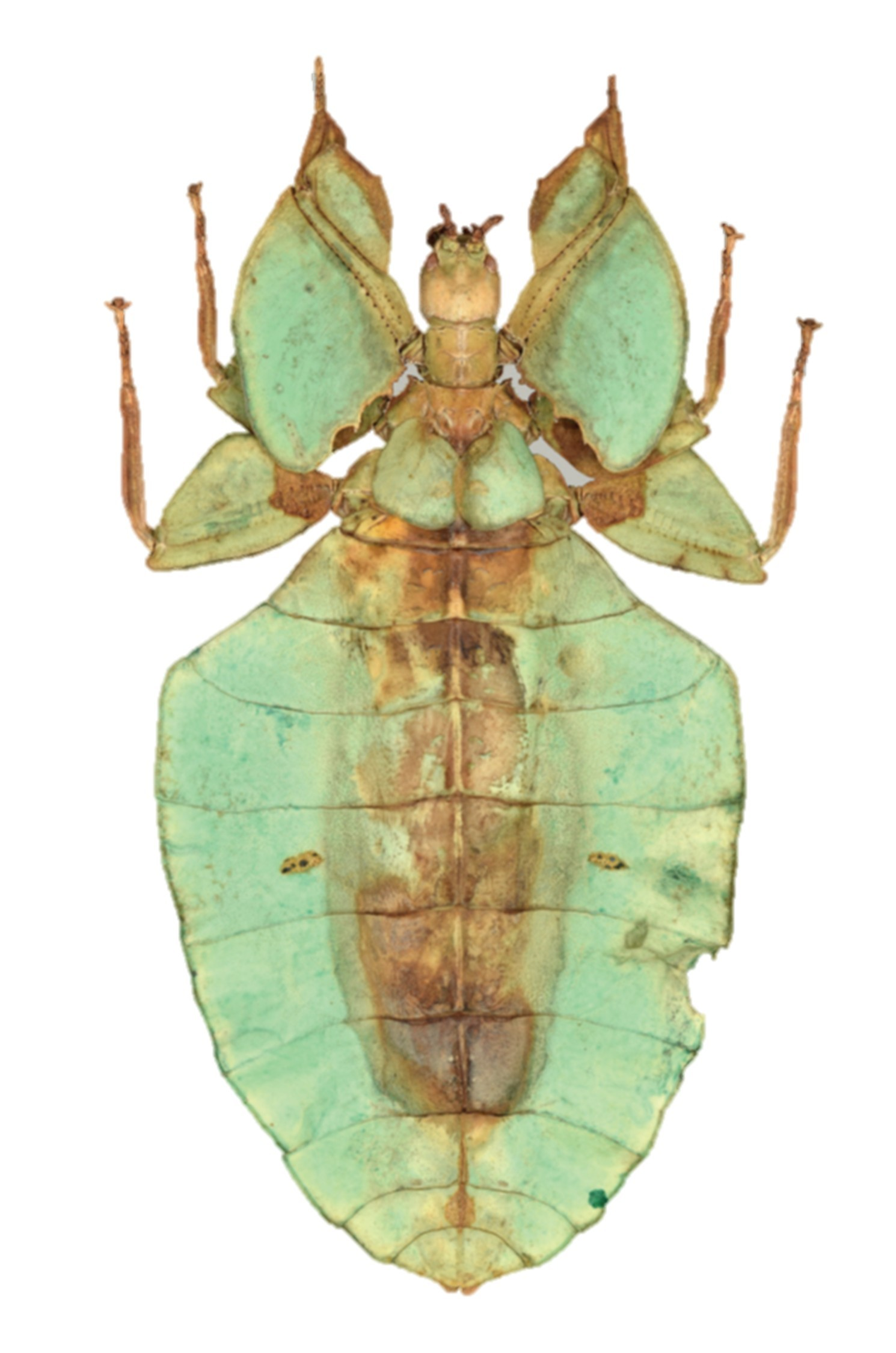
- Female of Acentetaphyllium brevipenne

Scientific classification
- Kingdom: Animalia
- Phylum: Arthropoda
- Class: Insecta
- Order: Phasmatodea
- Family: Phylliidae
- Genus: Acentetaphyllium
- Species: A. brevipenne

Binomial name
- Acentetaphyllium brevipenne (Grösser, 1992)

Synonyms
- Phyllium brevipennis Grösser, 1992; Nanohyllium brevipennis (Grösser, 1992)

= Acentetaphyllium brevipenne =

Species of leaf insect

Acentetaphyllium brevipenne, is a species of stick insect belonging to the Phylliidae (leaf insects). It is found in New Guinea, and Sri Lanka.
