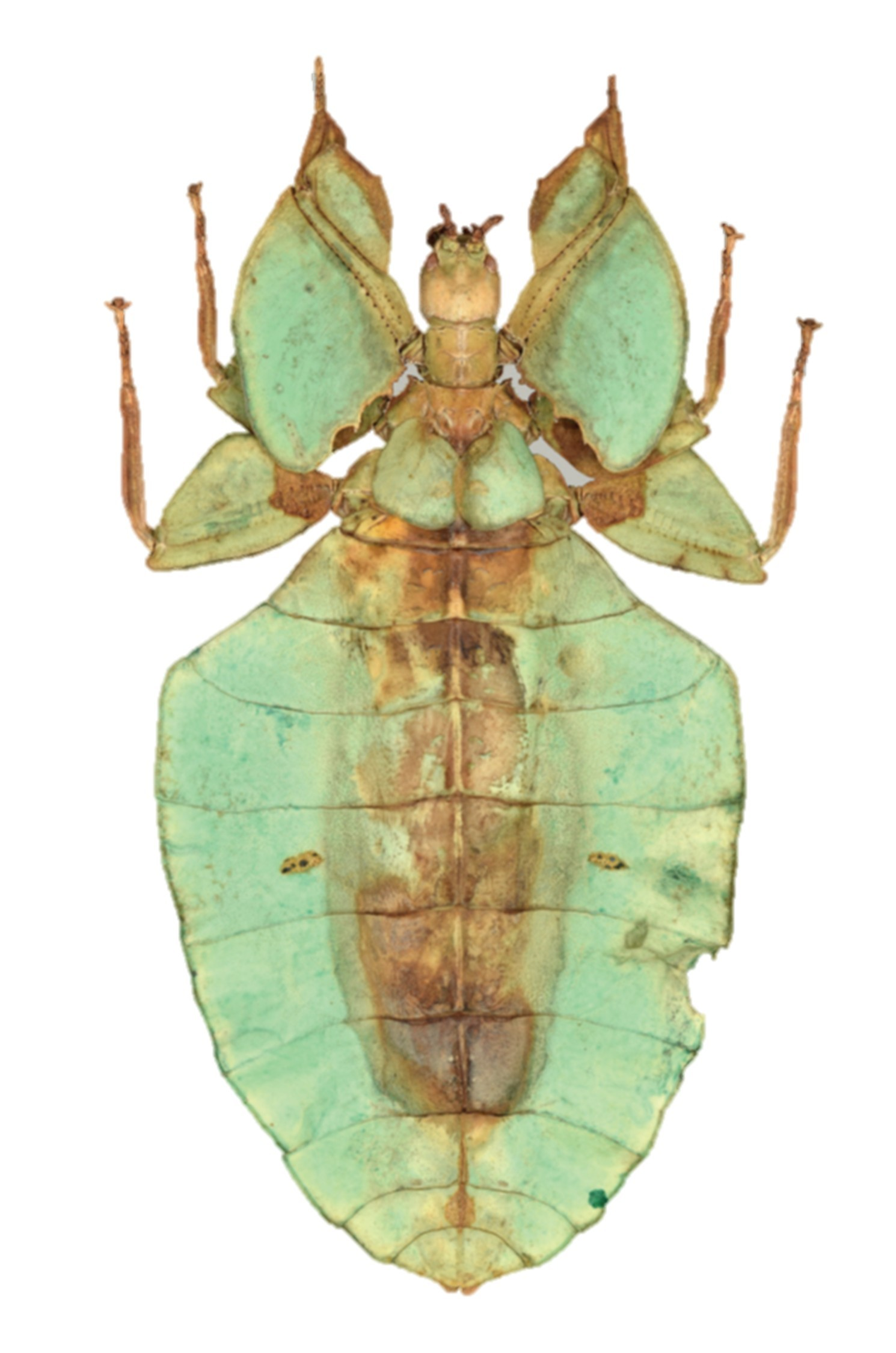
- Female of Acentetaphyllium brevipenne

Scientific classification
- Kingdom: Animalia
- Phylum: Arthropoda
- Clade: Pancrustacea
- Class: Insecta
- Order: Phasmatodea
- Superfamily: Phyllioidea
- Family: Phylliidae
- Tribe: Nanophylliini
- Genus: Acentetaphyllium; Cumming & Le Tirant, 2022

Type species
- Acentetaphyllium brevipenne (Grösser, 1992)

Species
- Acentetaphyllium brevipenne; Acentetaphyllium larssoni; Acentetaphyllium miyashitai; Acentetaphyllium stellae

= Acentetaphyllium =

Genus of stick insects

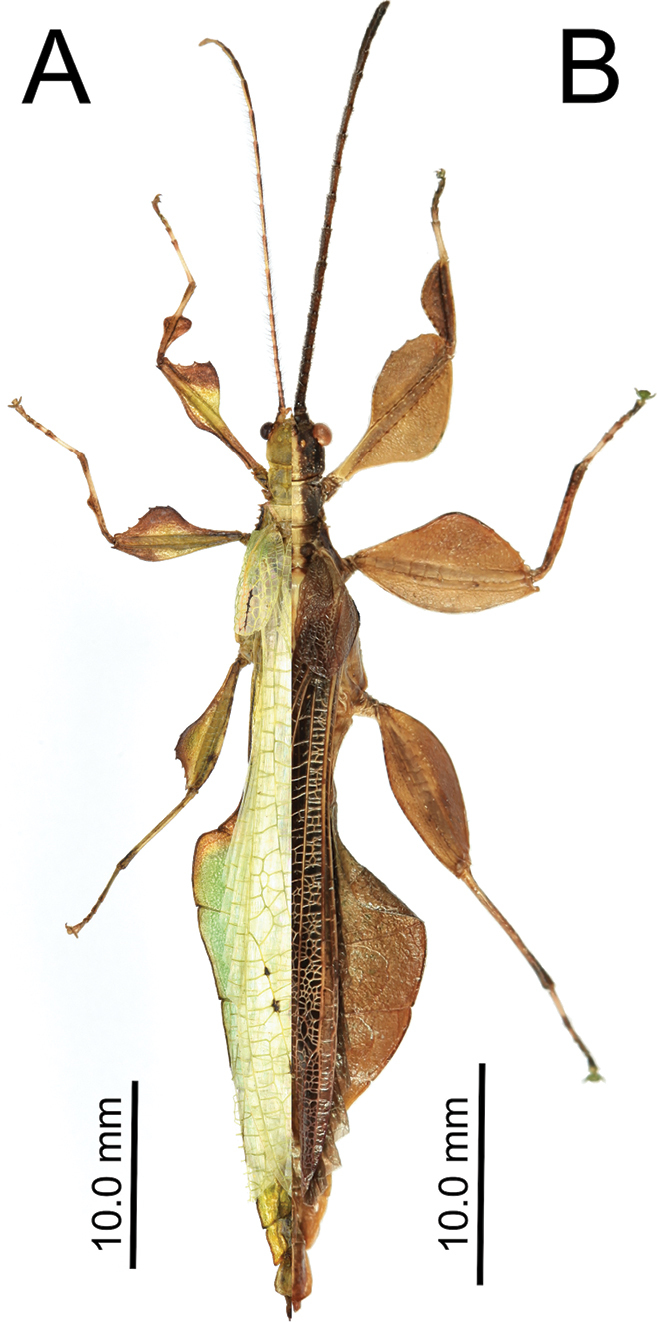
Half-side comparison of the males of A Nanophyllium asekiense and B Acentetaphyllium stellae

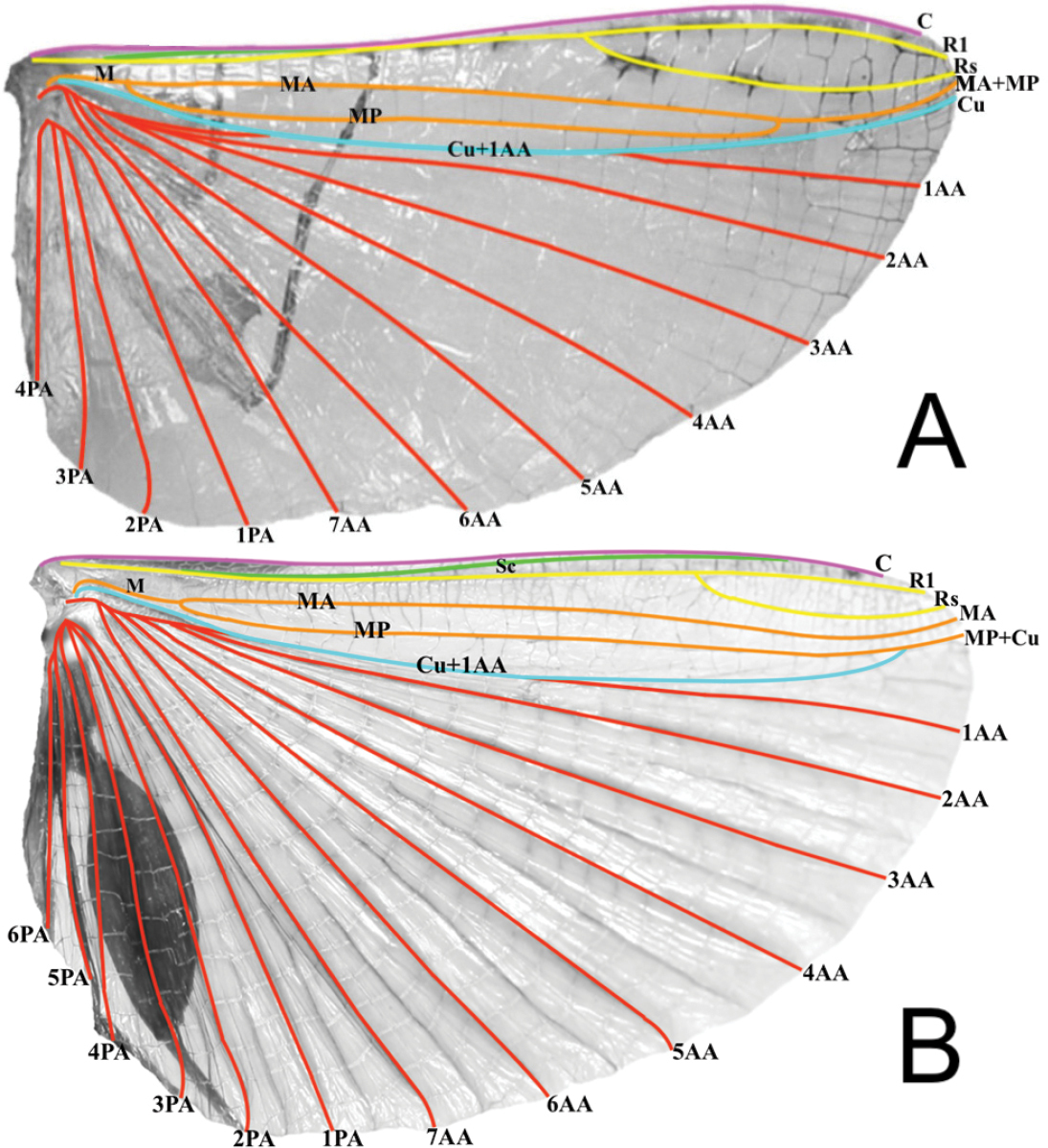
Comparison of the venation of the hindwings (alae) of males of A Nanophyllium rentzi and B Acentetaphyllium stellae

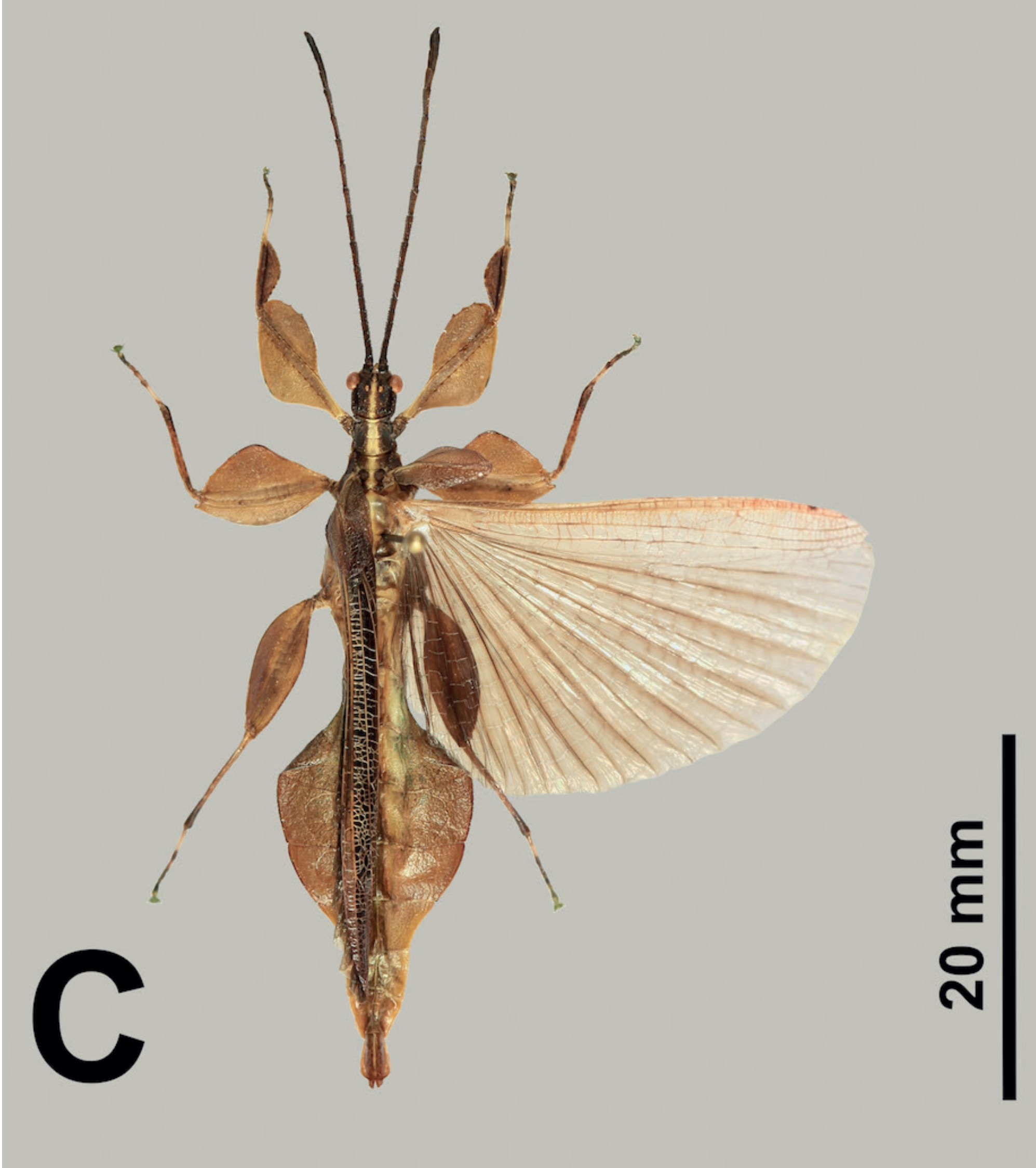
Acentetaphyllium stellae, male holotype

Acentetaphyllium is a genus of stick insect described in 2022, belonging to the Phylliidae (leaf insects), and native to New Guinea. The species in this genus were previously classified in the genus Nanophyllium until 2022.

== Description ==
Females of the genus Acentetaphyllium are currently only known from Acentetaphyllium brevipenne. For all other species, only the males have been described. While the females reach a body length of 78 to 80 millimetres (3.1 to 3.1 in), the males remain significantly smaller at approximately 40 millimetres (1.6 in). This results in a length ratio of 1:2 between males and females. For all other leaf insects, this ratio ranges from 1:1.2 to 1:1.6. While only brown-colored male Acentetaphyllium specimens are known to date, the coloration of the females varies. They exhibit yellow, yellowish-green, and light to dark brown hues. Their abdomen has a maximum width of 42 millimetres (1.7 in).

The forewings (tegmina) are markedly shortened and strongly sclerotised in both sexes. Their length reaches at most the anterior margin of the second abdominal segment, but is usually shorter, extending only to the metanotum. Such short tegmina in females are unique among leaf insects. Hindwings (alae) are absent in females, while they are fully developed in males and extend to the ninth or tenth abdominal segment.

Both sexes have lobes on the inner side of the tibae of the forelegs (interior protibial lobes), which extend along their entire length in a broadly rounded triangle. There are no lobes on the outer edges of the forelegs, nor on the tibiae of the mid and hind legs. In both sexes, the lobe on the inner edge of the femur of the forelegs is rounded and significantly smaller than the lobe on the outer surface, which is characterized by a pronounced angle. The inner femoral lobes of the mid and hind legs are approximately 1.5 to 2 times as wide as the outer lobes in both sexes. Both curve gently, giving them a smooth, tapered, leaf-like appearance that fits snugly against the front part of the abdomen, thus contributing to the egg-shaped habitus of the animals.

The abdomen of females is often perfectly spatulate. In some females, the abdominal segments may have slightly wavy edges, giving the abdomen a similar appearance. The abdomen of males can also be uniformly spatulate or strongly wavy, as in Acentetaphyllium larssoni.

The autapomorphic characteristics of the genus are considered to be the strongly sclerotised and extremely shortened forewings in females, which in all other female leave insects extend at least to half the abdomen. In males, the arrangement and expression of certain longitudinal veins in the hindwings are considered an autapomorphic character. In these males, the anterior media (MA) and posterior media (MP) do not fuse before the wing margin. Instead, the anterior media runs alone to the wing margin, while the posterior media joins the cubital vein before the wing tip. In males of Nanophyllium species, the anterior and posterior media fuse again before the wing margin, while the cubital vein runs freely to the wing margin.

== Occurrence and Way of life ==
The distribution area of the genus Acentetaphyllium encompasses the entire island of New Guinea. The few precisely known locations are limited to northern New Guinea, specifically in the Cyclops Mountains in Papua Province on the Indonesian side of the island, as well as in the Bewani Mountains in Sandaun Province and the Finisterre Mountains in Madang Province in northern and northwestern Papua New Guinea, respectively, and in Morobe Province to the west. A further observation of a female of an either undescribed or unidentified Acentetaphyllium species comes from the Fakfak Mountains in Indonesia. Two locations are known to be at altitudes of 750 and 1,200 metres (2,460 and 3,940 ft), respectively. Little is known about their lifestyle. According to collection labels of two female Acentetaphyllium brevipenne specimens, these were found on eucalyptus trees.

== Taxonomy ==
As early as 2009, Frank H. Hennemann et al. proposed the division of Phyllium and its then-existing subgenera into species groups. For the species described by Detlef Größer in 1992 as Phyllium (Phyllium) brevipennis, they established the then monotypic Brevipenne species group. The species, known only from females, has been placed in the genus Nanophyllium since 2021. Royce T. Cumming and Stéphane Le Tirant transferred it as the type species to their newly established genus Acentetaphyllium in 2022. At the same time, three further Nanophyllium species, known only from their males and described between 2016 and 2020, were transferred to this genus. Already in 2020, these were distinguished from the remaining Nanophyllium species (pygmaeum species group) within the stellae species group as part of a study on the genus Nanophyllium, in which Acentetaphyllium miyashitai was described.

The name "Acentetaphyllium" means "flawless leaf" and is composed of the Latinized name Phyllium, the type genus of the family (from the Greek φυλλον, -ου (phyllon, -oy)), and the Latin prefix "acenteta," meaning "flawless." It refers to the most remarkable characteristic of this genus: its ability to form a perfect, oval leaf shape when at rest, made possible by the shape of its abdomen and legs. Like Phyllium, Acentetaphyllium is also neuter.

The genus Acentetaphyllium currently comprises the following species:

- Acentetaphyllium brevipenne (Grösser, 1992)
- Acentetaphyllium larssoni (Cumming, 2017)
- Acentetaphyllium miyashitai (Cumming, Le Tirant, Teemsma, Hennemann, Willemse & Büscher, 2020)
- Acentetaphyllium stellae (Cumming, 2016)

Cumming and Le Tirant justify the separation of the genus Acentetaphyllium from Nanophyllium with molecular genetic differences. These differences were already demonstrated in a previous study in which, in addition to a sample of Acentetaphyllium brevipenne, samples from five Nanophyllium species were also examined. The phylogenetic classification of the genus shows that it is the sister group to Nanophyllium (see also Cladogram of the Phylliidae). Females of Acentetaphyllium brevipenne and males of the three other Acentetaphyllium species were included in the morphological analysis.
