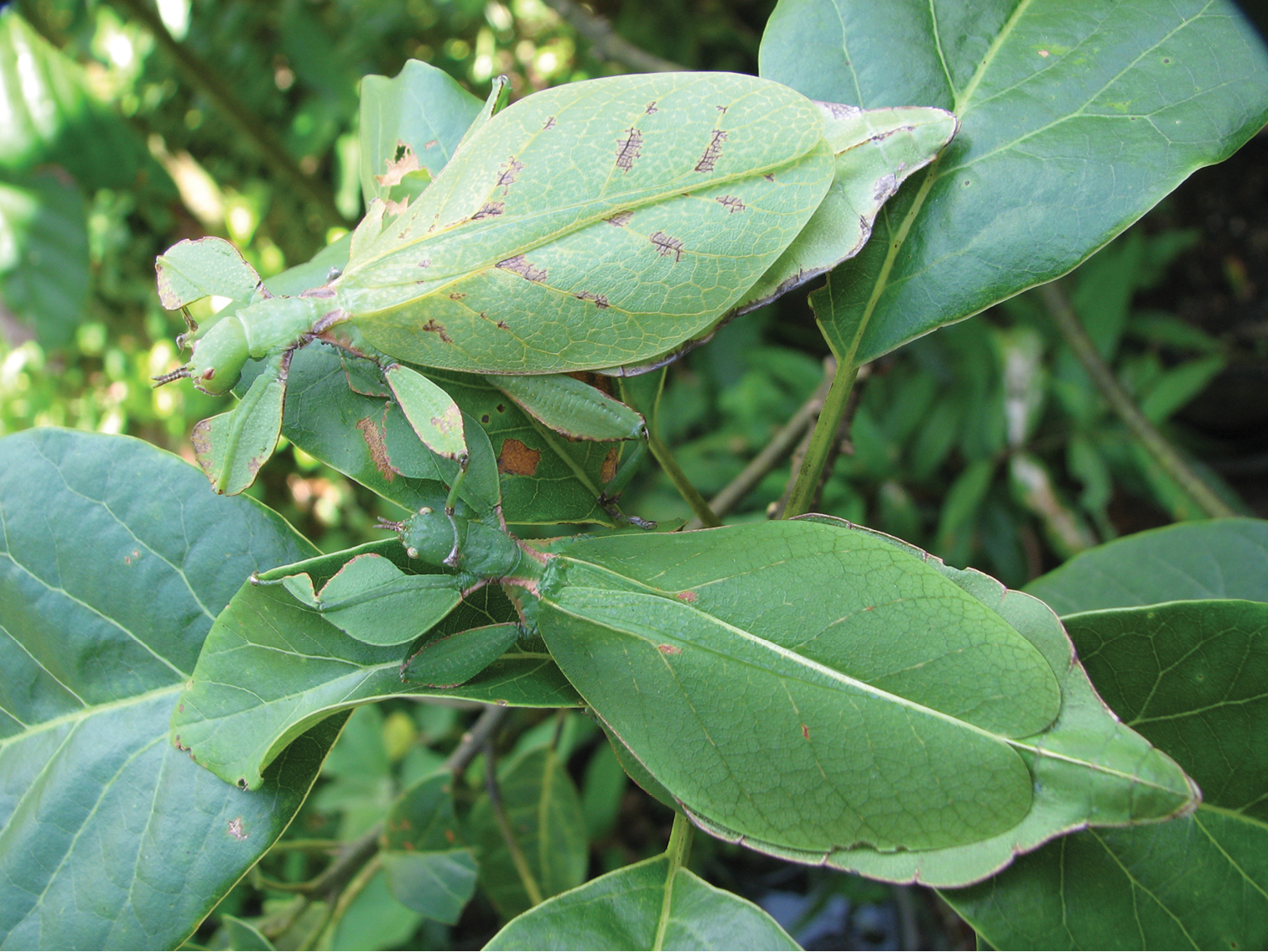
- Captive bred females from Innisfail, Queensland

Scientific classification
- Kingdom: Animalia
- Phylum: Arthropoda
- Clade: Pancrustacea
- Class: Insecta
- Order: Phasmatodea
- Family: Phylliidae
- Genus: Walaphyllium
- Species: W. monteithi

Binomial name
- Walaphyllium monteithi Brock & Hasenpusch, 2003

Synonyms
- Phyllium monteithi

= Walaphyllium monteithi =

Monteith's leaf-insect

Species of leaf insect

Walaphyllium monteithi (formerly Phyllium monteithei) is a species of phasmatodea (leaf insect) in the family Phylliidae. P. monteithi is found in tropical Queensland in Australia. The type specimen was collected from Mount Lewis, near Julatten. Reproduction occurs through parthenogenesis and conventional mating.

== Range ==
Walaphyllium monteithi inhabits areas with dense foliage, where it can blend in with leaves to avoid predation. The species is native to the rainforests of Far North Queensland. Known areas include: Cairns (mainly Kuranda, one sighting in Redlynch), Garradunga, Mount Hypipamee National Park, and Tully Falls National Park(southernmost sighting).

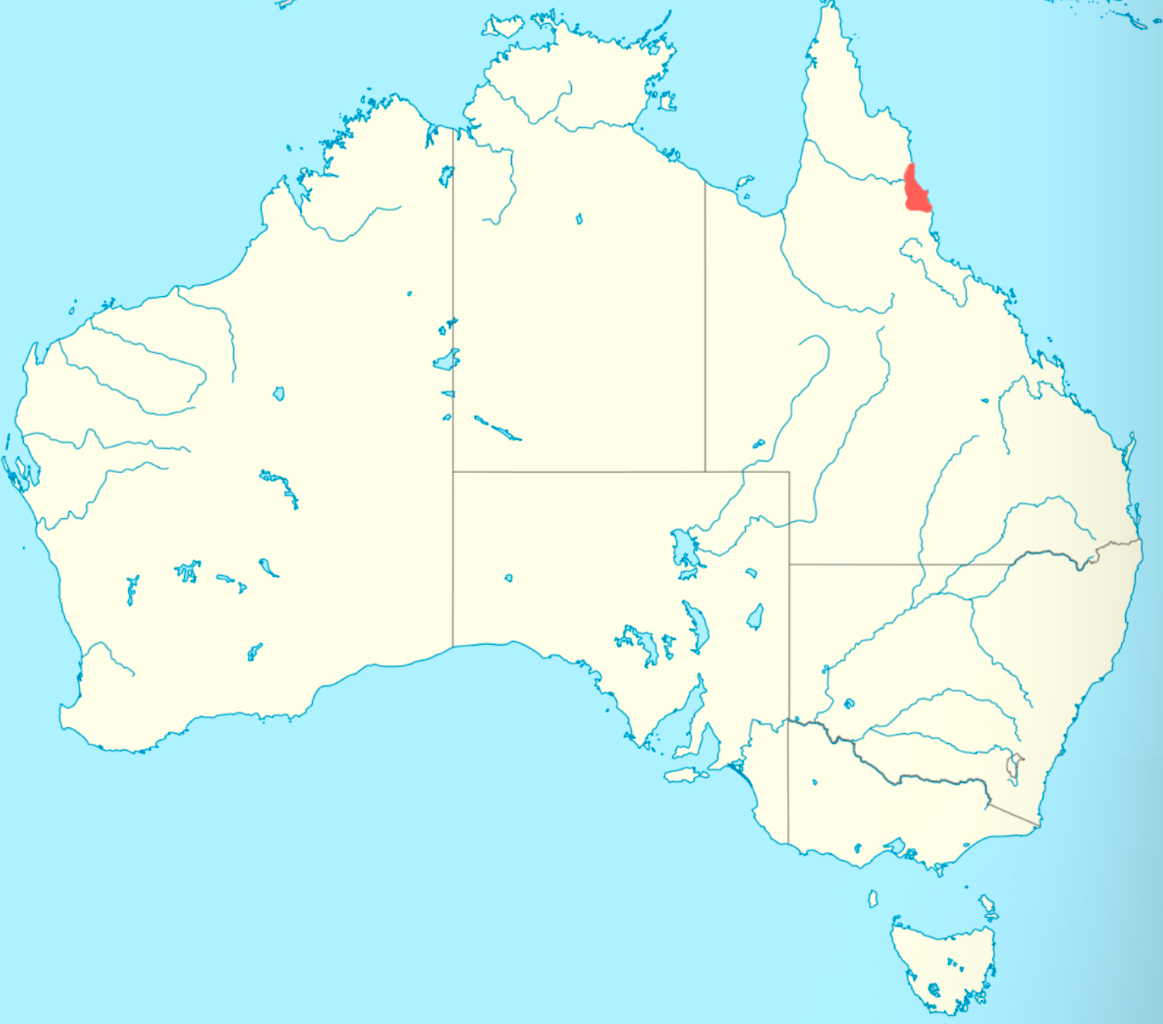
Range of Walaphyllium monteithi (red)

== Description ==
W. monteithi closely resembles a leaf, exhibiting venations.

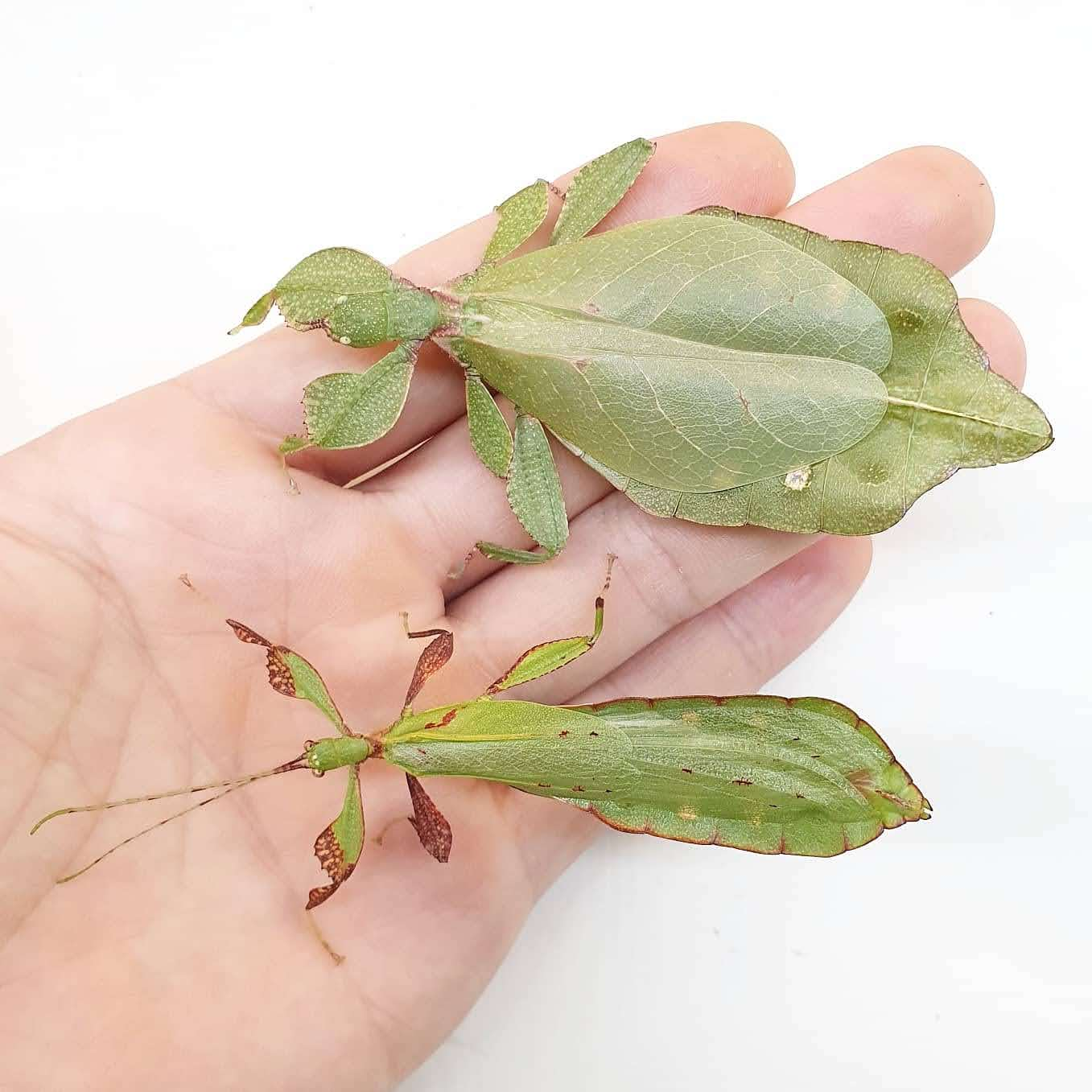
Walaphyllium monteithi female (top) and male (bottom)

This species exhibits sexual dimorphism, with females being larger and more leaf-like than males. Females have broad, flattened bodies that mimic leaves, while males are more slender and have fully developed wings for flight. The coloration of W. monteithi varies from bright green to orange, allowing individuals to match their surroundings. Males are between 61 and 64 mm in length, females to 76 mm.

== Defence ==
Apart from camouflage and mimicry, W.monteithi can employ sudden movements to confuse predators. This includes swaying side to side, mimicking a leaf in the wind to avoid detection. They are also known to release a smell which is noted to resemble “old potatoes”.

== Diet ==
The diet of W. monteithi includes:

- Brush cherry (Syzygium australe)- most commonly food plant in captivity (Australia)
- Common lilly pilly (Syzygium smithii)
- Golden penda (Xanthostemon chrysanthus) - individuals who feed on this are often noted to turn orange/red
- Cape ironwood (Gossia floribunda)
- Guava (Psidium guajava)
- Bramble (Rubus sp.)
- Salal (Gaultheria shallon)
- Eucalyptus (Eucalyptus sp.)
- Hypericum (Hypericum "hidcote")
- Hazelnut (Corylus avellana)
- Rose (Rosa sp.)

== Cultivation ==
W. monteithi is kept by insect enthusiasts and breeders due to its unique appearance and fascinating behaviour. Captive breeding requires a warm and humid environment with suitable host plants. The species needs vertical space for moulting, as improper moulting conditions can lead to deformities.
