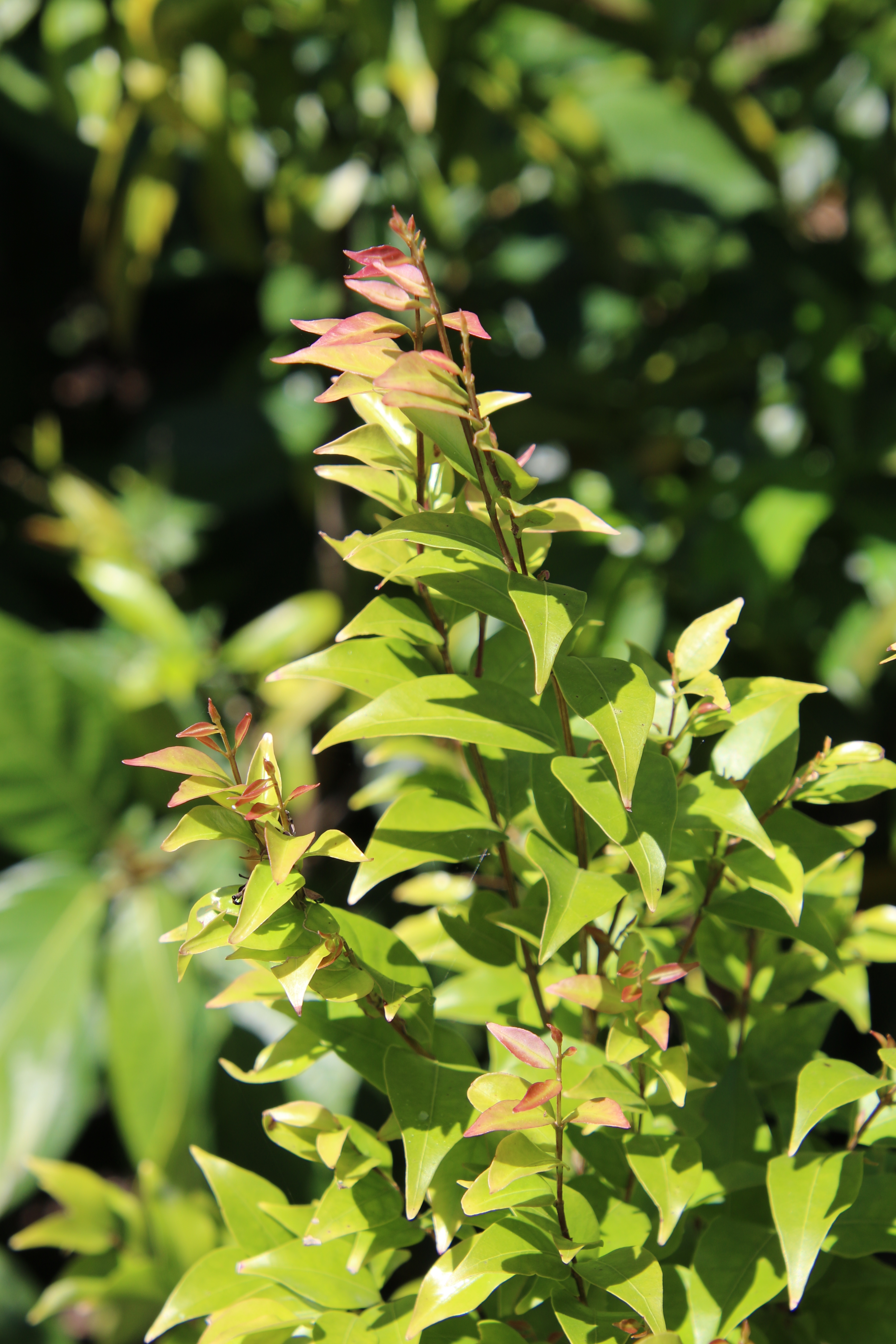
- Royal Botanic Gardens, Sydney

Conservation status
- Least Concern (IUCN 3.1)

Scientific classification
- Kingdom: Plantae
- Clade: Tracheophytes
- Clade: Angiosperms
- Clade: Eudicots
- Clade: Rosids
- Order: Myrtales
- Family: Myrtaceae
- Genus: Gossia
- Species: G. floribunda

Binomial name
- Gossia floribunda (A.J.Scott) N.Snow & Guymer

Synonyms
- Austromyrtus floribunda (A.J.Scott) Guymer; Backhousea floribunda A.J.Scott

= Gossia floribunda =

Cape ironwood

Species of flowering plant

Gossia floribunda or Cape ironwood species of plant in the Myrtaceae family. It is a understorey plant growing to a height of 1 to 6 m (3 ft 3 in to 19 ft 8 in). It is native to the Cape York Peninsula of Queensland in northeastern Australia and to New Guinea. Small white flowers form in abundance.

The IUCN Red List assesses the species as Least Concern.

The species was first described as Backhousia floribunda in 1984 by Andrew John Scott. In 2003 Neil Snow, Gordon Guymer and G. Sawvel re-assigned the species to genus Gossia to give its currently accepted name, Gossia floribunda.
