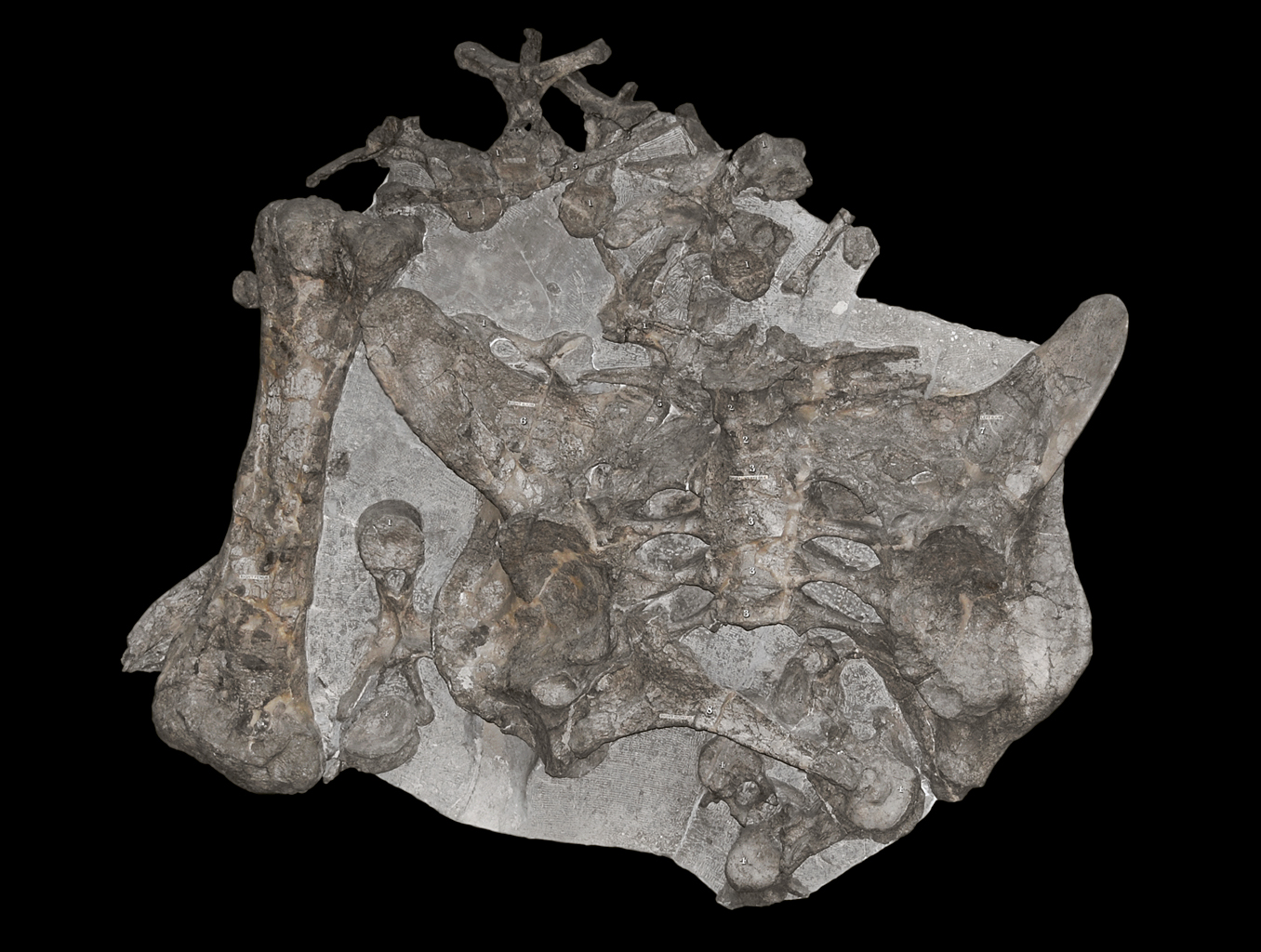
- Holotype specimen (NHMUK PV OR 46013), Natural History Museum, London

Scientific classification
- Kingdom: Animalia
- Phylum: Chordata
- Class: Reptilia
- Clade: Dinosauria
- Clade: †Ornithischia
- Clade: †Thyreophora
- Clade: †Stegosauria
- Family: †Stegosauridae
- Clade: †Neostegosauria
- Subfamily: †Dacentrurinae
- Genus: †Dacentrurus; Lucas, 1902
- Species: †D. armatus

Binomial name
- †Dacentrurus armatus (Owen, 1875 [originally Omosaurus])

Synonyms
- Miragaia longicollum? Mateus et al., 2009; Omosaurus armatus Owen, 1875 (type, preoccupied)

= Dacentrurus =

Dacentrurus Temporal range: Late Jurassic, - Early Cretaceous 154–140 Ma

Extinct species of reptile

Dacentrurus (meaning "tail full of points") is an extinct genus of stegosaurian dinosaur from the Late Jurassic and perhaps Early Cretaceous (154–140 million years ago) of Europe. Its type species, D. armatus, was named in 1875 as Omosaurus armatus, based on a skeleton found in a clay pit in the Kimmeridge Clay in Swindon, England. In 1902 the genus was renamed Dacentrurus because the name Omosaurus had already been used for a phytosaur in 1856. After 1875, half a dozen other species would be named but perhaps only Dacentrurus armatus is valid.

Dacentrurus is among the largest known stegosaurs, measuring around 8–9 metres (26–30 ft) long and weighing up to 5–7.4 metric tons (5.5–8.2 short tons). Finds of this animal have been limited, so much of its appearance is uncertain and its relationship with other members of the Dacentrurinae are contentious. Some researchers suggest that Miragaia longicollum represents a junior synonym of this taxon.

== Discovery and species ==
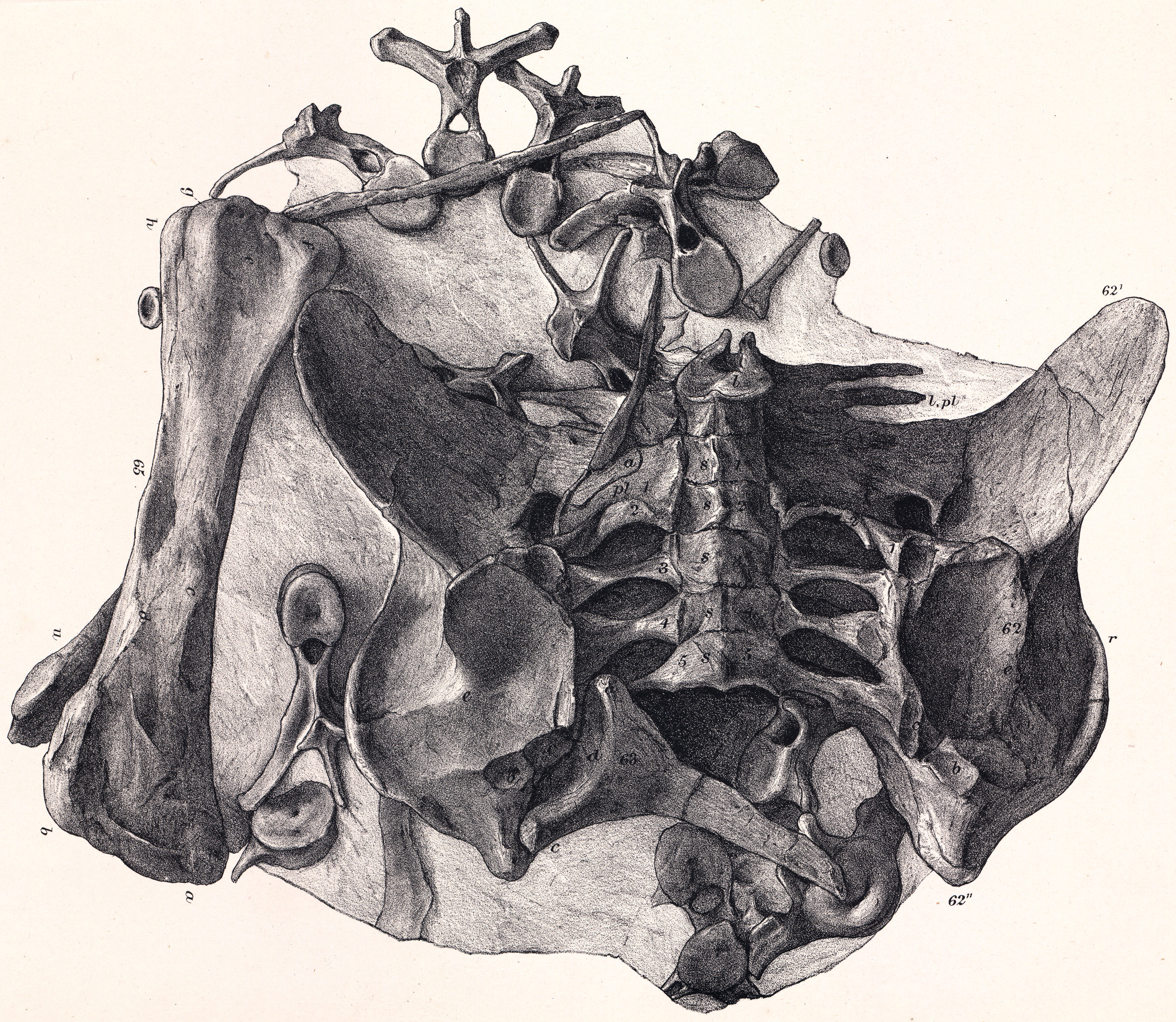
Holotype of Dacentrurus armatus (NHMUK PV OR 46013), from Owen's 1875 monograph

On 23 May 1874, James Shopland of the Swindon Brick and Tyle Company reported in a letter to Professor Richard Owen that their clay pit, the Swindon Great Quarry below Old Swindon Hill at Swindon in Wiltshire, had again produced a fossil skeleton that he was willing to donate to the British Museum of Natural History. Owen sent out William Davies to secure the specimen, which proved to be encased in an eight feet high and six feet wide clay nodule. Owen presumed that the extremely hard nodule had been formed by vapours emitted by the decomposing carcass. During an attempt to lift it in its entirety, the loam clump crumbled into several pieces. These were eventually transported to London in crates with a total weight of three tonnes. The bones were subsequently partially uncovered by Owen's preparator, the mason Caleb Barlow.

Owen named and described the remains in 1875 as the type species Omosaurus armatus. The generic name is derived from Greek ὦμος, omos, "upper arm", in reference to the robust humerus. The specific name armatus can mean "armed" in Latin and in this case refers to a large spike that Owen assumed was present on the upper arm. The study was illustrated by high quality lithographs.

The holotype, NHMUK PV OR 46013, was found in a layer of the Kimmeridge Clay Formation dating from the late Kimmeridgian. The pits were soon abandoned; as a result it is no longer possible to determine their exact location and age. The holotype consists of a postcranial skeleton lacking the skull. The main nodule fragment contains the pelvis; a series of six posterior dorsal vertebrae, all sacrals and eight anterior caudal vertebrae; a right femur and some loose vertebrae. In all, thirteen detached vertebrae are present in the material. Also an almost complete left forelimb was contained by another loam clump. Additional elements include a partial right fibula with calcaneum, a partial tibia, a right neck plate and a left tail spike.

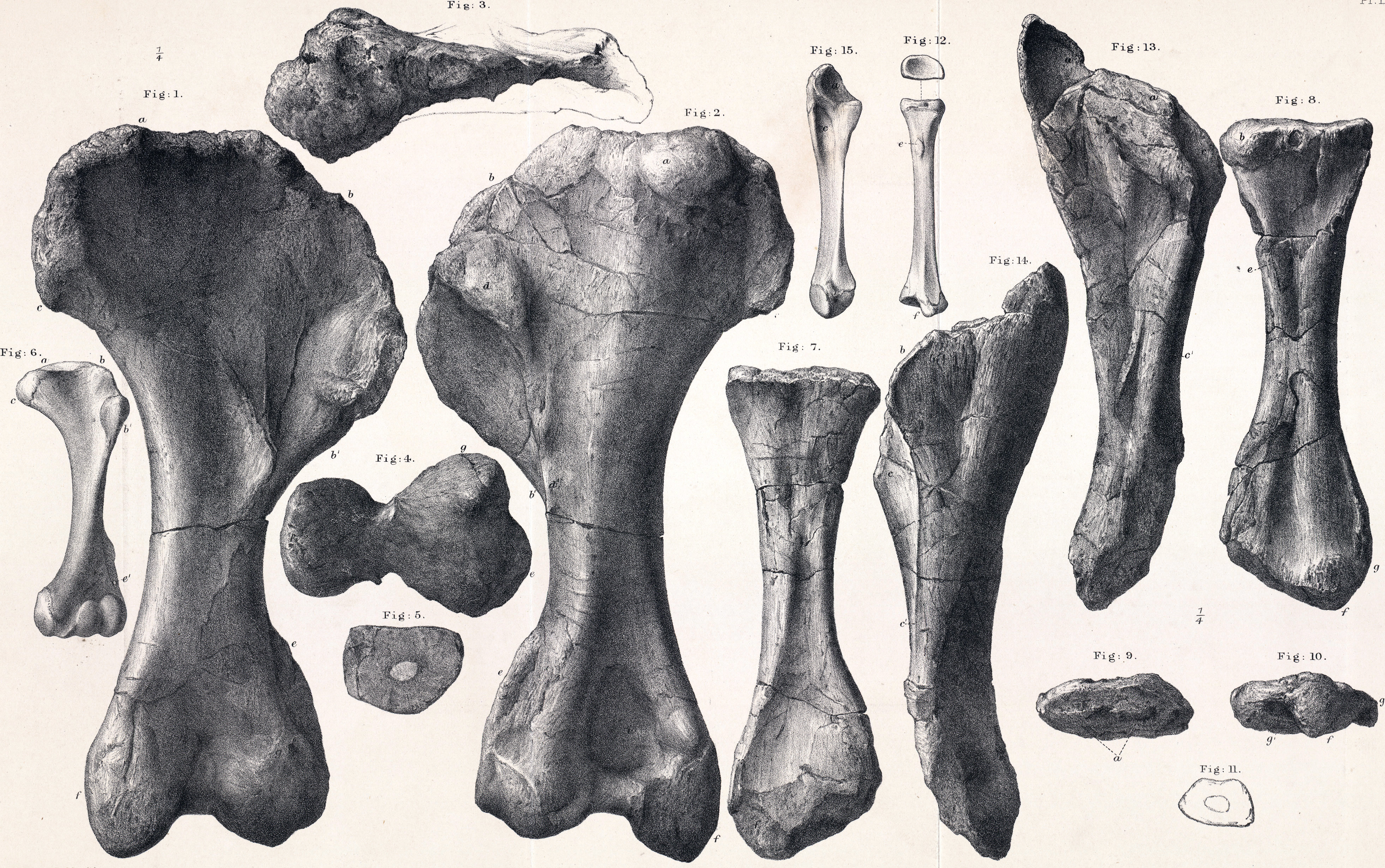
A smaller nodule contained a left forelimb, the humerus, radius and ulna

Several other species would be named within the genus Omosaurus. Part of the British Museum of Natural History collection was specimen NHMUK PV OR 46013, a pair of spike bases found in the Kimmeridge Clay by William Cunnington near the Great Western Railway cutting near Wootton Bassett. These Owen in 1877 named Omosaurus hastiger, the epithet meaning "spike-bearer" or "lance-wielder", the spikes by him seen as placed on the wrist of the animal.

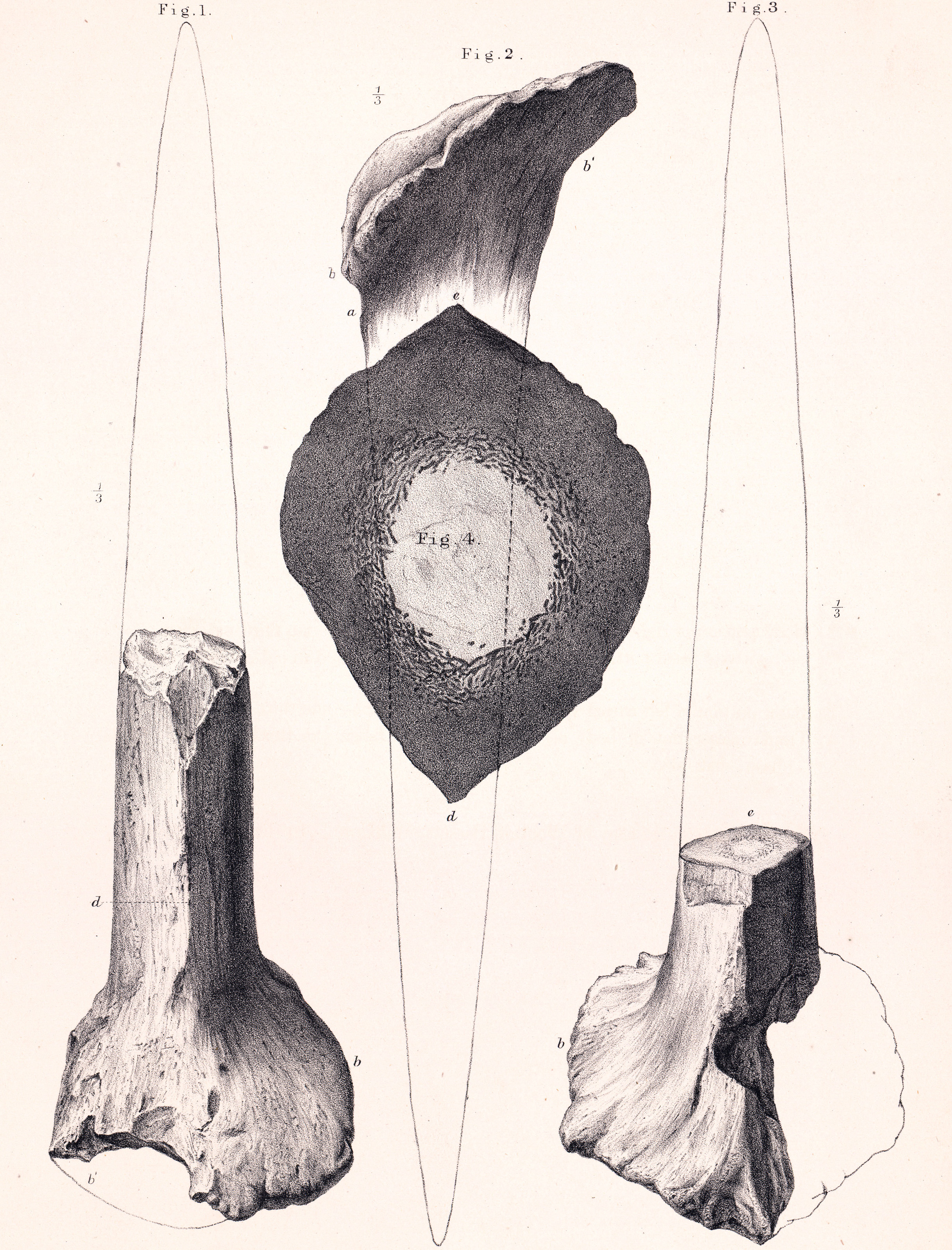
Holotype spikes of O. hastiger, the second species named

In 1887, John Whitaker Hulke named Omosaurus durobrivensis based on specimen NHMUK PV R 1989 found at Tanholt, close to Eye, Cambridgeshire, the specific name being derived from Durobrivae. (That specimen is sometimes mistakenly said to have been found at Fletton, Peterborough, Cambridgeshire, which is where Alfred Nicholson Leeds made most of his finds.) This in 1956 became the separate genus Lexovisaurus.

In 1893, Harry Govier Seeley named Omosaurus phillipsii, based on a left femur of a young individual found at Slingsby, North Yorkshire, specimen YM 498, the epithet honouring the late John Phillips. Seeley suggested this may be the same taxon as Priodontognathus phillipsii Seeley 1869, which has led to the misunderstanding, due to its having the same specific name, that Priodontognathus was simply subsumed by him under Omosaurus. This interpretation however, is incorrect as both species have different holotypes. O. phillipsii has been considered a nomen dubium. "Omosaurus leedsi" is a nomen nudum used by Seeley on a label for CAMSM J.46874, a plate found in Cambridgeshire, the epithet honouring Alfred Nicholson Leeds.

In 1910, Friedrich von Huene named Omosaurus vetustus, based on specimen OUM J.14000, a femur found in the west bank of Cherwell River, the epithet meaning "the ancient one". In 1911, Franz Nopcsa named Omosaurus lennieri, the epithet honouring Gustave Lennier, based on a partial skeleton in 1899 found in the Kimmeridgian Argiles d'Octeville near Cap de la Hève in Normandy, France. The specimen would be destroyed during an allied bombing of Le Havre in 1944. The species was by Peter Galton considered a junior synonym of Omosaurus armatus in 1991.

Even as the last two Omosaurus species were named, it had become known that the name Omosaurus had been preoccupied by a "crocodilian" (in fact a phytosaur), Omosaurus perplexus Leidy 1856. This had been pointed out by Othniel Charles Marsh during a visit to Great Britain. In 1900, Richard Lydekker tried to solve this by subsuming the first species under Stegosaurus, as a Stegosaurus armatus and a Stegosaurus hastiger. It had escaped him that Marsh had already named a Stegosaurus armatus in 1877.

In 1902, Frederick Augustus Lucas renamed the genus into Dacentrurus. The name is derived from Greek δα~, da~, "very" or "full of", κέντρον, kentron, "point", and οὐρά, oura, "tail". Lucas only gave a new combination name for the type species Omosaurus armatus: Dacentrurus armatus, but in 1915 Edwin Hennig moved most Omosaurus species to Dacentrurus, resulting in a Dacentrurus hastiger, Dacentrurus durobrivensis, Dacentrurus phillipsi and a Dacentrurus lennieri. Nevertheless, it would be common for researchers to use the name Omosaurus instead until the middle of the twentieth century. D. vetustus, earlier indicated as Omosaurus (Dacentrurus) vetustus by von Huene, was included with Lexovisaurus as a Lexovisaurus vetustus in 1983, but that assignment was rejected with both editions of the Dinosauria, and O. vetustus is now the type species of "Eoplophysis".

In 2021, remains attributed to Dacentrurus sensu lato were reported from the earliest Cretaceous (Berriasian) Angeac-Charente bonebed of France. These consisted of a partial skeleton including parts of the braincase, vertebrae, ribs and phalanges.

In 2024, 11 specimens (including the holotype and referred material of Miragaia longicollum) from France, Portugal, and Spain were assigned to Dacentrurus armatus.

=== Distribution ===
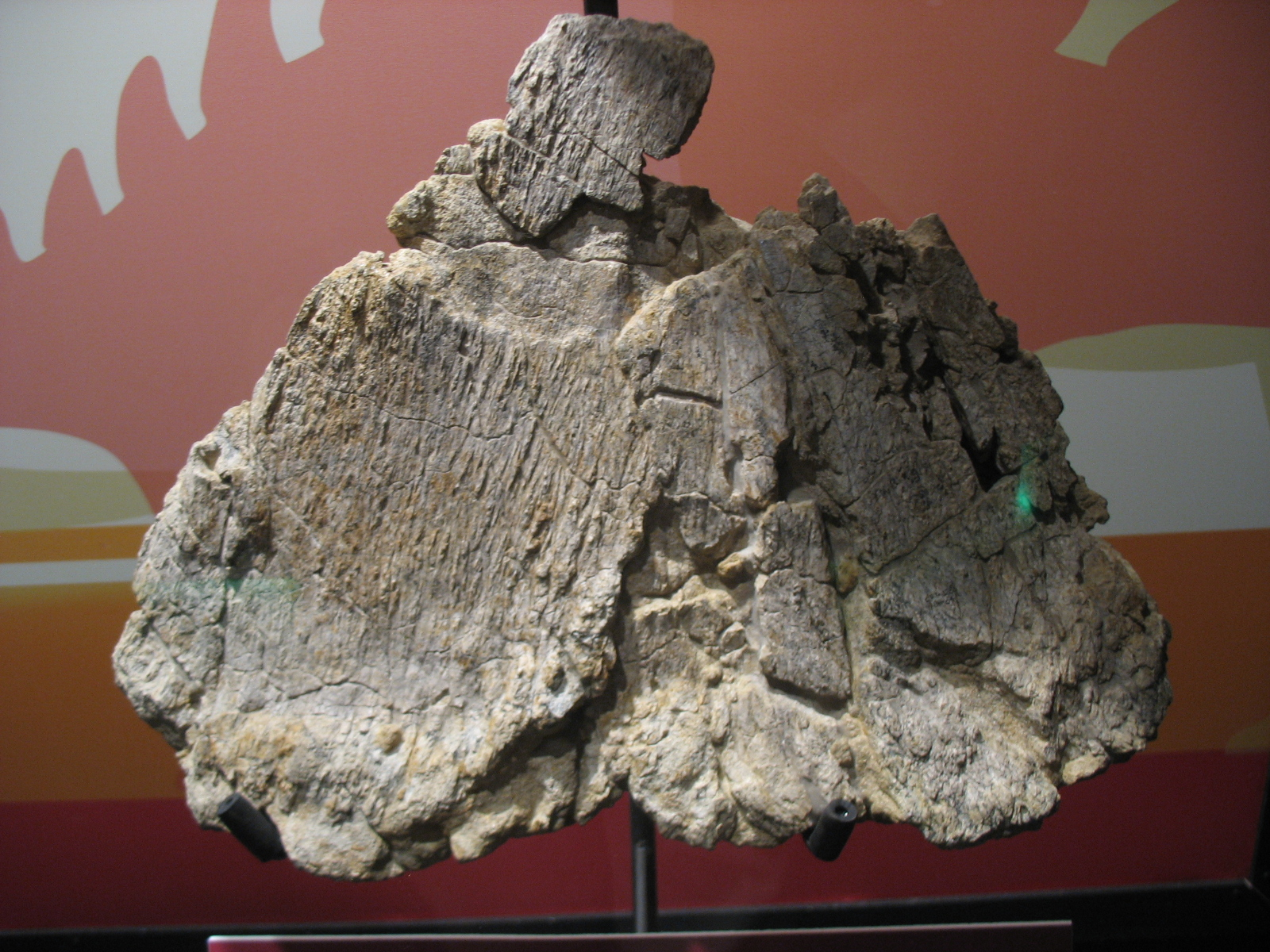
Plate from Spain

Due to the fact it represented the best known stegosaurian species from Europe, the first known from articulated remains, most stegosaur discoveries in this area were referred to Dacentrurus. This included finds in Wiltshire and Dorset in southern England (among them a vertebra ascribed to D. armatus in Weymouth), fossils from France and Spain and five more historically recent skeletons from Portugal. Most of these finds were fragmentary in nature; the only more complete skeletons were the holotypes of D. armatus and D. lennieri. Eventually the strata from which Dacentrurus was reported amounted to the following list:

- Argiles d'Octeville
- Camadas de Alcobaça
- Kimmeridge Clay
- Lourinhã Formation
- Unidade Bombarral
- Villar del Arzobispo Formation

A longitudinally sectioned egg, with a length of 125 millimetres, from Portugal has been attributed to Dacentrurus, the first associated with any stegosaur.

Remains in 1957 named as a sauropod, Astrodon pusillus, were in 1981 by Galton identified as a Dacentrurus juvenile.

Peter Malcolm Galton in the eighties referred all stegosaur remains from Late Jurassic deposits in western Europe to D. armatus. A radically different approach was in 2008 taken by Susannah Maidment who limited the material of D. armatus to its holotype. Most named species, among them Astrodon pusillus from Portugal based on stegosaur fossils, she considered to be nomina dubia. She considered the specimens from mainland Europe to possibly represent a separate species, but as they were too limited to establish distinctive traits she assigned them to a Dacentrurus sp.

In 2013, Alberto Cobos and Francisco Gascó described stegosaurian vertebral remains, which were found grouped together in the "Barranco Conejero" locality of the Villar del Arzobispo Formation in Riodeva (Teruel, Spain). The remains were assigned to Dacentrurus armatus and consist of four vertebral centra, specimens MAP-4488-4491, from a single individual, two of which are cervical vertebrae; the third is a dorsal, and the last is a caudal. This discovery was considered significant because it would demonstrate both the intra-specific variability of Dacentrurus armatus, and the strong prevalence of Dacentrurus in the Iberian range during the Jurassic-Cretaceous boundary, approximately 145 million years ago. However, new referred material of Miragaia described in 2019 shows stronger affinities to the Villar del Arzobispo material than to the holotype material of Dacentrurus. However, Sánchez-Fenollosa et al. (2024) supported the synonymy of the two taxa based on the new specimen of Dacentrurus from the Villar del Arzobispo Formation, and suggested that Alcovasaurus is a separate genus. In their re-description of the specimen MG 4863, Costa et al. (2025) argued that the two taxa are not synonymous based on comparison with the Dacentrurus holotype and that Alcovasaurus should be included as a second species of Miragaia.

== Description ==
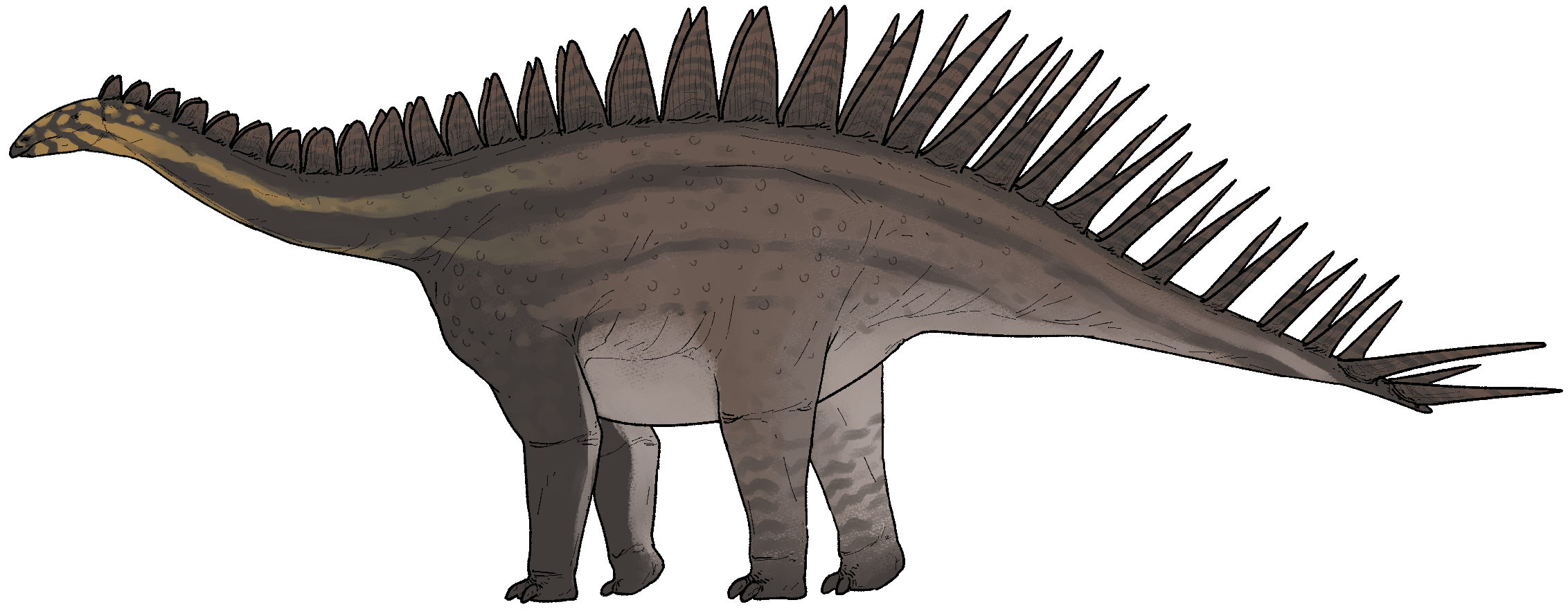
Life restoration

Dacentrurus was one of the largest genera of stegosaurs along with Stegosaurus, with some specimens having been estimated to reach 8–9 metres (26–30 ft) in length, 1.8 metres (5.9 ft) in hip height and 5–7.4 metric tons (5.5–8.2 short tons) in body mass. For a stegosaur, the gut was especially broad, and a massive rump is also indicated by exceptionally wide dorsal vertebrae centra. The hindlimb was rather short, but the forelimb relatively long, largely because of a long upper arm.

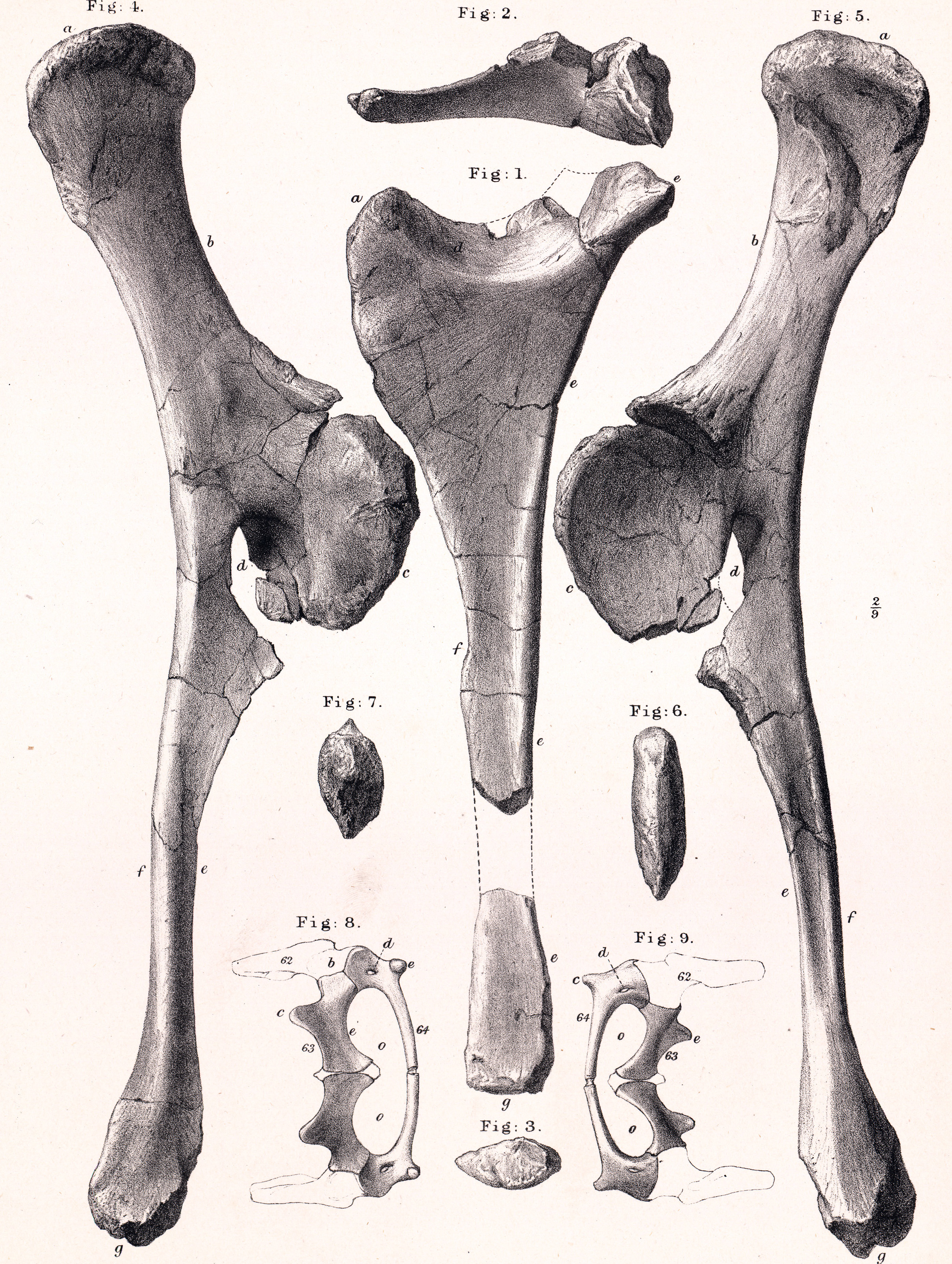
The straight upper edge of the ischium, here shown between pubic bones, is the one certain autapomorphy of D. armatus

In 1991, Galton provided a possible diagnosis. The neck consists of twelve vertebrae. The rear third of the neck vertebrae and the entire dorsal series are massively built in that the maximal transverse width of their centra exceeds the maximum anterior-posterior length. In the rear two-thirds of the dorsal series, the pedicels of the neural arches are solid and short with the transverse processes having a minimal angle of 55 degrees with the neural spine. The sacrum consists of seven fused vertebrae preceded by two dorsosacrals. The front tail vertebrae are also massively built with short neural spines ending in massive rounded tops. In the pelvis, the anterior blade of the ilium is short and widening to the front. The ischium tapers to below and is straight in side view. The radius had 69% of the length of the humerus; the ulna 79%. The humerus has 68% of the length of the thighbone and the ilium 85%. At least some plates of the back armour are small with a thick base. At least two pair of stocky spines are present with an expanded base and four pairs of long spines with a small base on the tail.

If the material is limited to the holotype, as Maidment proposed, only a single autapomorphy, unique derived trait, remains: the straight upper edge of the ischium. However, in 2019 three more possible autapomorphies were established, based on Spanish material. The front end of the prepubis is expanded to below. The tip of the neural spines of the neck vertebrae is expanded to behind. The transverse processes of the neck vertebrae are located at midheight of the prezygapophyses, the front articulation processes.

=== Skeleton ===
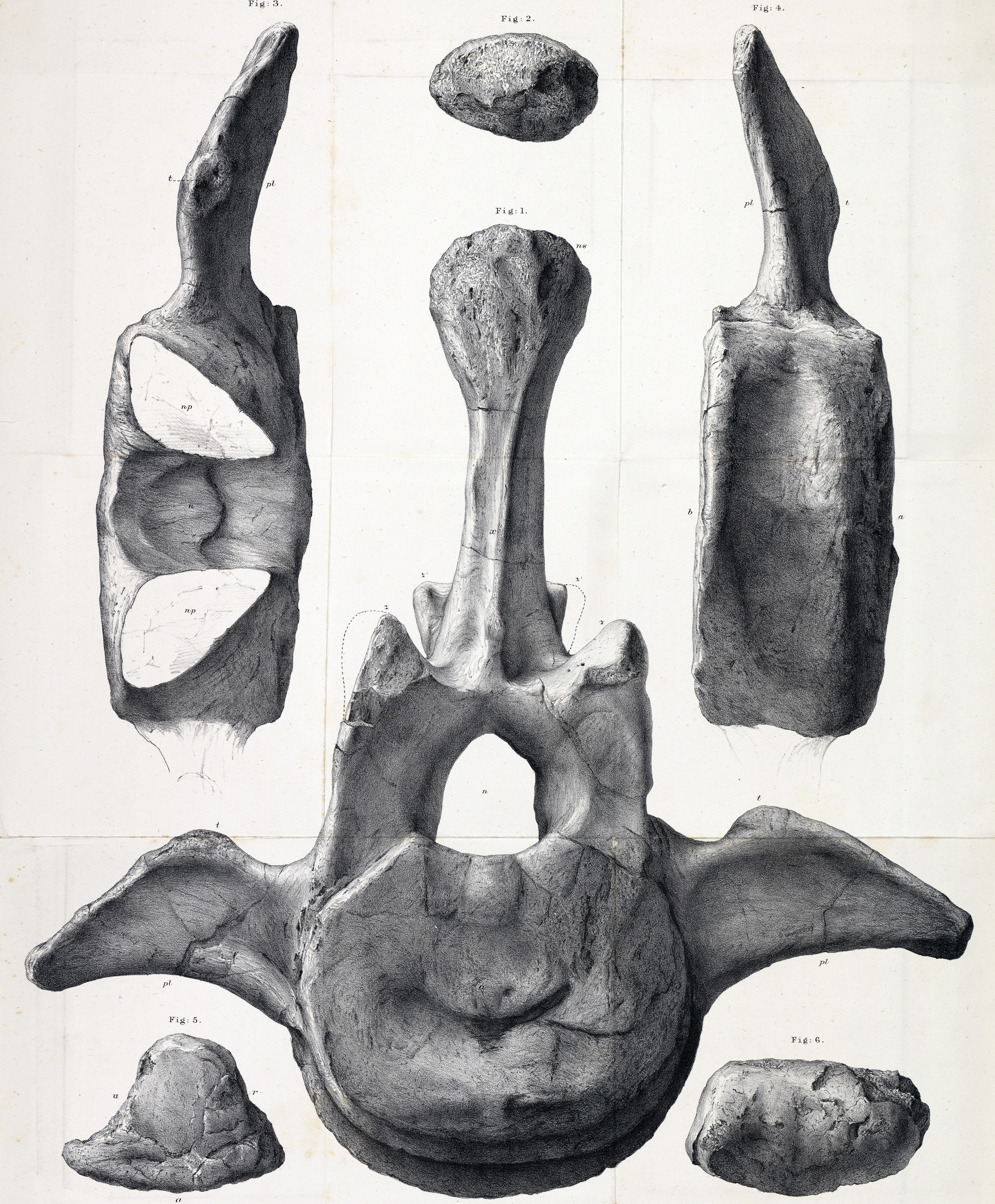
The first caudal vertebra has points on the upper edge of its transverse processes

The centra of the neck vertebrae are exceptionally robust, more so than with any other stegosaur known in 1985. Also the centra of the back are massively built. That they are transversely wider than horizontally long, is the opposite of the normal situation with the Stegosauria. The upper side of the dorsal centrum shows a distinctive depression, an exaggeration of the small dent usually present in this position. In all the dorsals, the angle between the transverse processes and the neural spine is at least 55 degrees. With Stegosaurus and Kentrosaurus, the same is true for the front vertebrae, but in those genera the posterior dorsals have processes pointing much more vertically, up to 35 degrees. Comparable inclinations are usual for other stegosaurs. As their pedicels are short, the articulation processes are placed low on the neural arches. According to Galton, the sacrum is not particularly vertically depressed. The centra of the frontmost tail vertebrae are relatively large. As a result, the neural arches are just 40% taller, whereas with other stegosaurs, the relative height can be two or three times the relative centre height. In the first caudal, the transverse processes are vertically deep and oriented horizontally with a conspicuous point on the front upper edge. In this they resemble those of Stegosaurus and Lexovisaurus.

The forelimb of Dacentrurus contains a massive humerus, its shaft protruding in an enormous deltopectoral crest, the attachment for a powerful musculature. This trait is shared with the majority of derived stegosaurs, however. An exceptional trait is that the thighbone is only 47% longer than the humerus. The ulna has 79% of the length of the humerus, a basal value comparable to that of Kentrosaurus but much lower than with Stegosaurus. The ventral surface of the metacarpals is smooth, lacking the raised rugosities of adult Stegosaurus.

The holotype has a pelvis of considerable dimensions. The right ilium has a maximal length of 1048 millimetres. Measured over the front blades of both ilia, the pelvis is 1493 millimetres wide. According to Galton to the front blade, the Musculus iliotibialis 1 was attached, a muscle lifting the lower leg. The pubic bone has a deep processus praepubicus at the front and the foramen obturatum was closed at the rear.

In the hindlimb, the holotype shows a fourth trochanter present just above the middle of the thighbone shaft; in Stegosaurus the only trace of the fourth trochanter is a rugose vestige in one juvenile specimen. In the holotype, the distal end of the tibia has an exceptionally large transverse width of 284 millimetres.

=== Armour ===
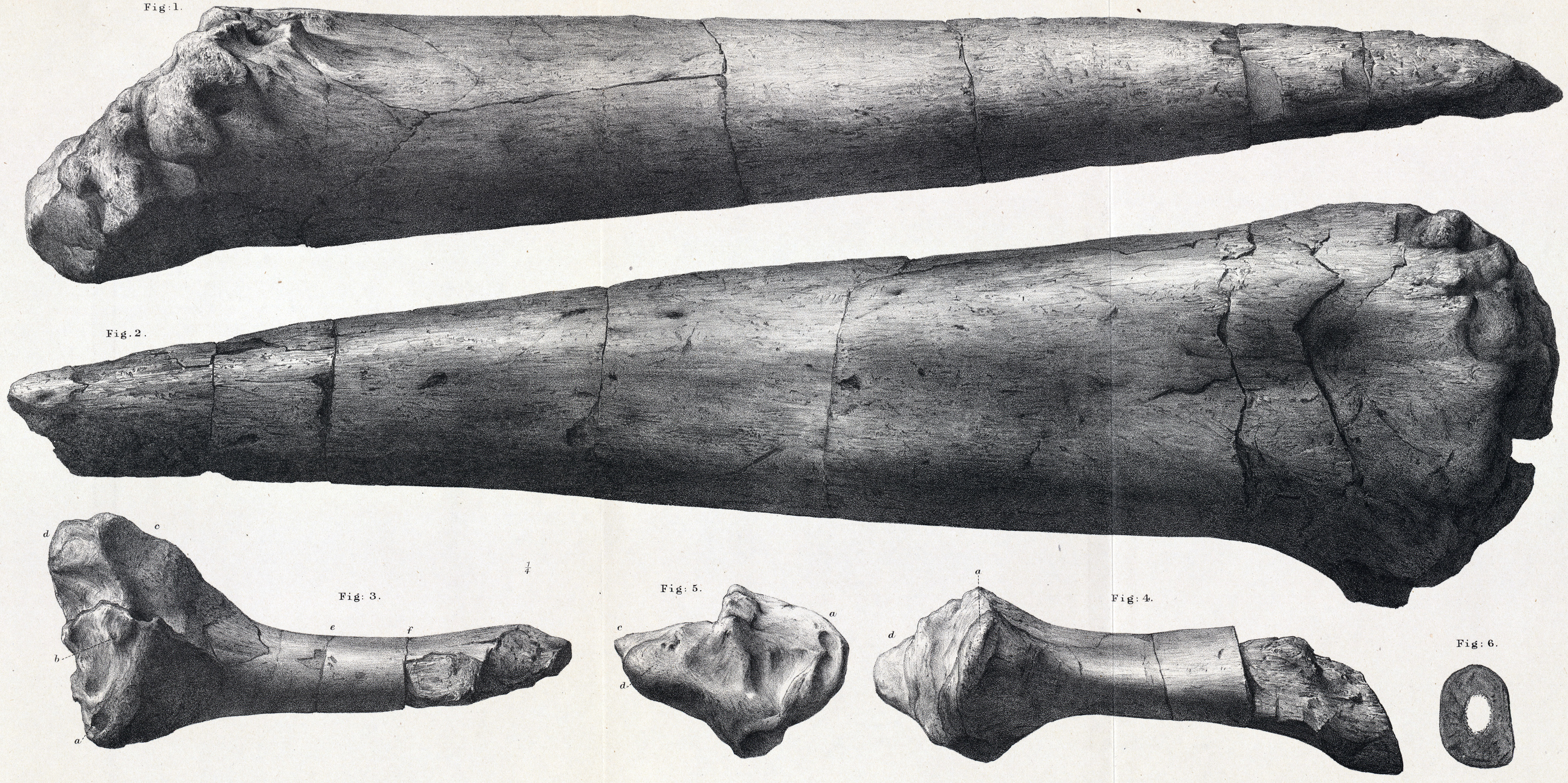
The left tail spike

Although Dacentrurus is considered to have the same general proportions as Stegosaurus, its plate and spike configuration is known to be rather different, as it probably had both two rows of small plates on its neck and two rows of longer spikes along its tail.

The holotype specimen of Dacentrurus armatus contained a small blunt asymmetrical neck or front back plate. Its base length is fifteen centimetres and the transverse width is seven centimetres. The base is oblique and the longest plate surface seems to be on the outside. Seen from that side it is pointing obliquely to the rear. The outer surfaces are smooth but the ventral surface is porous with irregular depressions.

The holotype also included a left tail spike which could have been part of a thagomizer. It is generally shaped as the rear spikes of some Stegosaurus species. However, a difference is that Stegosaurus spikes are transversely flattened whereas the Dacentrurus spike is transversely wide with gently convex surfaces lacking clear cutting edges. This spike has a preserved maximum length of 456 millimetres. Its maximal base width is 118 millimetres. The base is only slightly expanded but its ventral surface is strongly sculptured.

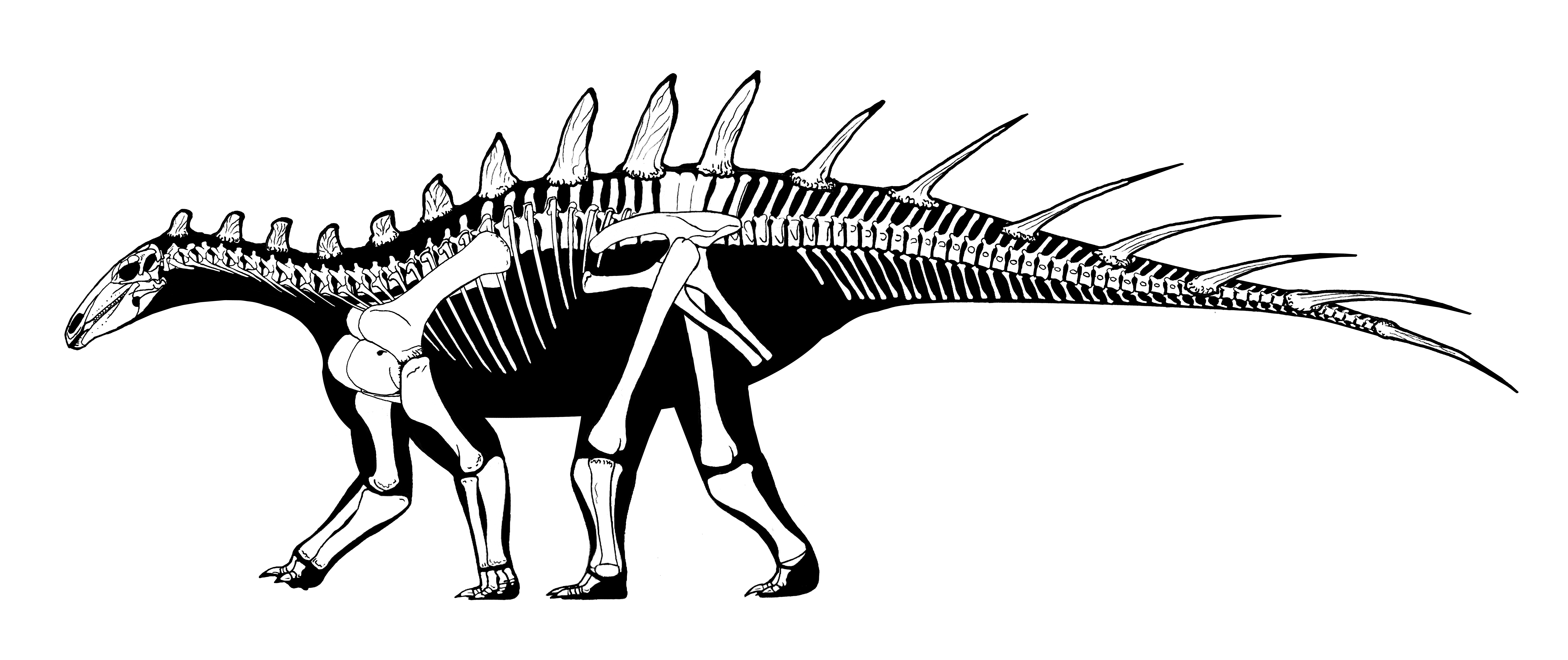
Skeleton diagram

The two spines that are the holotype of Omosaurus hastiger have very massive bases. According to Galton, they are from a more anterior position than the spike preserved with BMNH 46013 and form a left-right pair. He considered the morphology variation to be comparable to that of Kentrosaurus. The spine on the right is more complete with a transverse base width of 205 millimetres and an estimated base length of twenty-two centimeters. Owen reconstructed the original length at seventy centimetres. Its ventral surface has a complex morphology. From the front to the rear it shows a convex curvature. The surface is divided into two zones by a longitudinal ridge. The outer zone covers two thirds of the surface, the inner zone a third. Both zones are strongly concave transversely. The better preserved left spine shows that the inner edge has many small notches. There is a lange central cavity connected to small holes in the ventral surface by channels.

Dacentrurus has sometimes been portrayed with a spike growing near the shoulder, similar to Kentrosaurus. Whether this portrayal is accurate or not is not yet determined. According to Galton, such shoulder spikes are not homologous to those of nodosaurids. The stocky spines found with Dacentrurus he thought were placed on the tail base.

== Phylogeny ==
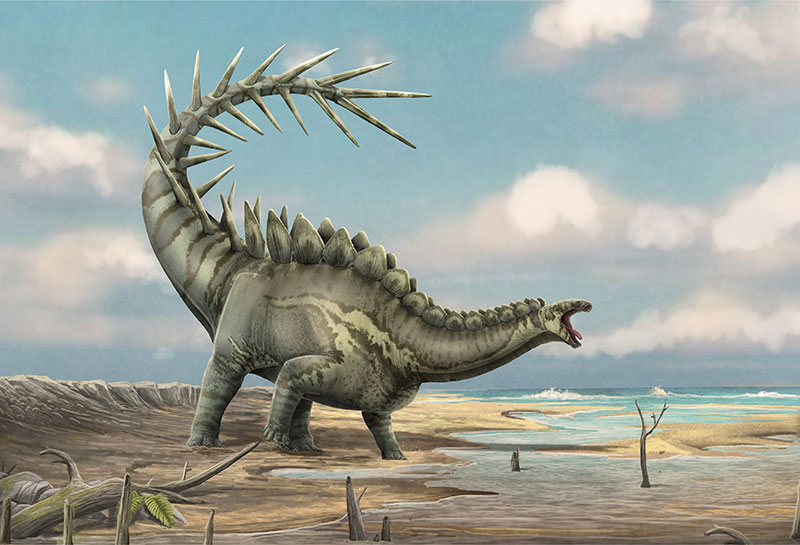
Life restoration in a coastal environment

Dacentrurus was the first stegosaur of which good remains had ever been discovered; earlier finds as Paranthodon, Regnosaurus and Craterosaurus were too limited to be directly recognisable as representing a distinctive new group. Owen therefore was unable to closely relate his Omosaurus to other species but was aware it represented a member of the Dinosauria. In 1888 Richard Lydekker named a family Omosauridae, but this name fell into disuse once it was realised that Omosaurus was preoccupied. In the twentieth century Dacentrurus was usually assigned to the Stegosauridae.

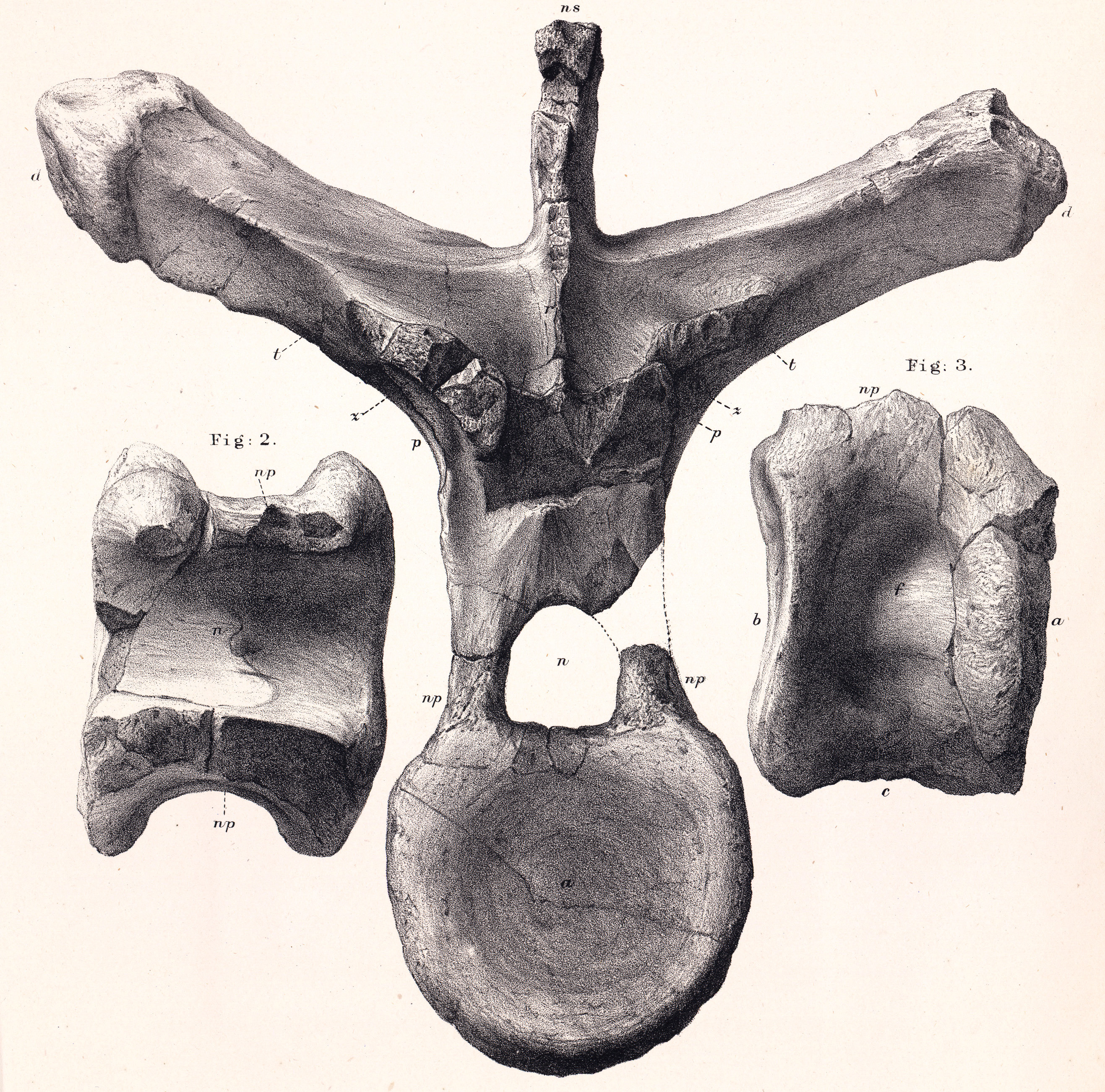
Galton regarded the low angle of the transverse processes as indicating a basal position in the evolutionary tree

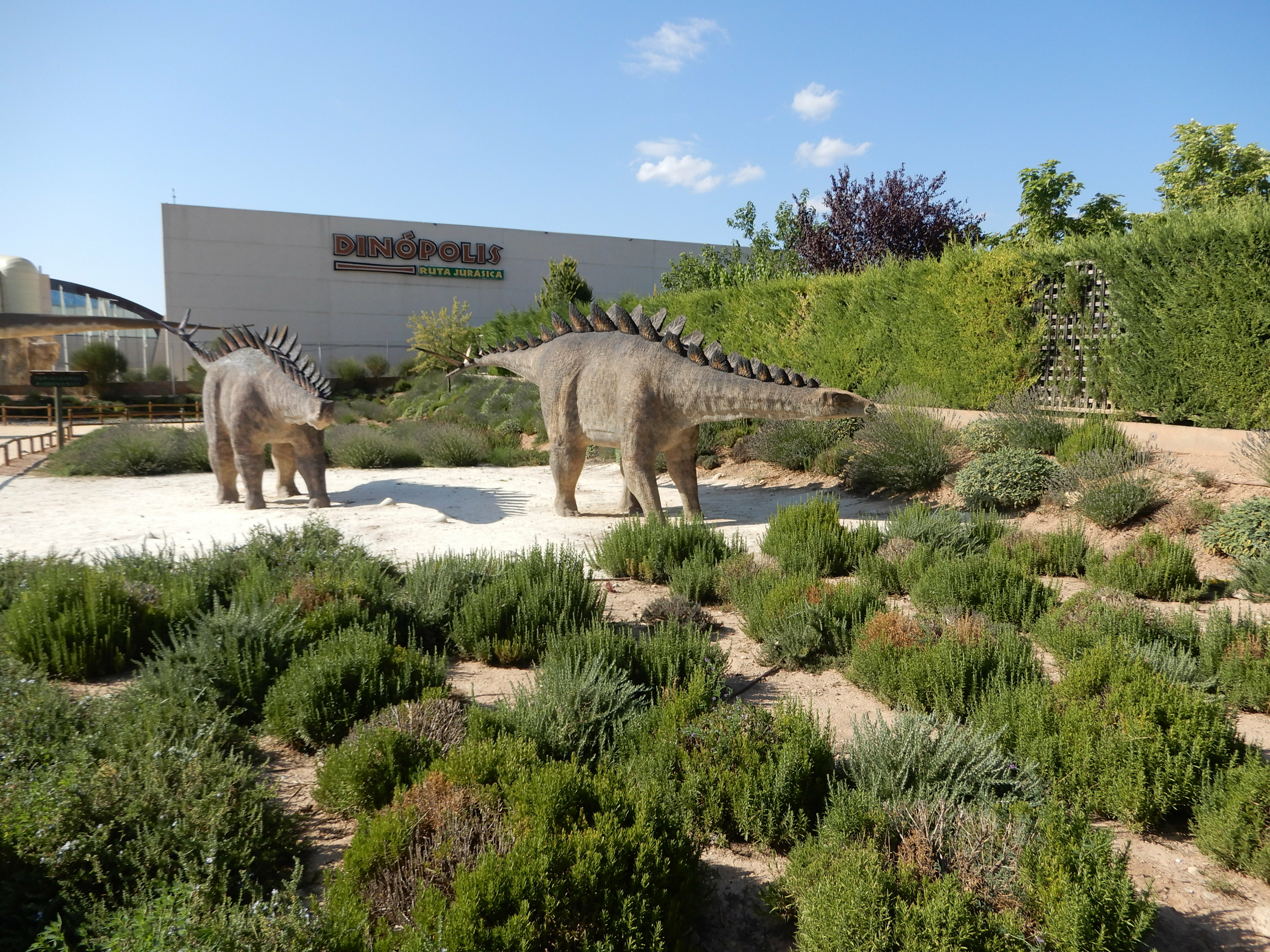
Models outside Dinópolis

In 1957, Robert Hoffstetter thought that Dacentrurus was more derived than Lexovisaurus. In 1969, Ronald Steel agreed, even though Dacentrurus showed basal traits as an apparent lack of dermal plates and a long forelimb. In 1981, Galton considered the low angle of the transverse processes, close to that of most other ornithischians, as a plesiomorphy. The same would be true of the low columnar pedicel of the neural arches. Therefore, despite dermal plates in fact being present, he concluded that Dacentrurus was an early off-shoot of the stegosaurian tree.

Earlier often considered to have been a rather basal stegosaurid, Dacentrurus was by more extensive cladistic analyses shown to be relatively derived. In 2001, Kenneth Carpenter e.a. found it as the sister species of Hesperosaurus. In 2008 and 2010 studies determined it as forming the clade Dacentrurinae with its sister species Miragaia longicollum. The Dacentrurinae were the sister group of Stegosaurus (Stegosaurinae sensu Sereno). The following cladogram shows the position of Dacentrurus armatus within the Thyreophora according to Maidment (2010):

- Thyreophora
  - Emausaurus
  - - Scelidosaurus
    - Eurypoda
      - Stegosauria
        - - Huayangosaurus
          - Chungkingosaurus
        - Stegosauridae
          - Kentrosaurus
          - - - Dacentrurinae
                - Dacentrurus armatus
                - Miragaia
              - Stegosaurus
            - Loricatosaurus
        - Tuojiangosaurus
        - Paranthodon
        - Gigantspinosaurus
      - Ankylosauria

== Paleobiology ==
Dacentrurus shares with other Dacentrurinae the presence of large olecranon horns on the ulnae. Combined with large deltoid crests on the humerus, they suggest a powerful musculus deltoideus making a strong humeral flexion and abduction possible. The forelimbs could then be firmly anchored on the ground while the tail was forcefully swept from side to side, allowing the thagomizer to defend against large theropod predators, such as Torvosaurus.

== See also ==
- Timeline of stegosaur research
