= Inclusion =

Inclusion or Include may refer to:

== Sociology ==
- Social inclusion, improving the ability, opportunity, and worthiness of people, disadvantaged on the basis of their identity, to take part in society
  - Inclusion (disability rights), including individuals with disabilities in everyday activities and ensuring they have access to resources and opportunities in ways that are similar to their non-disabled peers
  - Inclusion (education), including all students to equal access to equal opportunities of education and learning

== Science and technology ==
=== Mathematics ===
- Inclusion (set theory), or subset
- Inclusion (Boolean algebra), the Boolean analogue to the subset relation
- Inclusion map, or inclusion function, or canonical injection
- Inclusion (logic), the concept that all the contents of one object are also contained within a second object

=== Other uses in science and technology ===
- Inclusion (mineral), any material that is trapped inside a mineral during its formation
- Inclusion bodies, aggregates of stainable substances in biological cells
- Inclusion (cell), insoluble non-living substance suspended in a cell's cytoplasm
- Inclusion (taxonomy), combining of biological species
- Include directive, in computer programming

== Other uses ==
- Include (horse), a racehorse
- Centre for Economic and Social Inclusion, a former British think-tank known as Inclusion

== See also ==
- Inclusive (disambiguation)
- Deletionism and inclusionism in Wikipedia
- Clusivity, a linguistic concept
- Inclusion–exclusion principle, in combinatorics
- Incorporation by reference, in law
- Transclusion, the inclusion of part or all of an electronic document into one or more other documents by hypertext reference
