= Alfred Nicholson Leeds =

English amateur palaeontologist

Alfred Nicholson Leeds (9 March 1847 – 25 August 1917) was an English amateur palaeontologist.

== Biography ==
Leeds was born at Eyebury, Peterborough, the youngest of the eight children of Edward Thurlow Leeds (1802–51) and Eliza Mary Leeds (née Nicholson). He was educated at Warwick School. He had wanted to become a doctor, but circumstances meant that from 1868 he had to take on the management of Eyebury Farm (in The Fens, and historically attached to Peterborough Abbey) as a gentleman farmer.

Leeds' elder brother Charles, a student at the University of Oxford, had been encouraged by Professor John Phillips to persevere in collecting fossils from near his home. Alfred joined him in these searches, and between them they developed better methods of disinterring, and of scientifically recording, fossils in soft clay than had been used before. (They rewarded the workmen at the clay pits (which served a brickworks in Fletton, Peterborough) for not doing so themselves, but instead sending notice to Eyebury.) In 1887, Charles emigrated to New Zealand; but Alfred continued to search for fossils, assisted by his wife and by their second son, Edward Thurlow Leeds ((1877–1955), who was Keeper of the Ashmolean Museum from 1928–45).

Leeds amassed one of the largest collections of fossil vertebrates in the world. In 1889, his portrait was painted by the 17-year-old William Nicholson. From 1890 onwards, he began to present his most important specimens of Jurassic fossils from the Oxford Clay near Peterborough to the British Museum. He was a Fellow of the Geological Society; in 1893, he was awarded part of its Lyell Fund.

Other museums in the UK and elsewhere hold items from his collection; including the National Museum of Ireland.

An extinct genus of fish, Leedsichthys, and several extinct species have been named in his honour.

== Death ==
Leeds died in Eyebury on 25 August 1917 at the age of 70.

== Discoveries and honours ==
- Early 1880s – he acquired the skeleton of a stegosaur dinosaur found in a brick pit near Eye, Cambridgeshire. In 1887, it was described by John Whitaker Hulke as a new species, Omosaurus durobrivensis. It is now considered to be within the genus Lexovisaurus.
- 1880s – he collected fossils of a large Mesozoic bony fish, which proved to be from the novel genus Leedsichthys, described and named in his honour by Arthur Smith Woodward in 1889.
- 1887 – Hulke described a species of sauropod, Ornithopsis leedsii, naming it in his honour. It was renamed Cetiosauriscus leedsi, before being idenitifed as a nomen dubium.
- 1889 – the type species of a genus of iguanodontian dinosaur was named Camptosaurus leedsi in his honour by Richard Lydekker. It has since been renamed Callovosaurus leedsi,
- 1893 – Lydekker named the type species of a genus of ankylosaurian ornithischian dinosaur Sarcolestes leedsi in his honour.
- 1901 – Harry Seeley described a species of stegosaur Omosaurus leedsi, naming it in his honour. The genus has since been renamed Dacentrurus.
- 1907-09 – he collected a fossil, which in 2013 proved to be the sole species of a geosaurine metriorhynchid crocodyliform known within the genus Tyrannoneustes.

== See also ==
- Andrews, C. W. (1910). A Descriptive Catalogue of the Marine Reptiles of the Oxford Clay, Based on the Leeds Collection in the British Museum (Natural History), Part I. London: British Museum.
- Andrews, C. W. (1913). A Descriptive Catalogue of the Marine Reptiles of the Oxford Clay, Part II. London: British Museum.
- Leeds, E. T. (1956). The Leeds Collection of Fossil Reptiles from the Oxford Clay of Peterborough. Oxford: Blackwell Ltd.
