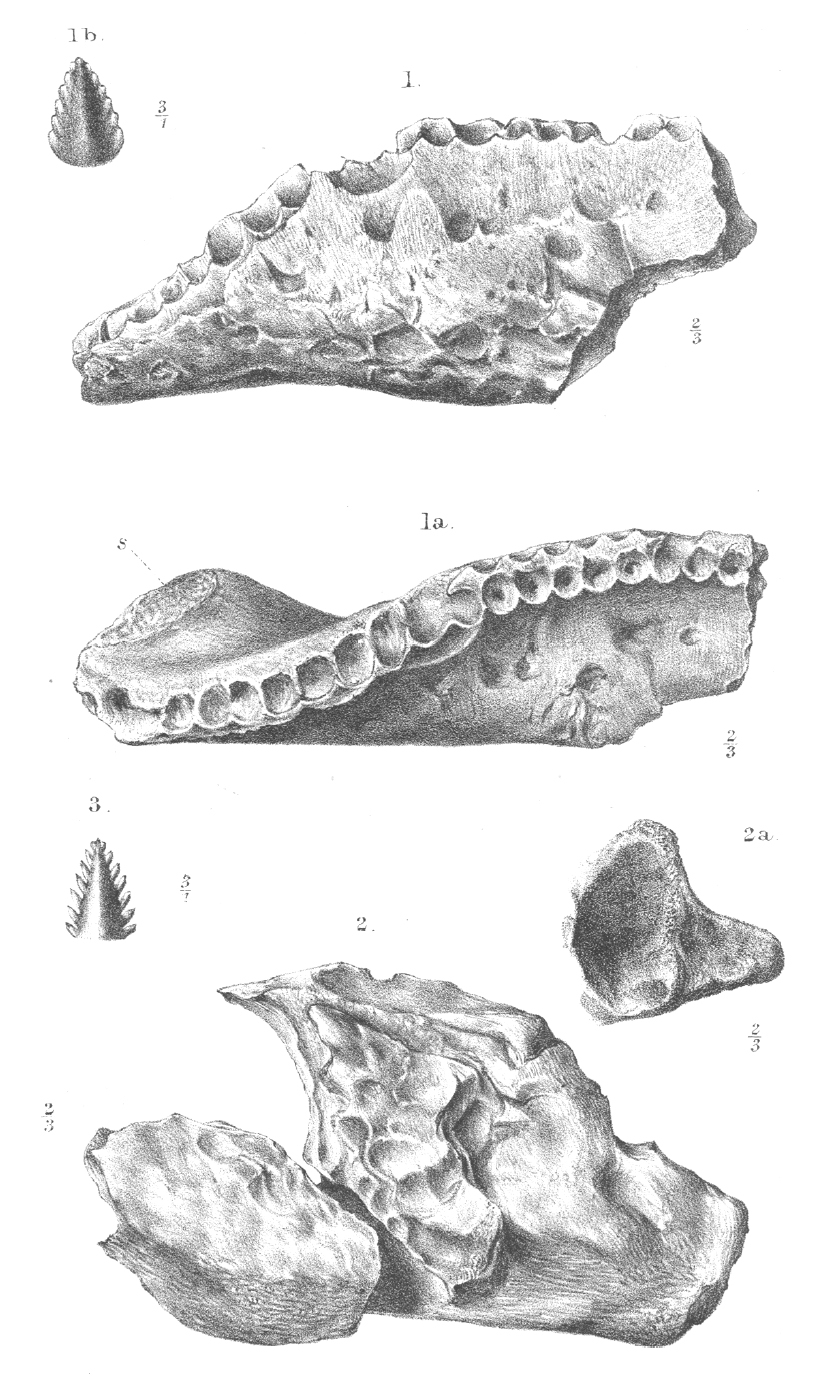
- Illustrations of the mandible and tooth (NHMUK PV R 2682)

Scientific classification
- Kingdom: Animalia
- Phylum: Chordata
- Class: Reptilia
- Clade: Dinosauria
- Clade: †Ornithischia
- Clade: †Thyreophora
- Clade: †Ankylosauria
- Genus: †Sarcolestes; Lydekker, 1893

Type species
- †Sarcolestes leedsi Lydekker, 1893

= Sarcolestes =

Sarcolestes Temporal range: Middle Jurassic, 165 Ma

Genus of reptiles (fossil)

Sarcolestes (from Ancient Greek σάρξ (sárx), meaning "flesh", and λῃστής (lēistḗs), meaning "robber", and thus, "flesh robber") is an extinct genus of ankylosaurian ornithischian dinosaur from the Oxford Clay of England. The current type and only species is S. leedsi, and the holotype is a single partial left mandible. The genus and species were named in 1893 by Richard Lydekker, who thought they belonged to a theropod.

== Discovery ==
Sarcolestes was first discovered and named in 1893 by Richard Lydekker, and its type species was designated as S. leedsi. The specific name was to honour Alfred Nicholson Leeds, the discoverer of the specimen, and many others like it. The holotype and only specimen, is a partial left mandible and fused scute that was damaged during excavation (specimen NHMUK PV R 2682). The jaw preserved one entire tooth and two crown tips in its alveolus, with the missing bone in the central section of the mandible. It lacks a preserved predentary, even though the entire mandibular symphysis is preserved and complete.

== Classification ==
Originally, Lydekker found that Sarcolestes represented a theropod. He cited lack of a predentary as excluding the taxon from ornithopods, and tooth morphology as excluding it from sauropods. Within theropods, it was found to be sufficiently different from one main groups of theropods including Coelurus, Calamosaurus, and Compsognathus, and the megalosaurids including Megalosaurus. Thus, Lydekker placed it in Thecodontosauridae, a group of theropods (now placed in Sauropodomorpha) including Thecodontosaurus. Lydekker noted that Sarcolestes was similar in dental morphology to Priodontognathus, and that together they might be shown to be related to scelidosaurids. However, he also noted that together they may represent their own group within Theropoda. In 1901, Franz Nopcsa found that Sarcolestes was in fact herbivorous, and classified it in Stegosauridae with genera such as Polacanthus, Stegosaurus, Hylaeosaurus, Stenopelix and various others. Peter Galton concluded that Sarcolestes represents a genus within Nodosauridae, with a dentary similar to that of Sauropelta. However, others have cast doubt on this assignment and even the validity of Sarcolestes. Sarcolestes is one of a few ankylosaurians known from the Middle Jurassic; Spicomellus may be slightly older, having been found in the Bathonian–Callovian El Mers III Formation of Morocco.

== See also ==
- Timeline of ankylosaur research
