= Edward Thurlow Leeds =

English archaeologist and museum curator

E. T. Leeds
- Portrait photograph
- Born: Edward Thurlow Leeds; 29 July 1877; Peterborough, England
- Died: 17 August 1955 (aged 78); Oxford, England
- Citizenship: United Kingdom
- Occupations: Archaeologist; museum keeper
- Spouse: Alice (m. 1925)
- Parents: Alfred Nicholson Leeds (father); Ferrier (mother)

Academic background
- Education: Uppingham School
- Alma mater: Magdalene College, Cambridge

Academic work
- Discipline: Archaeology
- Sub-discipline: Archaeology of Anglo-Saxon England; Anglo-Saxon settlement of Britain; numismatics
- Institutions: Ashmolean Museum

Edward Thurlow Leeds (29 July 1877 – 17 August 1955) was an English archaeologist and museum curator. He was Keeper of the Ashmolean Museum from 1928 to 1945.

== Biography ==
He was born in Eyebury, Peterborough on 29 July 1877, the second son of Alfred Nicholson Leeds, palaeontologist and Fellow of the Geological Society, and his wife Ferrier. He was educated at Uppingham School and then as a classical scholar at Magdalene College, Cambridge.

After graduation in 1899, his first position was as cadet in the Federated Malay States Civil Service. He spent two years in China to learn the language. In 1903, ill health forced him to abandon this career path. In five years of convalescence, he spent much time on geological work in the gravel pits at Eyebury, where his interest in archaeology developed.

In 1908, he was appointed an Assistant Keeper at the Ashmolean Museum, Oxford. Later that year, the museum was reorganised, and he became Assistant Keeper of the Department of Antiquities. Throughout the period of his Assistant Keepership, his main field of research was Anglo-Saxon archaeology.

In 1928, he was appointed Keeper of the Ashmolean and of the Department of Antiquities. He held both those positions until his retirement in 1945. After his retirement, he continued to work in the Ashmolean, where he catalogued collections of Chinese, Annamese and Korean coins in the Heberden Coin Room.

He married Alice Marjory Wright in 1925. She accompanied him on some of his excavations. He died at his home in Oxford on 17 August 1955.

A Festschrift in his honour was published in London in 1956. Leeds saw a draft of the book and began writing a response to an essay by C. F. C. Hawkes. Though incomplete, the paper was edited by Sonia Chadwick and published posthumously in the first volume of Medieval Archaeology.

== Publications ==
- Leeds, E. Thurlow (1913). The Archaeology of the Anglo-Saxon Settlements. Oxford: Oxford University Press.
- Leeds, E. Thurlow (April 1924). "An Anglo-Saxon Cremation-burial of the Seventh Century in Asthall Barrow, Oxfordshire". The Antiquaries Journal. IV (2). Society of Antiquaries of London: 113–126. doi:10.1017/S0003581500005552.
- Leeds, E. T. (1939). "Anglo-Saxon Remains". In Salzman, L. F. (ed.). A History of the County of Oxford. Victoria County History. Vol. 1. Oxford: Oxford University Press. pp. 346–372.
- Leeds, E. T. (1956). The Leeds Collection of Fossil Reptiles from the Oxford Clay of Peterborough. Oxford: Blackwell Ltd.
