= Omosaurus =

Omosaurus Temporal range: Late Triassic, Carnian

Scientific classification
- Kingdom: Animalia
- Phylum: Chordata
- Class: Reptilia
- Clade: Crurotarsi
- Genus: †Omosaurus; Leidy, 1856
- Species: †O. perplexus

Binomial name
- †Omosaurus perplexus Leidy, 1856

Synonyms
- Omosaurus Owen, 1875 (preoccupied)

Extinct genus of reptiles

Omosaurus is a dubious genus of extinct crurotarsan reptile, possibly a phytosaur, from the Late Triassic (Carnian) of North Carolina. Only scant remains are known, which makes Omosaurus hard to classify. The type, and only species, Omosaurus perplexus, was named and described in 1856 by Joseph Leidy.

== Discovery and naming ==
In the middle of the nineteenth century, geologist Professor Ebenezer Emmons discovered several reptilian teeth in the colliery of the Chatham company in North Carolina. In 1856, the fossils in his collection were described by paleontologist Joseph Leidy. Leidy combined the teeth with some vertebrae and ribs; adding to them an osteoderm or scute found in the same strata by Professor Michael Tuomey, he named the whole Omosaurus perplexus. Leidy provided no etymology; the specific name suggests he was intrigued by the "intricate" find. The generic name might be derived from the Greek ὠμός, omos, "rough", perhaps in reference to the rough surface of the scute or to the "savage" nature of a carnivorous reptile. Today, all syntypes are lost.

== Description ==
The teeth were described as being rather straight, slightly curved inwards, conical and pointed with a length of up to one inch. They had two edges at the inside and a D-shaped cross-section with the convex part positioned at the outer side. The surface of the teeth was smooth with little wrinkles, running vertically at the inside and horizontally at the outside. The vertebrae were amphicoelous and constricted at the waist, with a length of about three centimetres and somewhat taller than wide in cross-section. The scute was ornamented with a fan-shaped pattern of splitting ridges.

== Phylogeny ==
Leidy himself believed Omosaurus to be a marine reptile, probably a plesiosaur, suspecting the remains were referable to some already named genus. In 1902, Frederick Augustus Lucas recognised the fossils as "crocodilian" in nature and placed Omosaurus in the Crocodilia. At the same time he affirmed the priority over Omosaurus (Owen 1875), which stegosaur was by him renamed to Dacentrurus. Today, Omosaurus is commonly listed as a nomen dubium, a possible member of the Phytosauria.
