= Inclusive =

Inclusive may refer to:

- Inclusive disjunction, A or B or both
- Inclusive fitness, in evolutionary theory, how many kin are supported including non-descendants
- Inclusive tax, includes taxes owed as part of the base
- Inclusivism, a form of religious pluralism
- Inclusive first person, in linguistics

== See also ==
- Inclusion (disambiguation)
