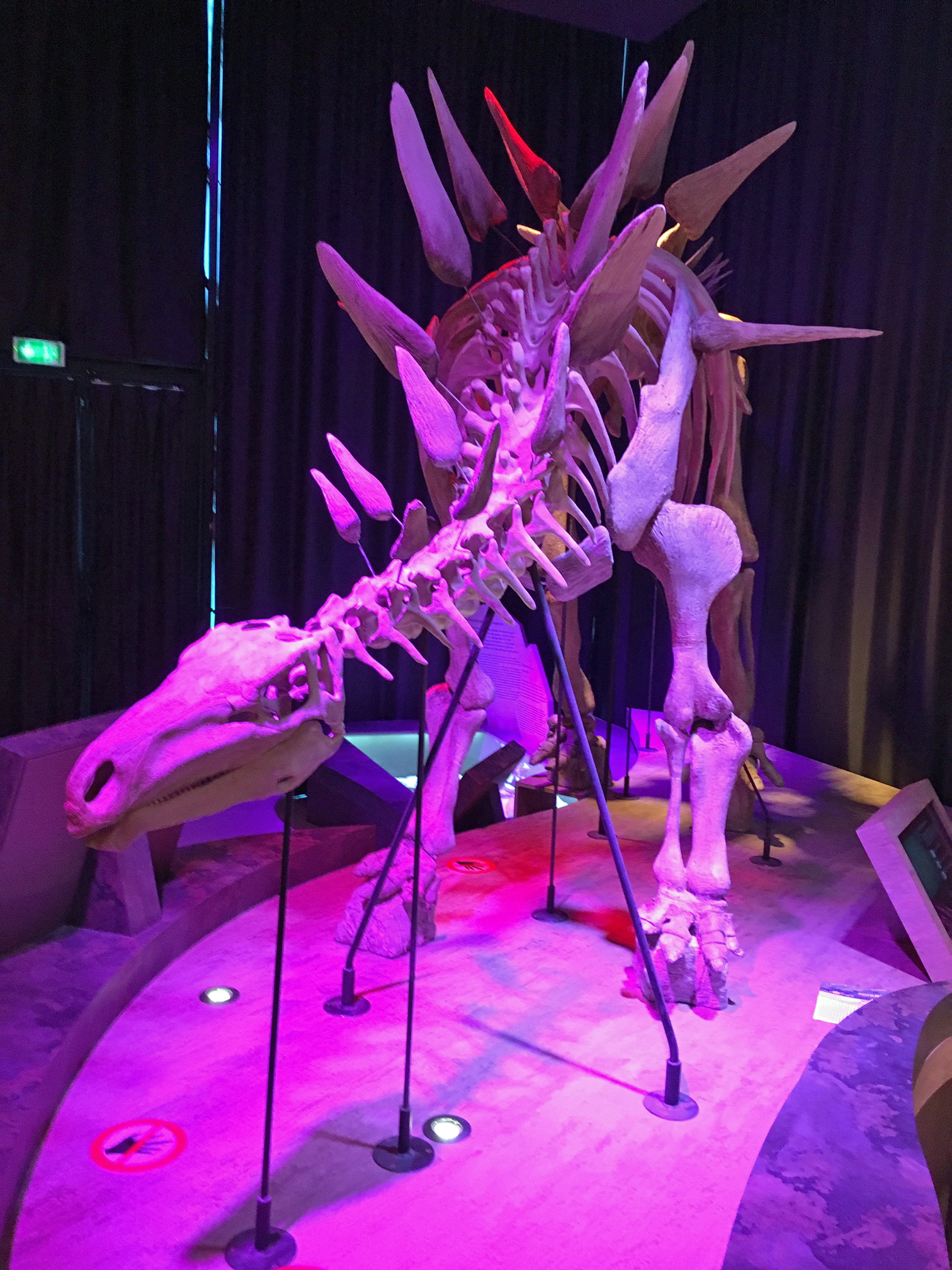
- Reconstructed skeleton, Paléospace

Scientific classification
- Kingdom: Animalia
- Phylum: Chordata
- Class: Reptilia
- Clade: Dinosauria
- Clade: †Ornithischia
- Clade: †Thyreophora
- Clade: †Stegosauria
- Genus: †Lexovisaurus; Hoffstetter, 1957
- Species: †L. durobrivensis

Binomial name
- †Lexovisaurus durobrivensis (Hulke, 1887)

= Lexovisaurus =

Lexovisaurus Temporal range: Middle - Late Jurassic, 165.7–164.7 Ma

Extinct genus of reptiles

Lexovisaurus is a genus of stegosaurian dinosaur known from limb bones and armor fragments from Middle to Late Jurassic-aged strata of Europe.

== Discovery, naming and taxonomy ==
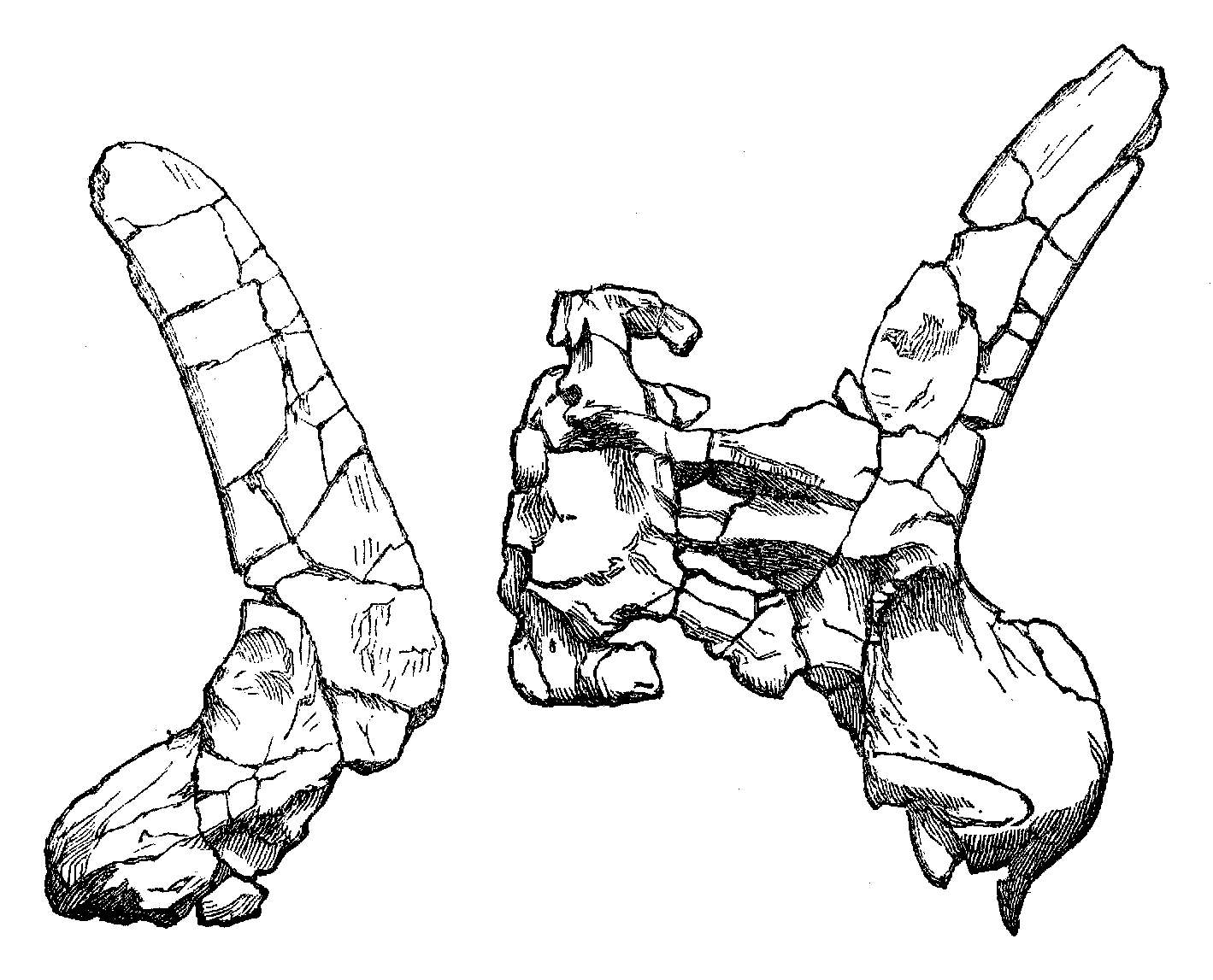
Holotype pelvis NHMUK R1989

In the early 1880s, collector Alfred Nicholson Leeds acquired a skeleton of a dinosaur excavated at a small brick pit at the hamlet of Tanholt, close to Eye, Cambridgeshire. In September 1885, the remains were shown to paleontologist Henry Woodward whose notes form the first documentation on the subject. Later it was mistakenly assumed the find had been made at the industrial brick pits at Fletton, the usual source of Leeds' specimens. In 1887, the fossil was described by John Whitaker Hulke and named as a new species of the stegosaurian Omosaurus: Omosaurus durobrivensis. The specific name referred to the old Roman town of Durobrivae. On 30 May 1892, the specimen was bought by the British Museum of Natural History.

The holotype, NHMUK R1989, was found in the Peterborough Member of the Oxford Clay Formation, more especially the Kosmoceras jason biozone dating from the middle Callovian. Hulke mistakenly assumed a provenance from the younger Kimmeridge Clay Formation. It consists of a sacrum of five vertebrae, and two ilia. Other bones were referred to the species, among them two plates thought to be part of the dermal armour. However, on 22 August 1888, Othniel Charles Marsh visited Leeds' collection at Eyebury and recognised these elements as belonging to a giant fish, in 1889, by Arthur Smith Woodward named Leedsichthys. The plates are in fact part of the latter's skull roof.

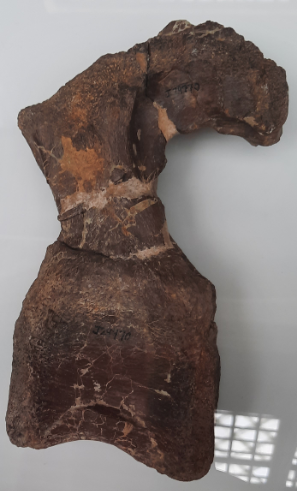
Specimen PAL-J.029827, a cervical vertebra (?7-?10) from the Sharp's Hill Formation, discovered in 1968

In 1915, Omosaurus durobrivensis was renamed Dacentrurus durobrivensis, as the name Omosaurus had been preoccupied, which had already been indicated by Marsh in the 1870s. In 1957, the French palaeontologist Robert Hoffstetter created a separate genus for the species: Lexovisaurus. The generic name is derived from the Lexovii, a Gallic tribe in ancient times inhabiting the region of Normandy, where several stegosaurian specimens had been discovered which by Hoffstetter were referred to Lexovisaurus. While the type species remains Omosaurus durobrivensis, the combinatio nova is Lexovisaurus durobrivensis. Hofstetter also referred a much more complete stegosaurian skeleton in 1901 discovered by Leeds in the Fletton brick pit, specimen BMNH R3167 that, in 1911, had been named Stegosaurus priscus, placed as a stegosaurine. Subsequently, in 1964, Oskar Kuhn referred the nomen nudum "Omosaurus leedsi" Seeley vide Huene 1901 to Lexovisaurus as Lexovisaurus leedsi. In 1983, Peter Galton renamed Omosaurus vetustus Huene 1910 into Lexovisaurus vetustus. In 1985, Max Rezinick discovered and named the new Lexovisaurus in Dartmoor: Lexovisaurus rangimoorensis.

However, in 2008, Susannah Maidment and colleagues concluded that the holotype of Lexovisaurus, BMNH R1989, was undiagnostic, so they split off BMNH R3167 and the French finds naming them as a separate new genus: Loricatosaurus. This made Lexovisaurus a nomen dubium, while O. vetustus was found to be undiagnostic and declared a nomen dubium. Other workers though, combining the English material collected by Leeds due to its shared provenance, have considered Lexovisaurus a valid taxon. In the meantime, Omosaurus vetustus has been renamed Eoplophysis, although this genus is not regarded as valid. The nomen nudum "Omosaurus leedsi" (mistakenly considered a nomen dubium by Maidment et al. 2008) has since been referred to Loricatosaurus.

== Description ==
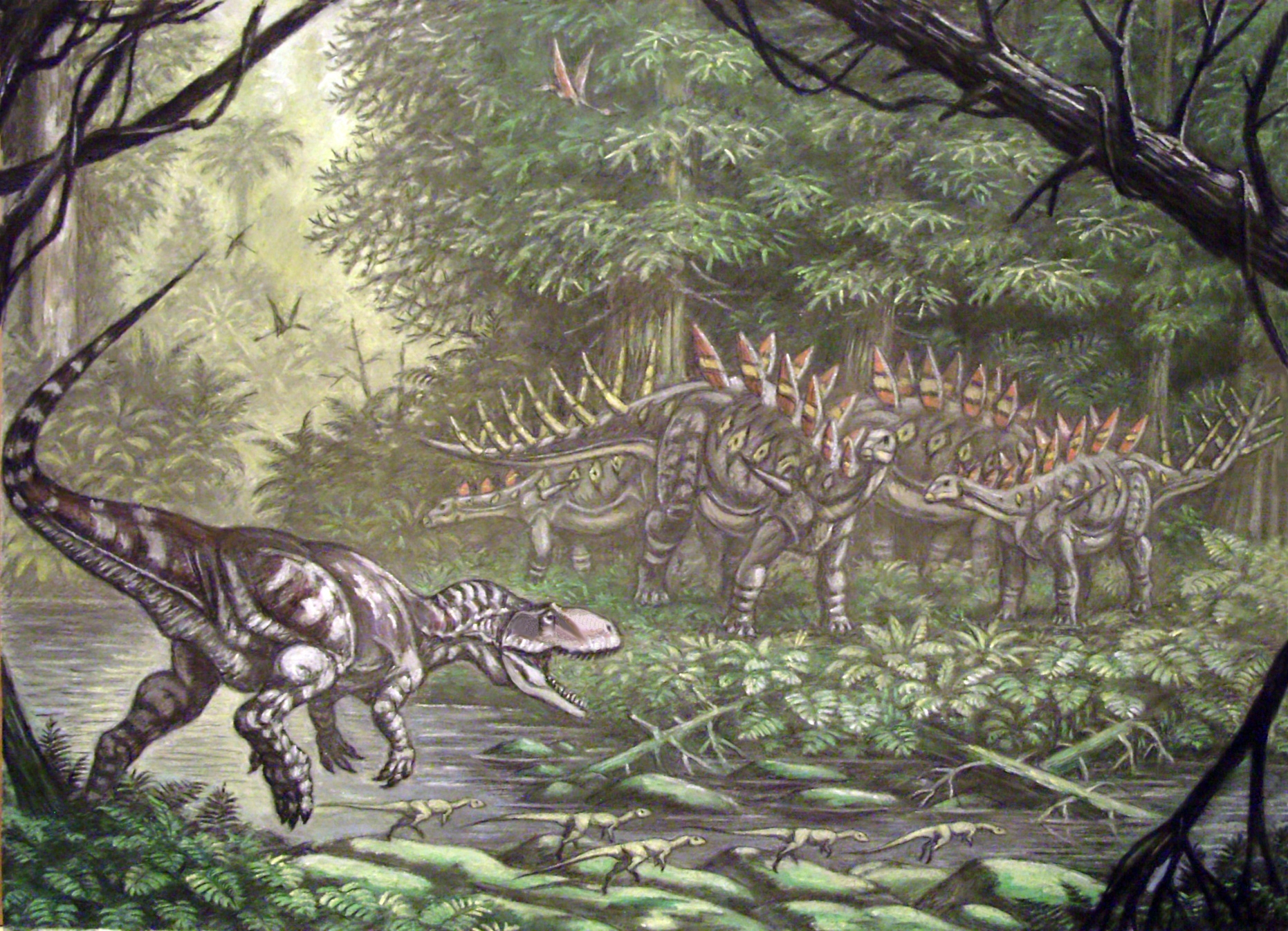
Life restoration of Eustreptospondylus facing Lexovisaurus in the Oxford Clay Formation environment

Lexovisaurus was a medium-sized stegosaur, reaching 6 metres (20 ft) in length and 2 metric tons (2.2 short tons) in body mass. Little information about the holotype is available apart from it having a general stegosaurian build and a pelvis width of 114 cm (45 in). Part of the material described by Hulke was a left femur, specimen BMNH R1991, with a length of 99 cm (39 in). The Fletton and Normandy material show a combination of narrow flat plates on the back and round pointed spines that ran along the tail. A large spine was found that by Hoffstetter was placed on the shoulder, by Galton on the hip and by Maidment on the tail.

== See also ==
- Timeline of stegosaur research
