= Dinópolis =

Coordinates: 40°19′57″N 1°04′52″W

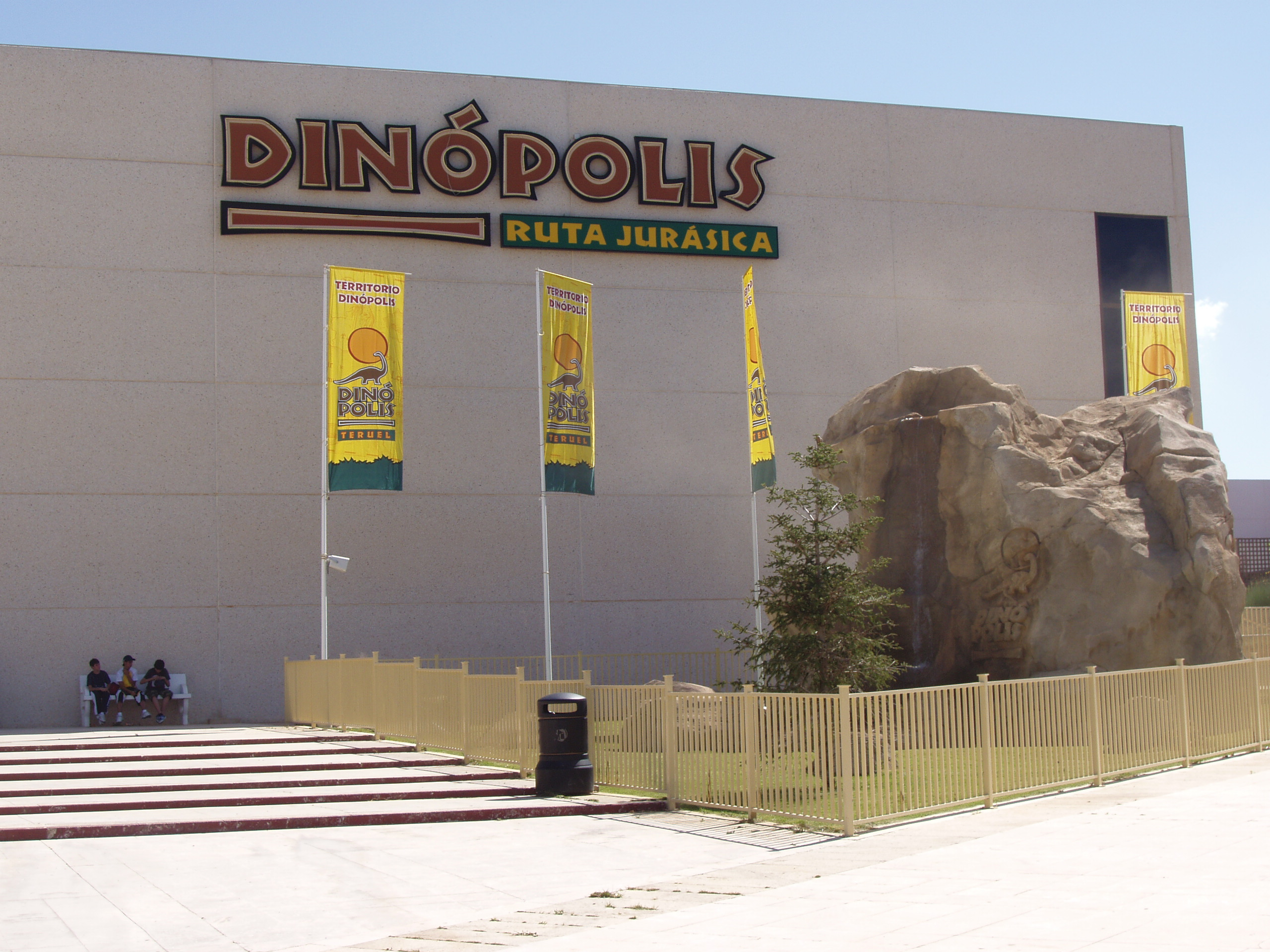
- Dinópolis Teruel
- Established: 2001
- Location: Avda. Sagunto, Teruel, Spain
- Type: Paleontology

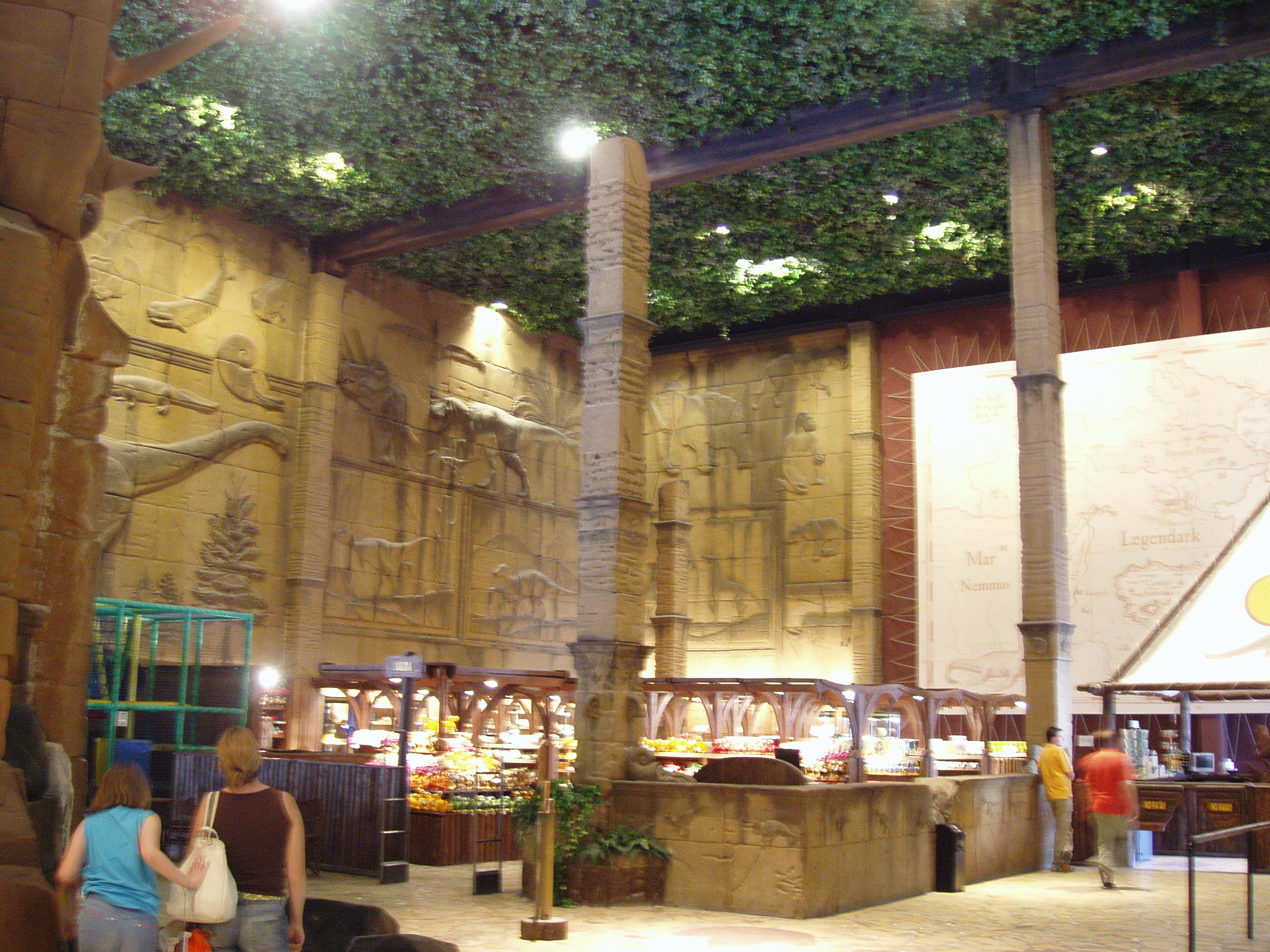
The entrance hall.

Dinópolis, located in Teruel, Spain, is one of the largest museums of paleontology in the world. It also includes some attractions, restaurants and shows. The museum comprises three main exhibition halls and a research laboratory.

== History ==
In 1998, the provincial government of Aragón established a foundation with the aim of creating exhibition facilities for the growing collection of fossils found in Teruel, at the same time stimulating tourism and hereby funding future research. The first building was opened in June 2001, at Dinópolis Teruel.

== Exhibition halls ==
Dinópolis has the following exhibition halls:

- Aquatic Life Hall
- Dinosaur Hall
- Mammal Hall
- Hall of Meteorites

== Territorio Dinópolis ==
Dinópolis Teruel is part of a chain of eight such natural history museums and parks named Territorio Dinópolis, the seven others being Inhóspitak at Peñarroya de Tastavins, founded in 2003, Legendark at Galve (2003), Región Ambarina: at Rubielos de Mora (2004), Bosque Pétreo (2005) at Castellote, Mar Nummus, at Albarracín (2008), Titania at Riodeva (2012) and Valcaria at Ariño (2015).

== Research activities ==
Dinópolis has an active research team, called Fundación Conjunto Paleontológico de Teruel-Dinópolis or just Fundación Dinópolis. One of the achievements of this team has been the description of Turiasaurus riodevensis by Royo-Torres, Cobos & Alcala, 2006.

== In popular culture ==
- An episode of Historia de España is set in Dinópolis, and also in some outcrops in Teruel.
