= Priodontognathus =

Priodontognathus Temporal range: Late Jurassic, Oxfordian

Scientific classification
- Kingdom: Animalia
- Phylum: Chordata
- Class: Reptilia
- Clade: Dinosauria
- Clade: †Ornithischia
- Clade: †Thyreophora
- Clade: †Ankylosauria
- Genus: †Priodontognathus; Seeley, 1875
- Species: †P. phillipsii

Binomial name
- †Priodontognathus phillipsii (Seeley, 1869)

Synonyms
- Iguanodon phillipsii Seeley, 1869

Extinct genus of dinosaurs

Priodontognathus (meaning "saw tooth jaw") is a genus of ankylosaurian dinosaur possibly from the Late Jurassic (Oxfordian-aged) Lower Calcareous Grit of Yorkshire, England. It is a dubious genus based on a maxilla, and has been erroneously mixed up with iguanodonts and stegosaurs.

== History and taxonomy ==
English paleontologist Harry Govier Seeley, who described the genus, first mentioned the holotype (SMC B53408), a maxilla or upper jaw bone, in 1869. Seeley was at the time compiling a catalogue of the fossils of the Woodwardian Museum. Part of these formed the Forbes Collection that after the death of James Forbes-Young had in 1862 been donated to the University of Cambridge by his sons Charles Young and Henry Young. The provenance of this particular bone from that collection was unknown; first believed to be found near Tilgate from a Lower Cretaceous stratum, it was later thought to have been discovered somewhere near the coast of Yorkshire in a Jurassic layer. Seeley initially assumed that it was referable to Iguanodon, and named it Iguanodon Phillipsii. The specific name honoured geology professor John Phillips. The five inch long fragment lacked the teeth, only seventeen empty tooth sockets being visible. By 1875, after subsequent preparation had uncovered the replacement teeth within the jaw bone, Seeley had recognized that it was different, and so gave it the generic name Priodontognathus. The name is derived from Greek prion, "saw", odous, "tooth" and gnathos, "jaw", in recognition of the form of its teeth. Because the replacement teeth had not yet erupted, their serrations had not been worn down and many sharp denticula could be seen, shaped as the points of a saw.

Because armored dinosaurs were very poorly known at the time, he had little to compare it to, and in light of this it is not too surprising that he later, in 1893, had it mixed up with the stegosaurian Omosaurus (now Dacentrurus); stegosaurs are most closely related to the ankylosaurs within the Thyreophora. At this time, he named a species Omosaurus phillipsii based on a femur (YM 498), but also provisionally equated this species to Priodontognathus phillipsii, despite the two species being based on non-comparable material. This was extremely confusing as both shared the same specific name (see at the bottom). It led to a later misunderstanding by some authors, assuming Omosaurus phillipsii was nothing but Priodontognathus phillipsii reassigned to Omosaurus. However, this is precluded by the mere fact that both species have been based on different type specimens.

After this time, Priodontognathus was generally considered to be a stegosaurid, although at least one author, Baron Franz Nopcsa, recognized that it was not, and assigned it to "Acanthopholididae", which we would recognize as Nodosauridae. Alfred Sherwood Romer also recognized that it was an ankylosaurian, although he synonymized it with Hylaeosaurus.

Peter Galton reassessed the genus in 1980 and established that it was a distinct genus, which he compared to Priconodon and Sauropelta and assigned to Nodosauridae. While his assessment of it as a type of ankylosaurian has been accepted, his belief that it was valid was not, and it has been usually considered a dubious genus of uncertain ankylosaurian affinities since then.

=== "Omosaurus" phillipsii ===
As mentioned, Seeley named a femur Omosaurus phillipsii in 1893, which has become confused with this animal, due to being discussed in the same article (and considered to possibly be the same genus), and due to them having the same specific name. Omosaurus phillipsii, now known as "Dacentrurus" phillipsii or "Omosaurus" phillipsii (depending on how an author denotes dubious species), is a dubious species of stegosaurian from the Malton Oolite Member of the Corallian Oolite Formation, Slingsby, North Yorkshire. Galton (1983) found it to have no diagnostic features, and that its major significance was of being the only record then known of Oxfordian stegosaurians. The femur, which is in three pieces, is that of a juvenile.

== Paleobiology ==
As an ankylosaurian, Priodontognathus would have been a slow quadrupedal herbivore, built low to the ground, and possessing armor as a protective feature against theropods and other carnivores. It was a rather small animal, a few metres long; if the Oxfordian date is correct this might be seen as a feature shared with all early nodosaurids.

== Miscellany ==
The double "i" at the end of the specific name for both Priodontognathus and "Omosaurus" phillipsii is an old formulation and is today not done. The extra "i" has not been formally removed and is the only valid spelling under the International Code of Zoological Nomenclature, but authors sometimes leave it off. For that matter, as mentioned above regarding the name of "Omosaurus" phillipsi, Priodontognathus will sometimes be referred to as "Iguanodon" phillipsii. Seeley's original use of a capital to write Phillipsii is now no longer conventional, lower case being used for the beginning of all specific epithets even if they were derived from personal names, resulting in this case in a phillipsi.

== See also ==
- Timeline of ankylosaur research
