= Inclusion (Boolean algebra) =

In Boolean algebra, the inclusion relation $a\le b$ is defined as $ab'=0$ and is the Boolean analogue to the subset relation in set theory. Inclusion is a partial order.

The inclusion relation $a<b$ can be expressed in many ways:

- $a < b$
- $ab' = 0$
- $a' + b = 1$
- $b' < a'$
- $a+b = b$
- $ab = a$

The inclusion relation has a natural interpretation in various Boolean algebras: in the subset algebra, the subset relation; in arithmetic Boolean algebra, divisibility; in the algebra of propositions, material implication; in the two-element algebra, the set { (0,0), (0,1), (1,1) }.

Some useful properties of the inclusion relation are:

- $a \le a+b$
- $ab \le a$

The inclusion relation may be used to define Boolean intervals such that $a\le x\le b$. A Boolean algebra whose carrier set is restricted to the elements in an interval is itself a Boolean algebra.
