= Total subset =

Vector space in functional analysis

In mathematics, more specifically in functional analysis, a subset $T$ of a topological vector space $X$ is said to be a total subset of $X$ if the linear span of $T$ is a dense subset of $X.$ This condition arises frequently in many theorems of functional analysis.

== Examples ==
Unbounded self-adjoint operators on Hilbert spaces are defined on total subsets.

== See also ==
- Dense subset – Subset whose closure is the whole space
- Positive linear operator – Concept in functional analysis
- Topological vector spaces – Vector space with a notion of nearness
