= Gustave Lennier =

French naturalist, geologist, and explorer

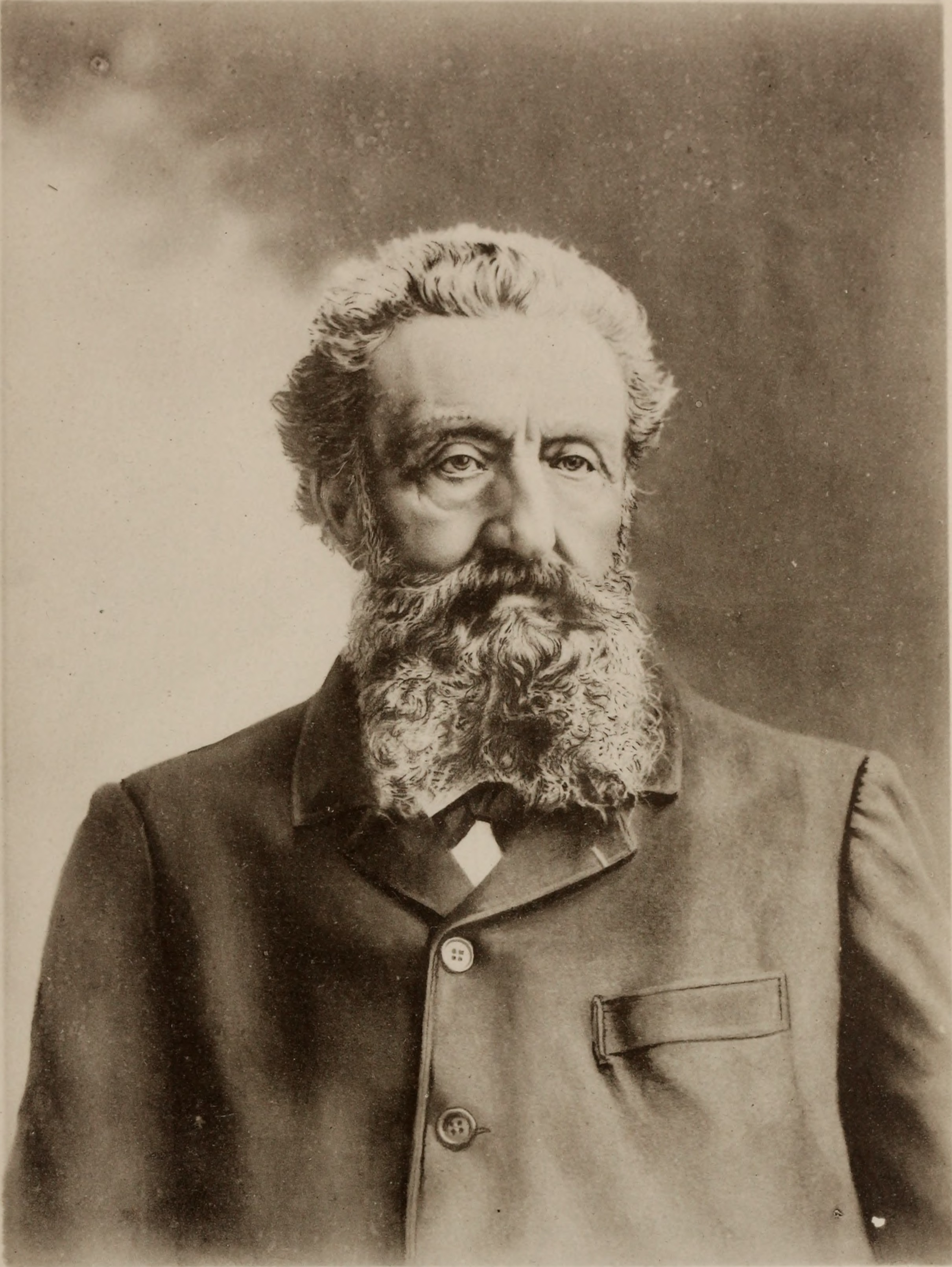
- Born: 26 February 1835; Le Havre, France
- Died: 19 November 1905 (aged 70)
- Known for: Iguanodon
- Scientific career
- Fields: Naturalist, Geologist
- Workplaces: Grande Loge de France

Gustave Lennier (1835–1905) was a French naturalist, geologist, and explorer active during the 19th century. He was born on February 26, 1835, in Le Havre, France, and died on November 19, 1905.

== Career and discoveries ==
Lennier was the founder and president of the Geological Society of Normandy (SGN) and a founding member of the Friends of the Le Havre Museum. He served as the curator of the Museum of Natural History and Ethnography of Le Havre. Lennier was a non-resident member of the Archaeological and Historical Society of the Manche in 1857 and a member of the Grande Loge de France. In 1862, Lennier was admitted to Société Havraise d'Etudes Diverses (Havraise Society of Diverse Studies, SHED), an academic learned society consisting of other individuals with literary, scientific, and artistic merits.

Lennier dedicated himself to the study of history and natural sciences. From 1855 to 1858, he explored the west coast of Africa, although the details of his explorations are not well documented.

One of his most notable discoveries occurred towards the end of the 19th century when he discovered the vertebrae of a prehistoric creature on the cliffs of "Bout du Monde"(eng: end of the world). He worked tirelessly to assemble these vertebrae and piece together the creature's form. His major work revolved around the discovery and study of the Iguanodon, a dinosaur from the Jurassic period. After the initial discovery of a few vertebrae, Lennier mounted an expedition to the site of the find, where he conducted an excavation to uncover the creature's fossilized remains. The dinosaur he discovered weighed 4 tonnes, stood 5 meters high, and was 7 meters long. Despite facing significant challenges and risks during the excavation process, Lennier demonstrated commitment to his work.

== Major works ==
Lennier's major works include:

- "Études Géologiques Et Paléontologiques Sur L'embouchure De La Seine Et Les Falaises De La Haute-Normandie" (Geological and Paleontological Studies on the Mouth of the Seine and the Cliffs of Upper Normandy). This work was recognized by the Imperial Society of Havraise of Various Studies and the Free Society of Emulation of Rouen.
- "L'estuaire De La Seine" (The Estuary of the Seine), published in 1885.
- "Description de la collection ethnographique océanienne" (Description of the Oceanic Ethnographic Collection), published in 1896.

== See also ==
- Iguanodon
- History of paleontology
