= Inclusion (taxonomy) =

Concept of taxonomy

In taxonomy, inclusion refers to the scope of a taxon, whether it be the trait describing rank and diversity, or a process of assigning or moving a taxon to be included within or absorbed by another taxon. This could occur as two separate species being found to be a single species or a genus being found to belong to a certain family.

Among the most inclusive taxonomic ranks are Domains, Kingdoms, and Phyla, while the least inclusive are Subspecies, followed by Species.
