= Frederic Augustus Lucas =

American curator

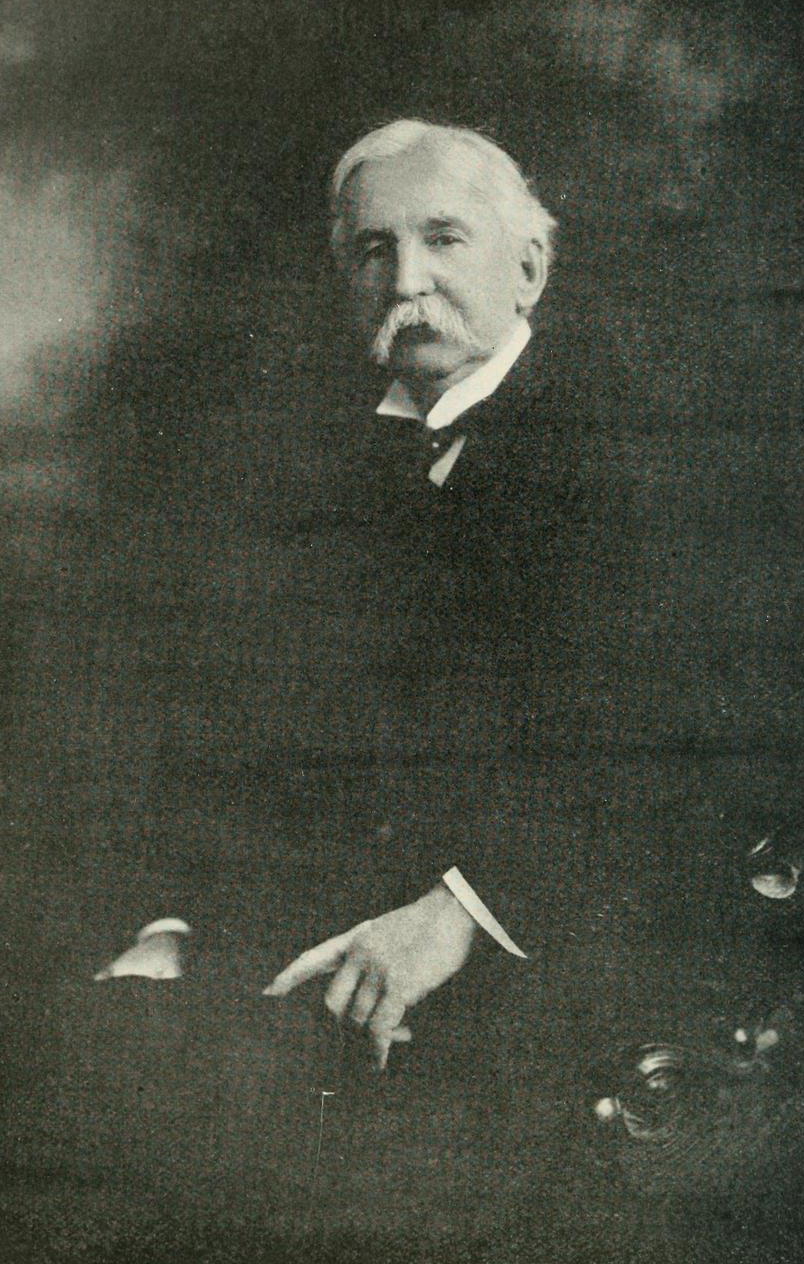
- Lucas in 1918

Signature
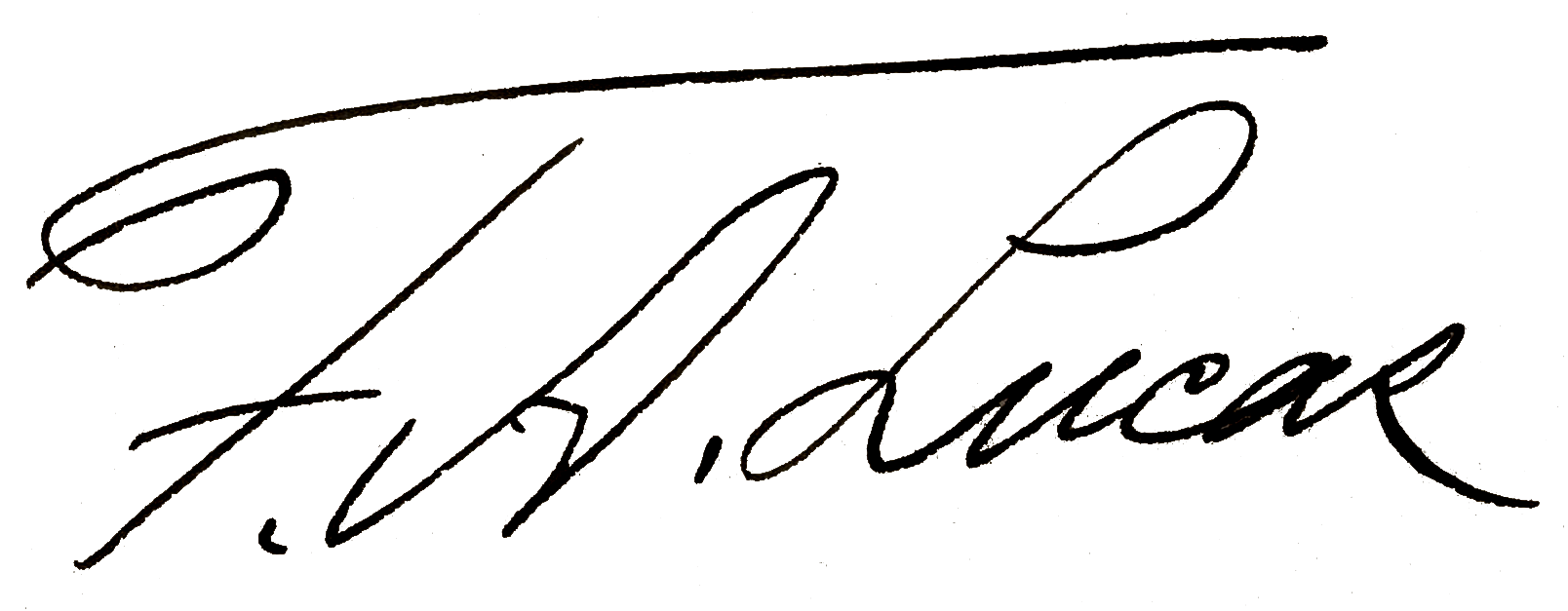

Frederic Augustus Lucas (March 25, 1852 – February 9, 1929) was a zoologist and taxidermist who served as a curator of the Brooklyn Museum and director of the American Museum of Natural History. He was an expert on the osteology and anatomy of birds. He wrote several popular book on extinct animals.

== Biography ==
Lucas was the son of Eliza Oliver and Augustus Henry, a merchant seaman and captain of a sailing vessel, whose grandmother Ruby Fuller was a descendant of Dr Samuel Fuller of the Mayflower. He accompanied his father on two long voyages, the first (1861–1862) at the age of nine and the second (1869–1870) when he was 17. He became fascinated with sea life, especially the marine birds, many of which he was able to snare, skin and prepare as mounted specimens. From this he developed an ambition to become a taxidermist and entered Ward's Natural Science Establishment at Rochester, New York, to learn the techniques involved.

He did not have a formal training in science and after 11 years spent at Ward's, he bragged that, "during those days he never read through any scientific book, never attended a course of scientific lectures, never did an hour's laboratory work, nor made a microscope slide", his interests being confined to avian osteology and the mounting and tagging of specimens for exhibition. Yet his competency in this area was sufficient to provide him an appointment to mount and prepare avian specimens at the National Museum of Natural History in Washington, DC in 1882, at the age of 30, where he was given the title of curator.

Lucas was prominent figure in the development of American museums, which sought to bring Natural Science to the American public. Lucas served as osteologist and curator for the National Museum of Natural History in Washington, D.C. from 1882 to 1904. Lucas served as Curator-in-Chief of the Brooklyn Museum in Brooklyn, New York from 1904 to 1911, and subsequently enjoyed an appointment as director at the American Museum of Natural History in Manhattan from 1911 to 1923 and honorary director from 1924 to his death in 1929.

== Career ==
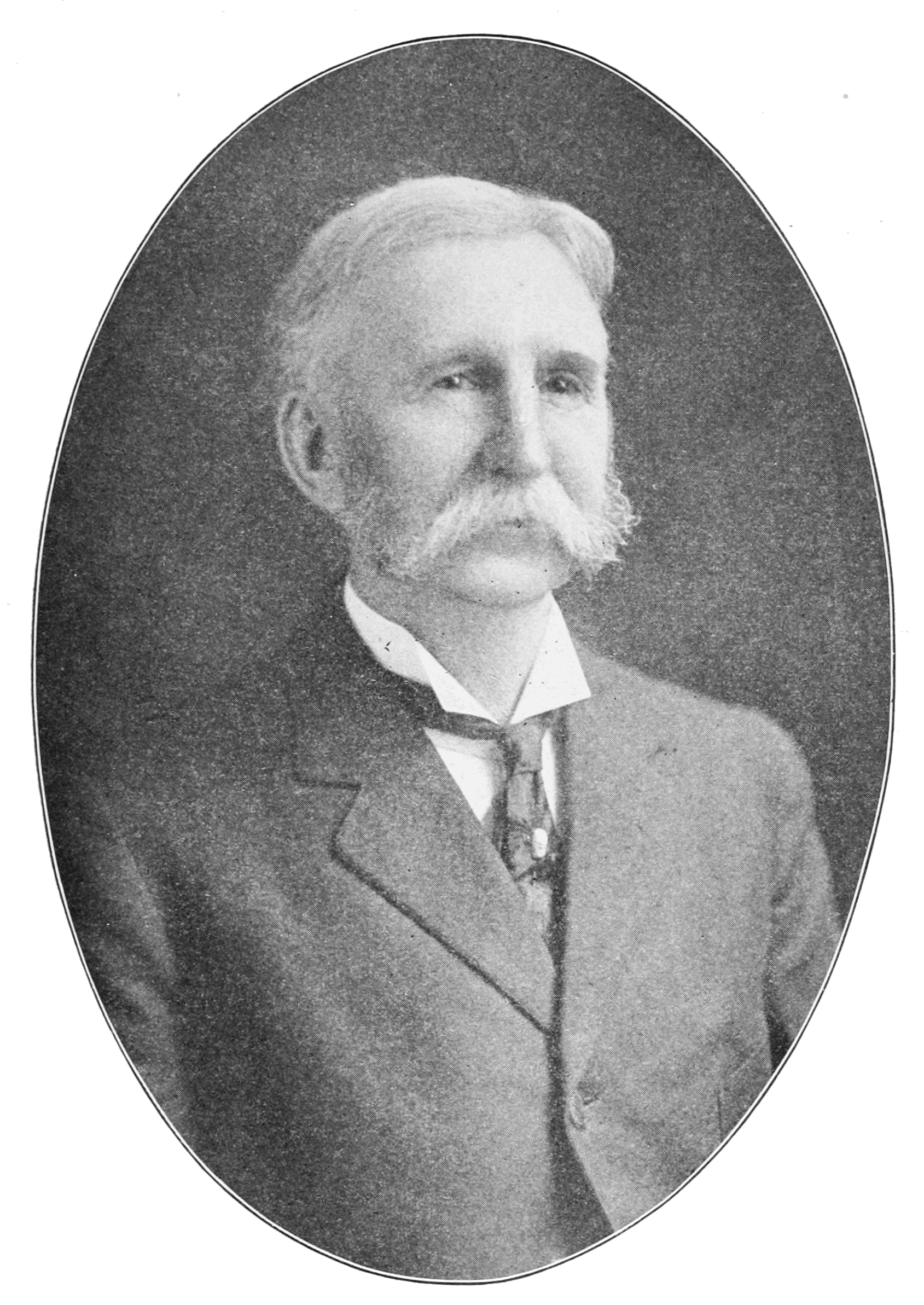
Frederic A. Lucas in 1911

Lucas came to be recognized by his contemporaries as an authority on ancient animals. His description of himself was that of "all round" naturalist, a specimen he regarded regretfully as fast disappearing. Because of his associations at the National Museum and his past experience at Ward's Establishment, he was able associate and work with many men of this type including William Hornaday, Carl Akeley, Henry B. Ward, Arthur Howell, among others, people whose recognition was based on their writings as explorers rather than as academicians. Lucas never regarded himself as deficient in that respect.

=== Marine Animal Advocacy ===
==== Great Auk Expedition ====
In 1885, Lucas proposed a collection expedition to Funk Island to the National Museum, for the purpose of collecting skeletal remains of the great auk, which had been extinct since 1852. The proposal was not carried out due to the expected time and investment required. However, on 2 July 1887, Lucas was detailed to join the USFC Grampus on an expedition north to investigate reports of mackerel. While the ship passed northern islands, he collected biological specimens, aiming primarily to retrieve any remains of the extinct bird. The expedition returned September 2, partially successful in collection efforts. Thousands of bones of varying quality were collected but were able to only form around a dozen complete skeletons of the extinct bird, which were then distributed to various natural history museums. The great auk was later included, among other endangered and extinct animals, in a report by Lucas assessing representation of the animals in the collection of the National Museum. He also decried the mass death of animals from manmade causes and argued for protective measures to prevent extinction within the report.

==== Fur Seal Commission Member ====
In 1896, due to his experience in the National Museum, Lucas was appointed by President Grover Cleveland to the Joint High Commission of the Fur Seal, alongside American scientists Charles H. Townsend, Leonhard Stejneger, and David S. Jordan, the leader of the commission, and British scientists D'Arey W. Thompson and James M. Macoun. The commission was tasked with investigating the condition of fur seal herds at the Pribilof Islands in the Bering Sea. In seeing firsthand the decimation of the herds, Lucas began a personal campaign advocating for the animal, interjecting environmentalist themes into the label of a fur seal taxidermy group directed by him and displayed in the Brooklyn Museum. In 1909, Lucas was appointed to the U.S. Department of Commerce and Labor Fur Seal Advisory Board, alongside fellow members from past commissions including Jordan, Townsend, Stejneger, Edward W. Sims, and Clinton H. Merriam. The board advocated for a complete ban on pelagic hunting, but also recommended the continuation of land hunting, as without herd management policies, fighting amongst the surplus male population would endanger the female and young seals. Despite this advocacy, the North Pacific Fur Seal Convention of 1911 was signed into law, that, despite banning pelagic hunting, also enacted a mortarium on fur seal hunting for five years. Further controversy over the issue led to another scientific commission to the Pribilof Islands by the Secretary of Commerce in 1914, whose discoveries led to a conclusion that supported and vindicated the board and its proposed method of herd management.

=== Scientific Writings ===
After instruction in the techniques of scientific writing and manuscript preparation by a friend early in his career, he published more than 350 articles, primarily in the area of avian osteology but also relating to natural history and the role of the museum and public education. Lucas also contributed heavily to several encyclopedias, writing descriptions for animals, relying primarily on his own observations rather than other textual sources.

== Personal life ==
Frederic Lucas died on February 9, 1929, at his home in Flushing, New York at the age of 76. He was buried at Plymouth, Massachusetts. He was married to Annie Edgar in 1884 and they had two daughters.
