= Timeline of ankylosaur research =

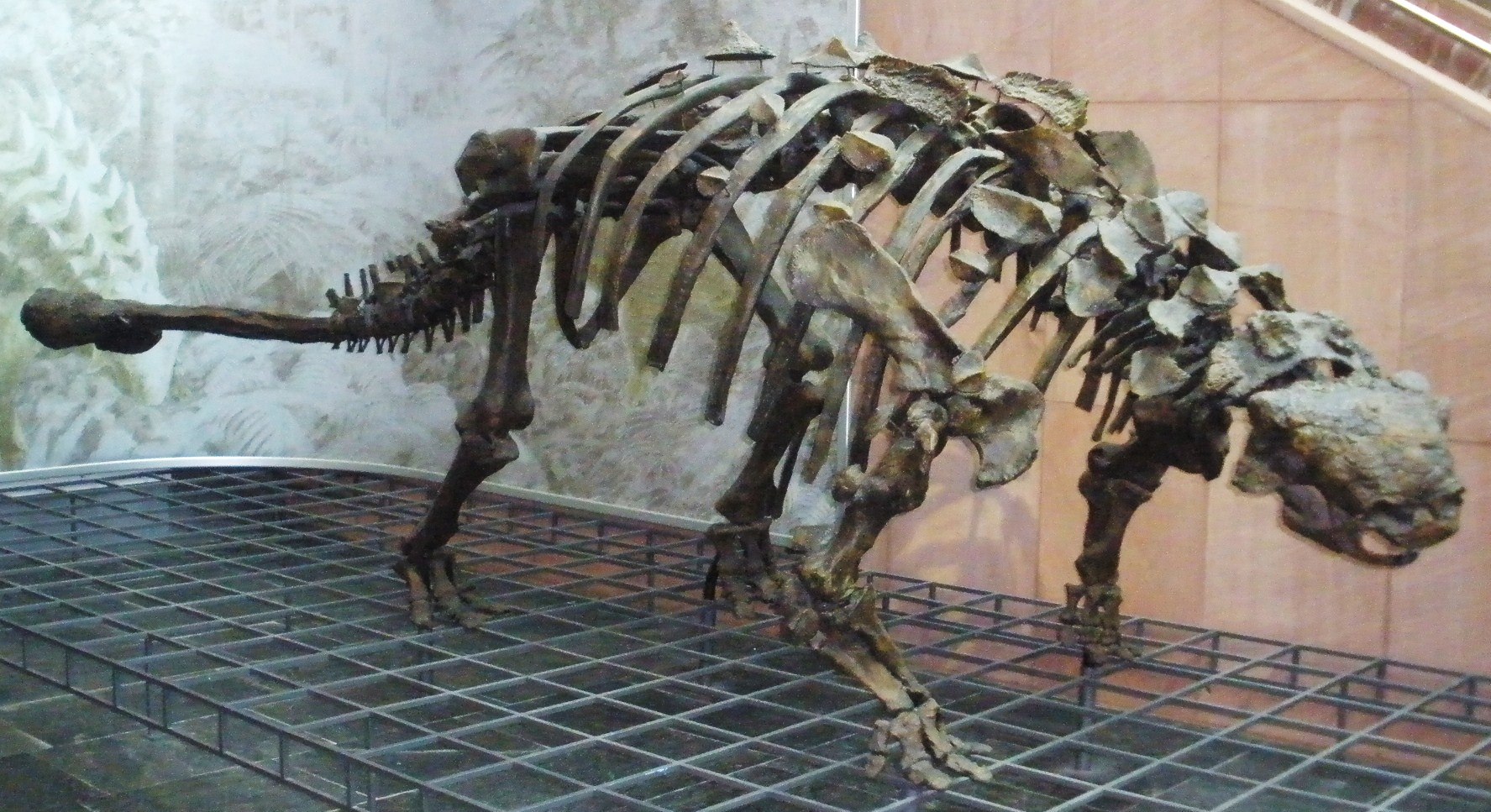
Skeletal mounts of the ankylosaur Scolosaurus

This timeline of ankylosaur research is a chronological listing of events in the history of paleontology focused on the ankylosaurs, quadrupedal herbivorous dinosaurs who were protected by a covering bony plates and spikes and occasionally by a clubbed tail. Although formally trained scientists did not begin documenting ankylosaur fossils until the early 19th century, Native Americans had a long history of contact with these remains, which were generally interpreted through a mythological lens. The Delaware people have stories about smoking the bones of ancient monsters in a magic ritual to have wishes granted and ankylosaur fossils are among the local fossils that may have been used like this. The Native Americans of the modern southwestern United States tell stories about an armored monster named Yeitso that may have been influenced by local ankylosaur fossils. Likewise, ankylosaur remains are among the dinosaur bones found along the Red Deer River of Alberta, Canada where the Piegan people believe that the Grandfather of the Buffalo once lived.

The first scientifically documented ankylosaur remains were recovered from Early Cretaceous rocks in England and named Hylaeosaurus armatus by Gideon Mantell in 1833. However, the Ankylosauria itself would not be named until Henry Fairfield Osborn did so in 1923 nearly a hundred years later. Prior to this, the ankylosaurs had been considered members of the Stegosauria, which included all armored dinosaurs when Othniel Charles Marsh named the group in 1877. It was not until 1927 that Alfred Sherwood Romer implemented the modern use of the name Stegosauria as specifically pertaining to the plate-backed and spike-tailed dinosaurs of the Jurassic that form the ankylosaurs' nearest relatives. The next major revision to ankylosaur taxonomy would not come until Walter Coombs divided the group into the two main families paleontologists still recognize today; the nodosaurids and ankylosaurids. Since then, many new ankylosaur genera and species have been discovered from all over the world and continue to come to light. Many fossil ankylosaur trackways have also been recognized.

== Prescientific ==
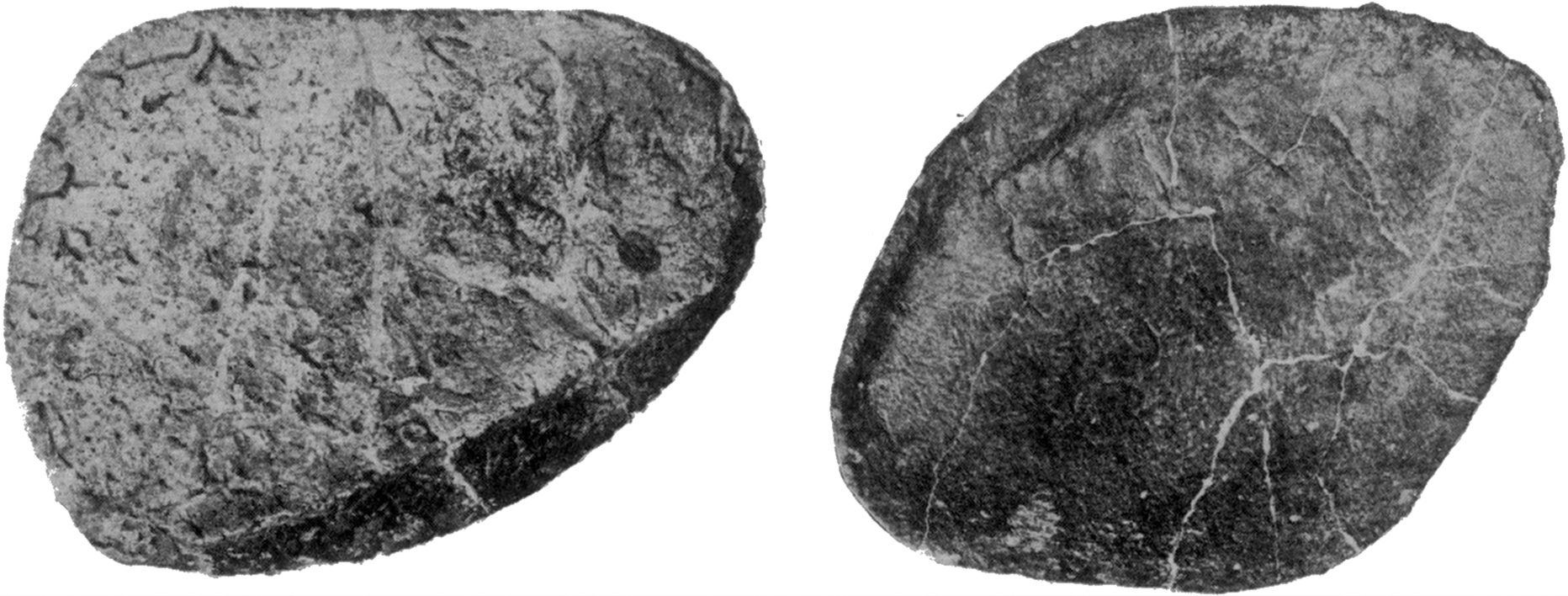
Osteoderms of Ankylosaurus

- The Delaware people of what is now New Jersey or Pennsylvania had a tradition regarding a hunting party that returned with a piece of an ancient bone supposedly belonging to a monster that killed humans. One of the village's wise men instructed people to burn bits of the bone in clay spoons with tobacco and make a wish while the concoction was still smoking. This ritual could bestow such favors as success in hunting, long life, and health for one's children. This tale might be inspired by local fossils, which include ankylosaurs, Coelosaurus, Dryptosaurus, and Hadrosaurus.
- Traditional Navajo creation mythology portrays modern Earth as the most recent of a series of worlds. They believe that the earlier worlds were inhabited by monsters that were killed with lightning bolts wielded by the heroic Monster Slayers. The most terrifying monster of the old worlds was the Big Gray Monster, Yeitso. The Navajo of Arizona feared fossil remains, attributing them to his corpse. They believe that Yeitso's ghost still haunts his remains. Yeitso's flint-like scales may have been inspired by the fossilized armored plates of various prehistoric creatures that once lived in what is now the western US. Ankylosaurs like Ankylosaurus are one such potential candidate for the source of Yeitso's armored hide. Others include non-ankylosaurs like the Permian amphibian Eryops, Triassic phytosaurs and Desmatosuchus, as well as other armored dinosaurs like Scutellosaurus or Stegosaurus.
- The Piegan people of Alberta attributed the fossils of dinosaurs to the "grandfather of the buffalo" they left offerings of cloth and tobacco to this mythical creature near the Red Deer River. Ankylosaur remains are among those preserved in the area that helped inspire this legend and associated practice, as are the remains of ceratopsians, hadrosaurs, and carnivorous theropods.

== 19th century ==
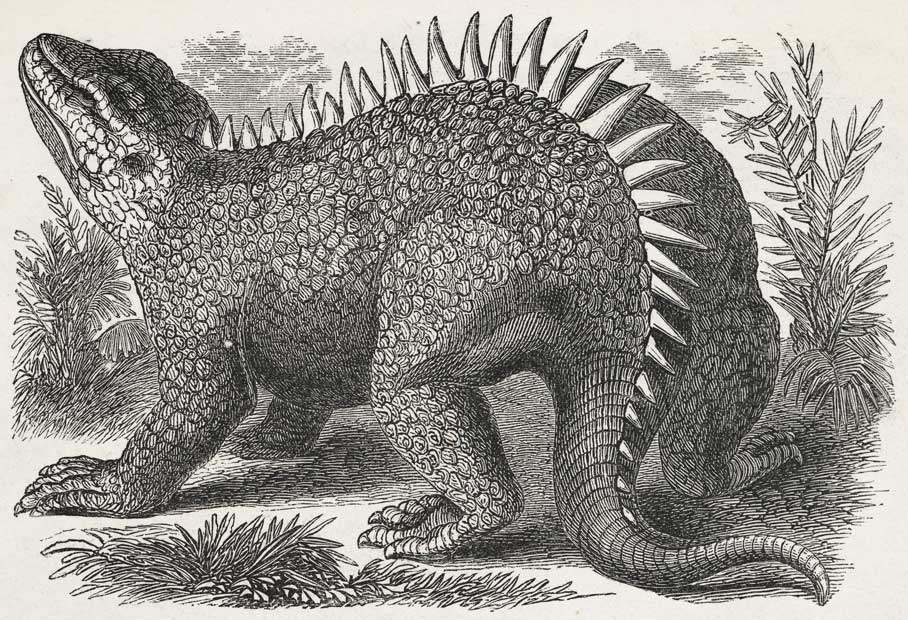
Early artistic restoration of Hylaeosaurus armatus

=== 1830s ===
==== 1832 ====
- Quarry workers discovered a fossilized partial skeleton. The remains were sent to paleontologist Gideon Mantell, who recognized that they represented a significant scientific discovery.
- Mantell reported the specimen discovered by quarry workers that would later be formally named Hylaeosaurus to the Geological Society.

==== 1833 ====
- Gideon Mantell described the new genus and species Hylaeosaurus armatus. This was the first ankylosaur ever discovered, although the group itself would not be recognized and named for many years.

=== 1840s ===
==== 1842 ====
===== Early April =====
- Sir Richard Owen published his second report on British fossil reptiles, wherein he formally named the Dinosauria. Hylaeosaurus was included as a founding member and was the third dinosaur to be named.

==== 1843 ====
- Fitzinger described the new species Hylaeosaurus mantellii.

==== 1844 ====
- Mantell described the new species Hylaeosaurus oweni.

=== 1850s ===
==== 1856 ====
- Joseph Leidy described the new genus and species Palaeoscincus costatus. He considered it to be an herbivore.

==== 1858 ====
- Sir Richard Owen published a study on Hylaeosaurus.

=== 1860s ===
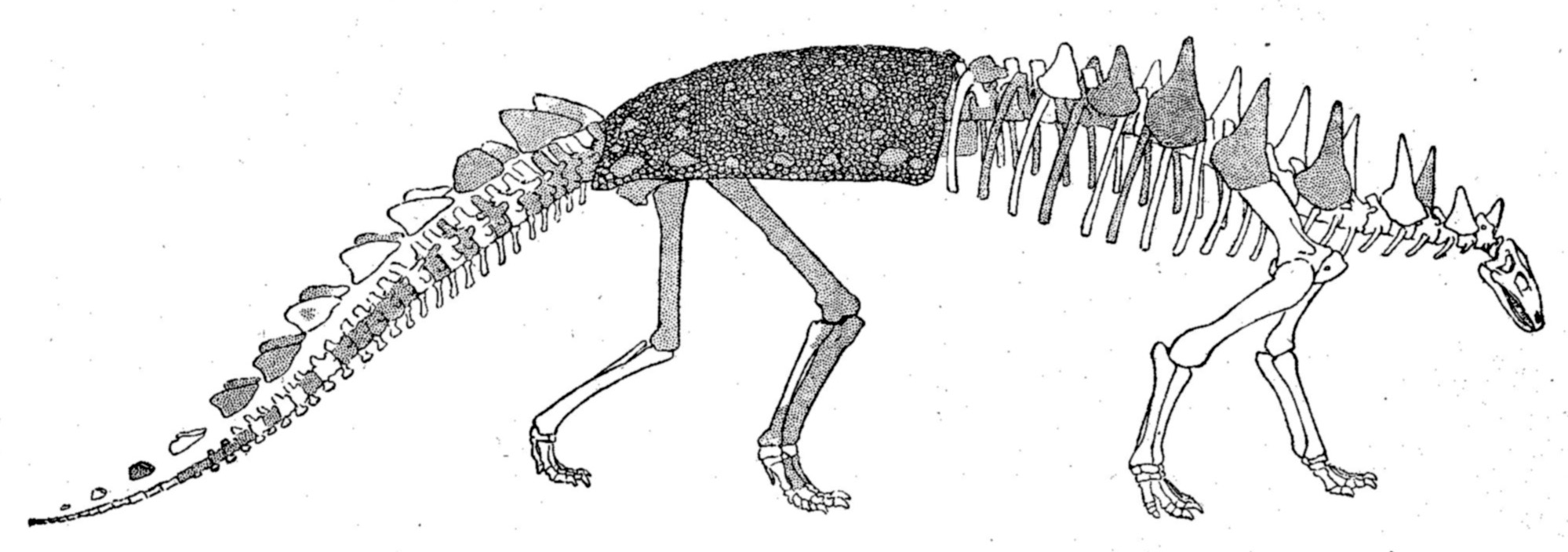
Early skeletal reconstruction of Polacanthus foxii skeletal restoration by Franz Nopcsa von Felső-Szilvás

==== 1865 ====
- Reverend William Fox discovered the Polacanthus type specimen.

==== 1867 ====
- Sir Richard Owen described the new genus Polacanthus. He also described the new genus and species Acanthopholis horridus.

==== 1869 ====
- Harry Govier Seeley described the new species Acanthopholis eucercus and A. macrocercus and A. platypus and A. stereocercus. He also described the new genus and species Cryptosaurus eumerus. He also described the new species Iguanodon phillipsii.

=== 1870s ===
==== 1871 ====
- Bunzel described the new genus and species Struthiosaurus austriacus. He also described the new genus and species Danubiosaurus anceps.

==== 1875 ====
- Seeley erected the new genus Priodontognathus to house the species Iguanodon phillipsii.

==== 1879 ====
- Seeley described the new genus and species Anoplosaurus curtonotus and Anoplosaurus major. Seeley also described the new genus and species Eucercosaurus tanyspondylus. He also described the new genus and species Syngonosaurus macrocercus.

=== 1880s ===
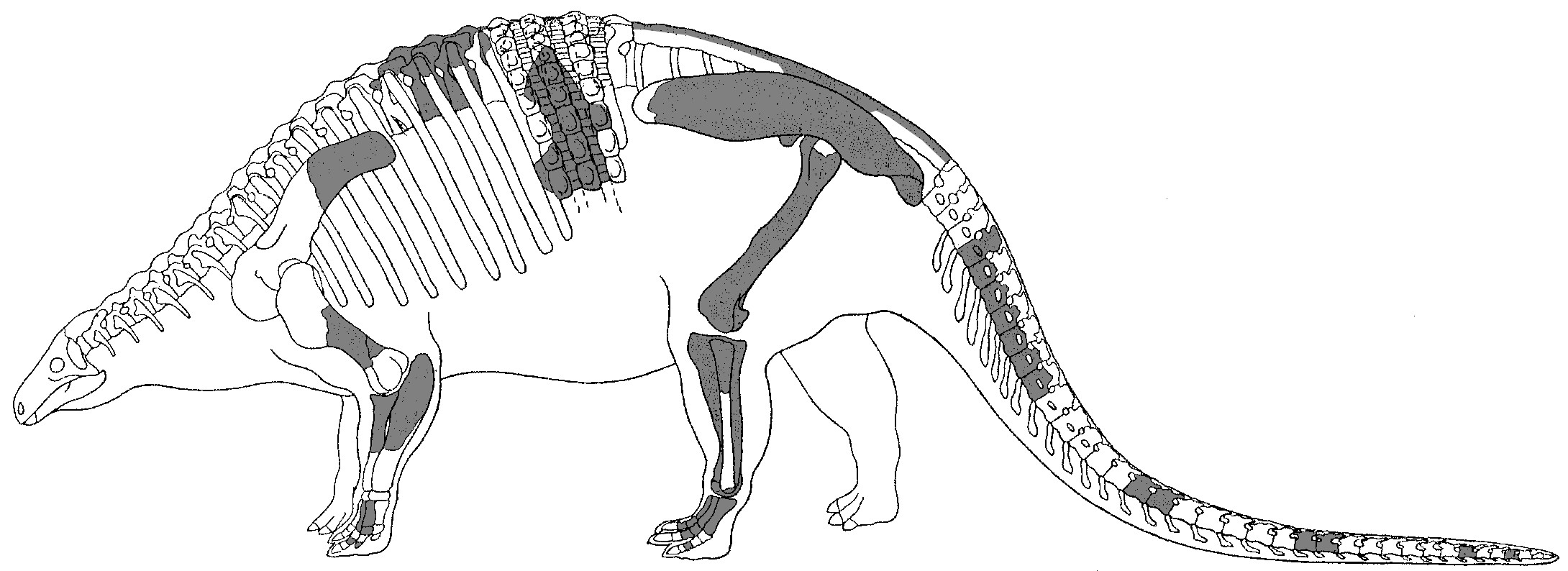
Early restoration of a Nodosaurus textilis skeleton

==== 1881 ====
- Seeley described the new genus Crataeomus, with two new species: C. lepidophorus and C. pawlowitschii. He also described the new genus and species Hoplosaurus ischyrus, the new genus and species Pleuropeltis suessi, and the new genus and species Rhadinosaurus alcinus.
- Hulke described the new species Hylaeosaurus foxii.

==== 1882 ====
- The British Museum of Natural History bought a large number of fossils from Rev. Fox, including the Polacanthus type specimen.

==== 1888 ====
- Othniel Charles Marsh described the new genus and species Priconodon crassus.

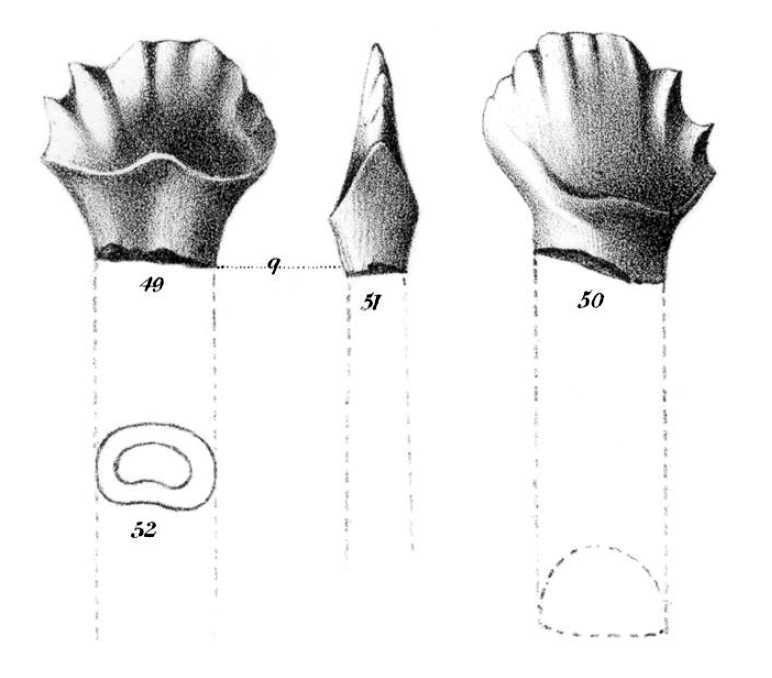
Illustration of the Palaeoscincus costatus holotype tooth

==== 1889 ====
- Marsh described the new genus and species Nodosaurus textilis.
- Richard Lydekker described the new genus Cryptodraco to house the species Cryptosaurus eumerus.

=== 1890s ===
==== 1890 ====
- Marsh named the Nodosauridae. He regarded them as relatives of the stegosaurs due to the shared presence of bony plates embedded in the skin.

==== 1892 ====
- Marsh described the new genus and species Palaeoscincus latus.

==== 1893 ====
- Lydekker described the new genus and species Sarcolestes leedsi.

== 20th century ==
=== 1900s ===
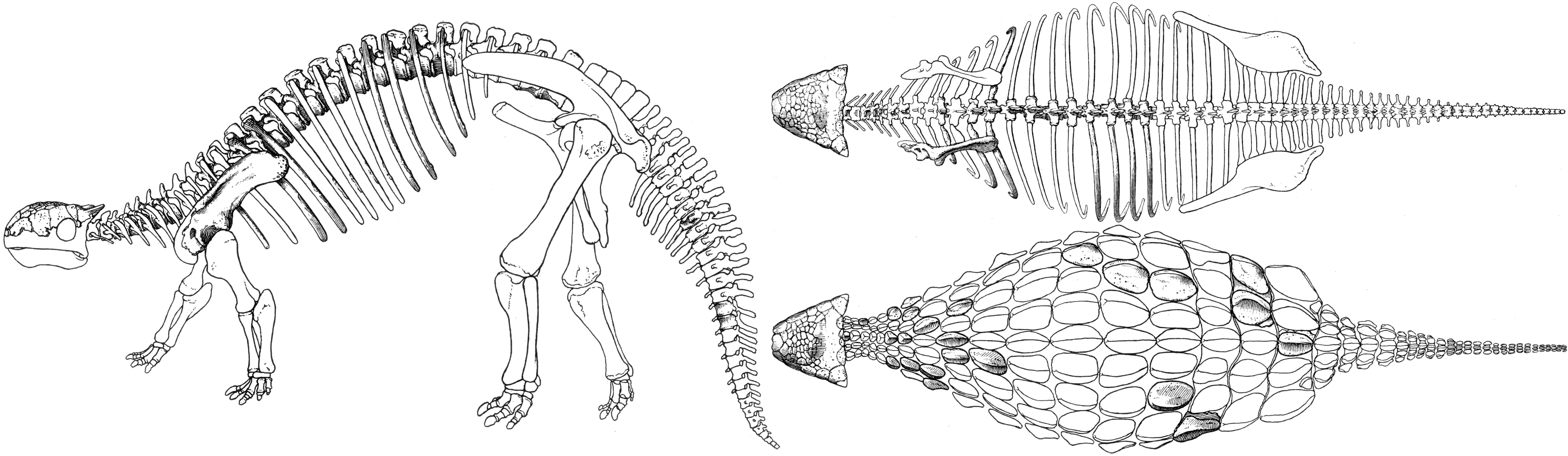
Artistic skeletal reconstruction of Ankylosaurus (AMNH 5895) by Barnum Brown, 1908, before the tail club was known

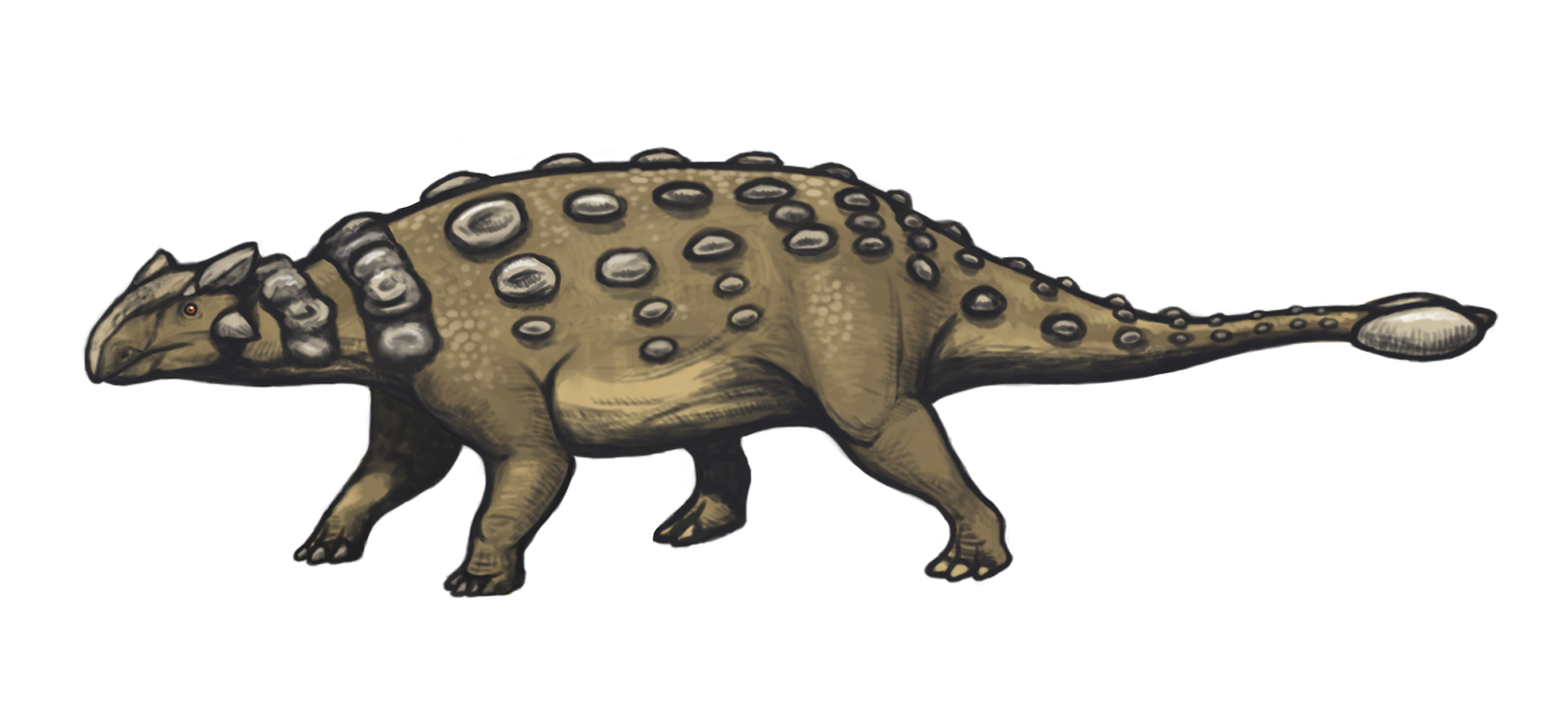
Artistic restoration of Ankylosaurus magniventris

==== 1901 ====
- F. A. Lucas described the new species Stegosaurus marshi, and later reclassified it as Polacanthus marshi.

==== 1902 ====
- Lawrence Lambe described the new genus and species Stereocephalus tutus. He also described the new species Palaeoscincus asper. He regarded ankylosaurs as herbivores.
- Lucas erected the genus Hoplitosaurus to house the species "Polacanthus" marshi.
- Franz Nopcsa described the new genus and species Onychosaurus hungaricus.

==== 1905 ====
- Samuel Williston described the new genus and species Stegopelta landerensis.

==== 1908 ====
- Brown described the new genus and species Ankylosaurus magniventris. He also named the Ankylosauridae and Ankylosaurinae. He followed Marsh's 1890 suggestion that ankylosaurs and stegosaurs were close relatives.

==== 1909 ====
- Wieland described the new genus and species Hierosaurus sternbergi.

=== 1910s ===
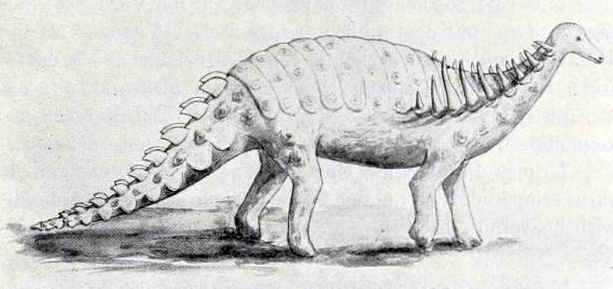
Early illustration of Struthiosaurus by Nopsca from 1915

==== 1914 ====
- While collecting fossils in Dinosaur Provincial Park, William Edmund Cutler discovered the type specimen of an ankylosaur taxon that would later be named Scolosaurus cutleri in his honor. However, while undercutting the specimen it collapsed on him "resulting in serious upper body injuries."

==== 1915 ====
- Nopcsa described the new species Struthiosaurus transylvanicus.

==== 1918 ====
- Nopcsa described the new genus and species Leipsanosaurus noricus.

==== 1919 ====
- Lambe described the new genus and species Panoplosaurus mirus.

=== 1920s ===
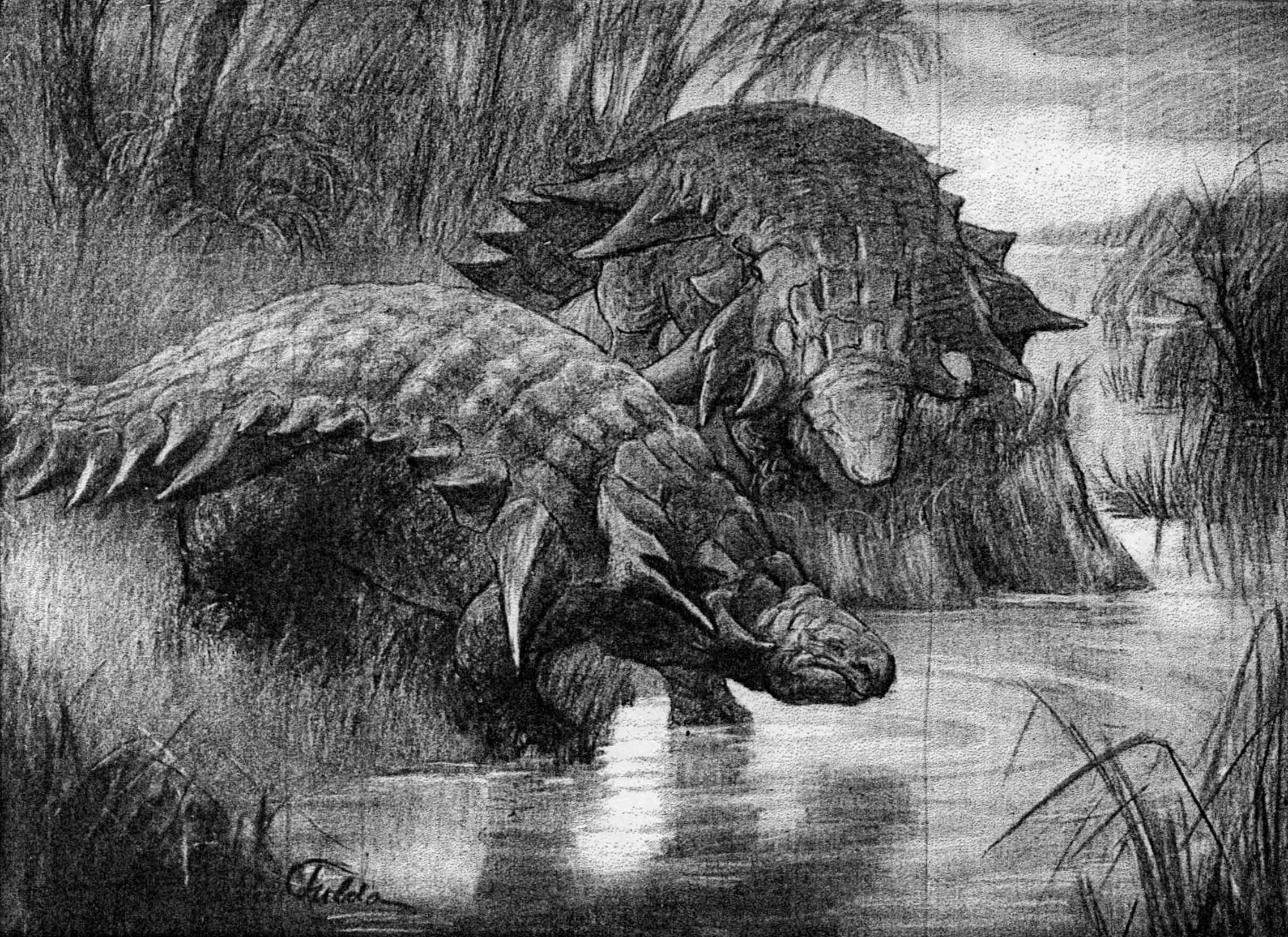
Life restoration of two Edmontonia from 1922, based on the 1915 AMNH specimen

==== 1923 ====
- Henry Fairfield Osborn named the Ankylosauria.
- Charles A. Matley described the new genus and species Lametasaurus indicus.

==== 1924 ====
- Parks described the new genus and species Dyoplosaurus acutosquameus.
- Hennig described the new species Polacanthus becklesi.

==== 1927 ====
- Alfred Sherwood Romer published the first formal diagnosis for the Ankylosauria. He observed that the anatomy of the stegosaur pelvis and hindlimb as well as their primarily Jurassic age distinguished them from the mainly Cretaceous ankylosaurs. As the Stegosauria originally included all armored dinosaurs, Romer's distinction marked the beginning of the modern use of the name to refer to the plate-backed and spike-tailed dinosaurs.

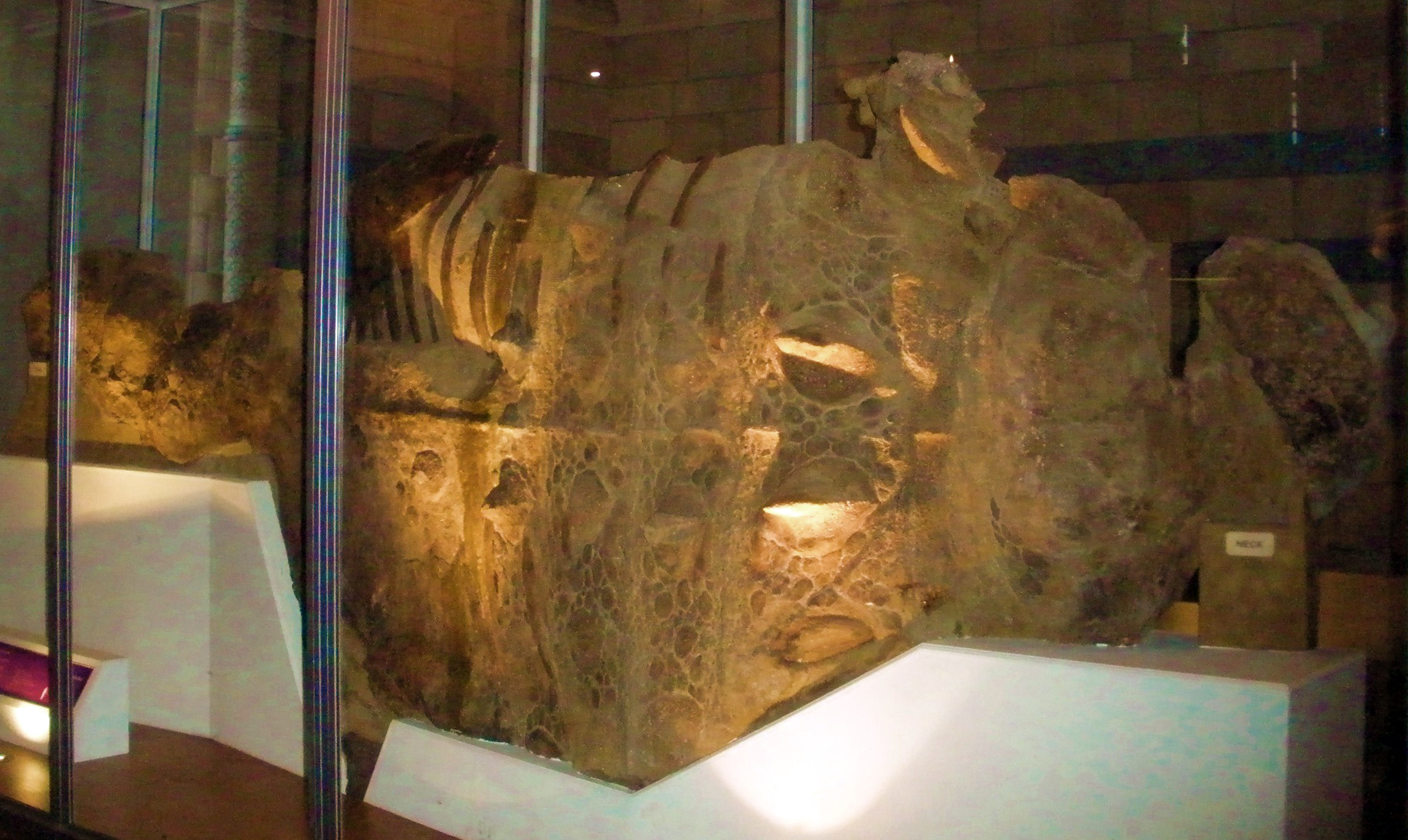
Type specimen of Scolosaurus

==== 1928 ====
- Nopcsa described the new genus Scolosaurus.
- Charles Sternberg described the new genus and species Edmontonia longiceps.

==== 1929 ====
- Nopcsa described the new species Scolosaurus cutleri.
- Nopcsa described the new genus and species Polacanthoides ponderosus, and the new species Rhodanosaurus lugdunensis.
- Sternberg described the new genus and species Anodontosaurus lambei.

=== 1930s ===
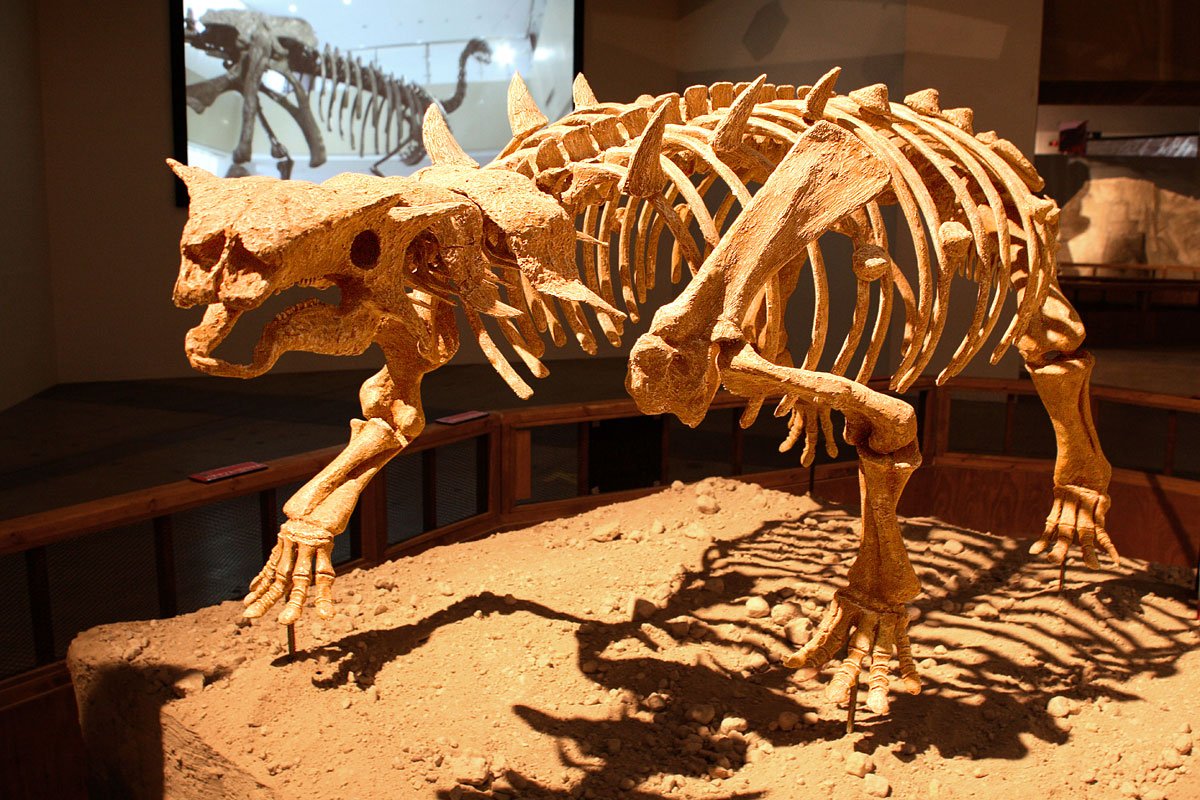
Skeletal reconstruction of Pinacosaurus

==== 1930 ====
- Charles Whitney Gilmore described the new genus and species Palaeoscincus rugosidens.

==== 1932 ====
- Sternberg described the new ichnogenus and species Tetrapodosaurus borealis from the Early Cretaceous Gething Formation of British Columbia, Canada. He attributed the tracks to ceratopsians, but they would later be attributed to ankylosaurs.

==== 1933 ====
- Gilmore described the new genus and species Pinacosaurus grangeri.

==== 1934 ====
- Chakravarti described the new genus and species Brachypodosaurus gravis.

==== 1935 ====
- C. C. Young described the new species Pinacosaurus ninghsiensis.

==== 1936 ====
- Mehl described the new species Nodosaurus coleii.

=== 1940s ===
==== 1940 ====
- Russell concluded that ankylosaurs chewed with a simple straight-up-and-down movement of the jaws and only fed on soft vegetation based on aspects of their skull and tooth anatomy.

=== 1950s ===
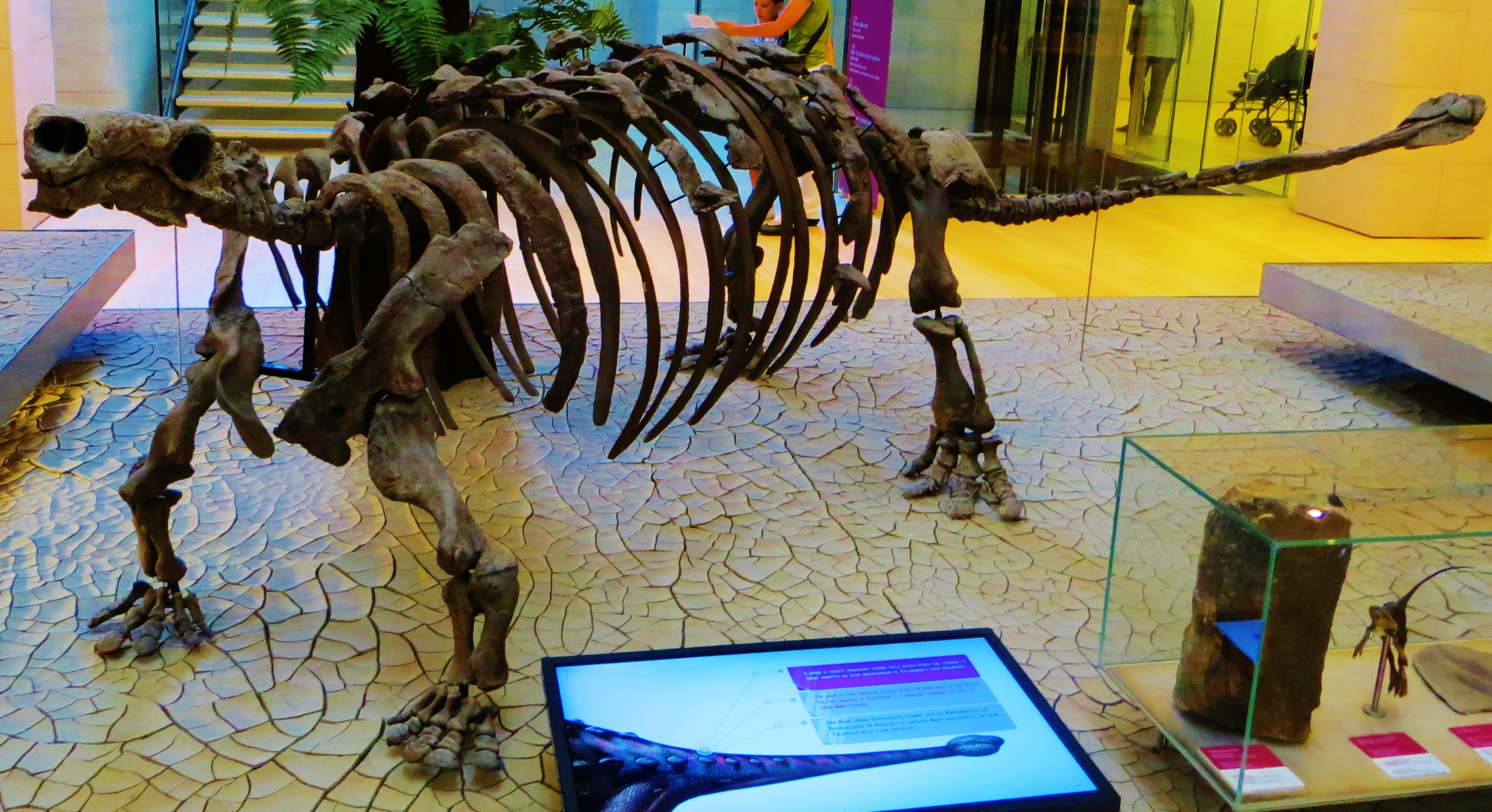
Skeletal reconstruction of Talarurus plicatospineus

==== 1952 ====
- Evgeny Maleev described the new genus and species Syrmosaurus viminicaudus, as well as the species S. disparoserratus.
- Maleev described the new genus and species Talarurus plicatospineus.

==== 1953 ====
- Birger Bohlin described the new genus and species Peishansaurus philemys. He also described the new genus and species Sauroplites scutiger, and the new genus and species Stegosaurides excavatus.

==== 1955 ====
- Nicholas Hotton regarded ankylosaurs as herbivores.

==== 1956 ====
- Maleev described the new species Dyoplosaurus giganteus.

=== 1960s ===
==== 1960 ====
- T. H. Eaton described the new genus and species Silvisaurus condrayi.

==== 1963 ====
- F. H. Khakimov discovered a new dinosaur track site in Shirkent National Park, Tajikistan.
- Zakharov and Khakimov reported the dinosaur track site discovered by the latter to the scientific literature.

==== 1964 ====
- Zakharov described the new ichnogenus and species Macropodosaurus gravis. He attributed it to a theropod, but these tracks are more likely to have been produced by ankylosaurs.

==== 1969 ====
- Haas interpreted the ankylosaur diet and consisting of soft plants that ankylosaurs chewed with a simple straight-up-and-down movement of the jaws based on their skull and tooth anatomy.

=== 1970s ===
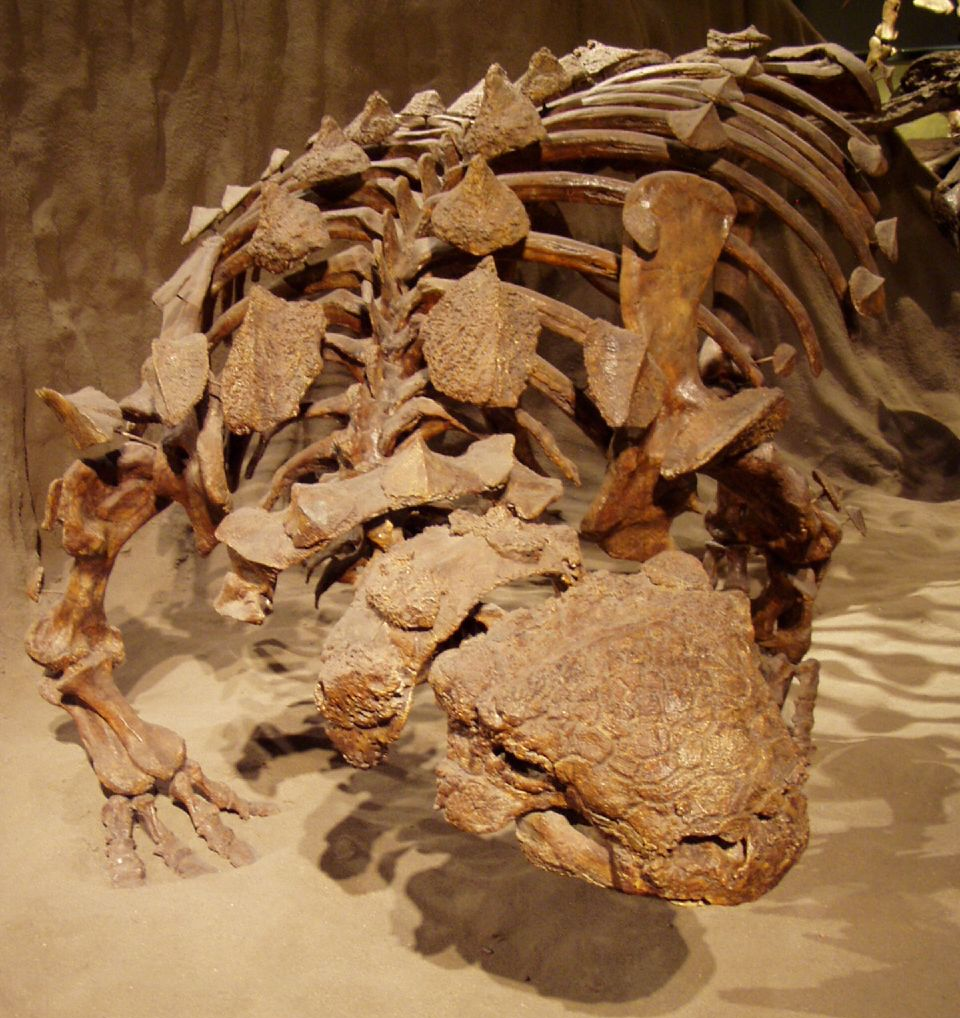
Skeletal mount of Scolosaurus thronus

==== 1970 ====
- John Ostrom described the new genus and species Sauropelta edwardsorum.

==== 1971 ====
- Walter Coombs published landmark research into ankylosaur taxonomy, bringing order to a once "chaotic and confused" field of study. He recognized two main groups of ankylosaurs, the Ankylosauridae and Nodosauridae. Coombs interpreted the ankylosaur diet as consisting of soft plants that ankylosaurs chewed with a simple straight-up-and-down movement of the jaws based on their skull and tooth anatomy.
- Haubold reported the presence of the ichnospecies Metatetrapous valdensis from the Buckeburg Formation of Germany. This ichnospecies is attributed to ankylosaurs.

==== 1972 ====
- Coombs observed that Euoplocephalus was so thoroughly armored that there was even a bony plate protecting its eyelids.

==== 1977 ====
- Teresa Maryanska described the new genus Tarchia for the species "Dyoplosaurus" giganteus. She also named the new species Tarchia kielanae and the new genus and species Saichania chulsanensis. She followed the scheme proposed by Coombs earlier that decade dividing the ankylosaurs into ankylosaurids and nodosaurids. She also made observations regarding ankylosaur limb posture, noting that while the hind limb was nearly straight up and down, the humerus was oriented at an angle downward and toward the rear of the animal. When studying the ankylosaur tail she noted that the centra of the vertebrae near its tip are fused, which would make it hard for the animal to raise the tail club very high.

==== 1978 ====
- Kurzanov and Tumanova described the new genus and species Amtosaurus magnus.
- Coombs published more work on ankylosaur taxonomy. He noted that ankylosaurs were probably completely unable to walk on their hind legs and published further remarks on ankylosaur limb posture. He argued that while some researchers interpreted some aspects of ankylosaur forelimb anatomy as adaptations for digging, their hoof-like toe nails made this interpretation unlikely.

==== 1979 ====
- Coombs interpreted the bony tendons near the tip of the ankylosaur tail as a means to convey the forces generated by the tail musculature closer to the animal's body all the way down to its club.

=== 1980s ===
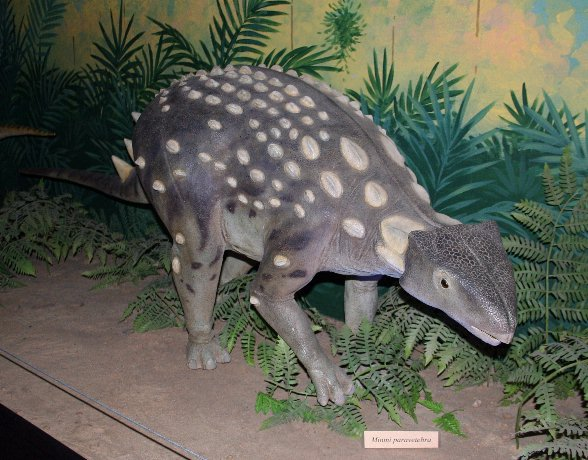
Model of Minmi paravertebra at the National Dinosaur Museum, Canberra

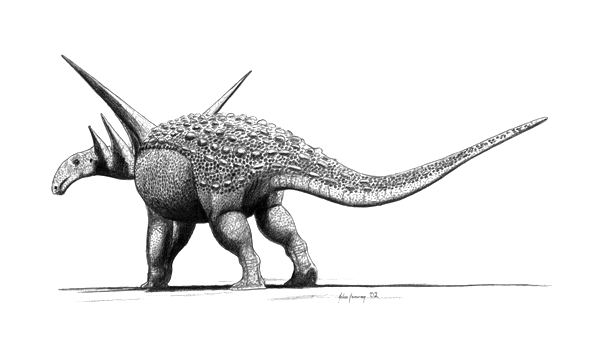
Life restoration of Sauropelta edwardsorum.

==== 1980 ====
- Ralph Molnar described the new genus and species Minmi paravertebra.
- Peter Galton described the new genus and species Dracopelta zbyszewskii.

==== 1982 ====
- Delair described the new genus Vectensia.

==== 1983 ====
- Tumanova described the new genus and species Shamosaurus scutatus.
- Campbell reported the presence of dinosaur footprints in the Toro Toro Formation of Bolivia which he attributed to sauropods.

==== 1984 ====
- Kenneth Carpenter attributed the ichnogenus Tetrapodosaurus reported by Sternberg from British Columbia in the 1930s to ankylosaurs rather than ceratopsians. He argued that the most likely trackmaker was Sauropelta.
- Leonardi described the dinosaur footprints reported by Campbell the previous year in detail and named them Ligabuichnium bolivianum. Rather than sauropods, Leonardi argued that these tracks were produced by ankylosaurs or ceratopsians although it was difficult ascertain which of these taxa were responsible due to the poor preservation of the tracks.

==== 1986 ====
- Galton interpreted the ankylosaur diet and consisting of soft plants that ankylosaurs chewed with a simple straight-up-and-down movement of the jaws based on their skull and tooth anatomy.

==== 1987 ====
- Paul Ensom described dinosaur footprints from the Purbeck Beds of England once thought to have been left by sauropods. They are now thought to have been left by ankylosaurs.
- Tumanova erected the new genus Maleevus to house the species Syrmosaurus disparoserratus. Tumanova followed the scheme proposed by Coombs earlier that decade dividing the ankylosaurs into ankylosaurids and nodosaurids.
- Gasparini and others reported ankylosaur remains from Antarctica.

==== 1988 ====
- Robert Bakker described the new genus and species Denversaurus schlessmani. He also erected the new genus Chassternbergia for the species "Edmontonia" rugosidens.

==== 1989 ====
- Currie reported the discovery of a Tetrapodosaurus track from British Columbia. Although he could not confidently identify its stratigraphic origin, the rock preserving the tracks has since been attributed to the Dunvegan Formation.
- A worker at the Smoky River Coal Mine near Grande Cache, Alberta alerted the Royal Tyrell Museum to the presence of dinosaur footprints in the area. This site would come to be recognized as the most important ankylosaur track site in the world.

=== 1990s ===
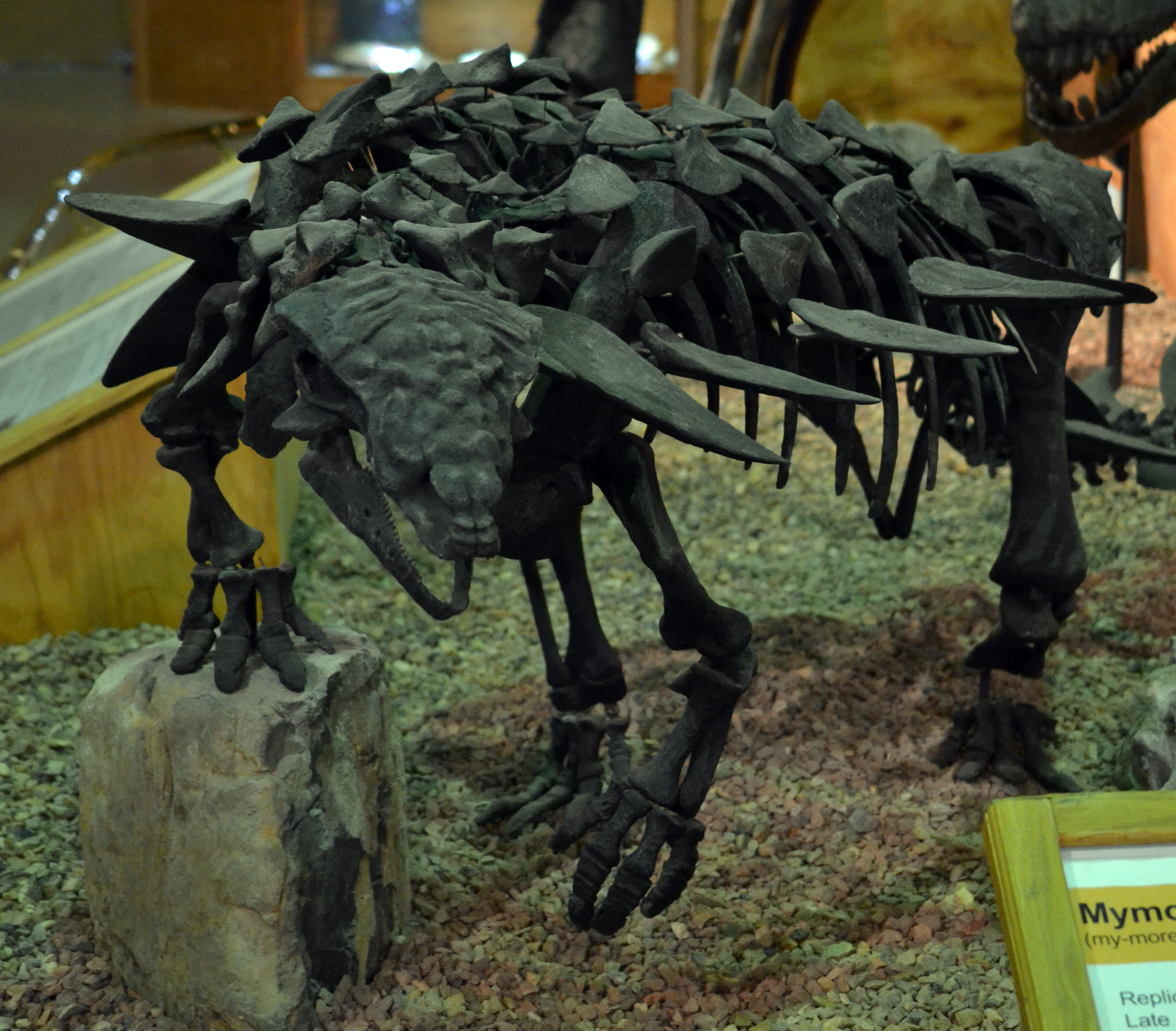
Skeletal reconstruction of Mymoorapelta at the Wyoming Dinosaur Center

==== 1990 ====
- Coombs and Maryanska remarked that the boney secondary palate of the ankylosaur skull would have strengthened it by acting as a brace.
- A well-preserved skeleton of Minmi was excavated from the Allaru Formation in Queensland, Australia by the Queensland Museum and catalogued as QM F18101. The skeleton was mostly articulated, including its armor. Since most ankylosaur specimens do not preserve the life arrangement of their armor, QM F18101 represented a rare find. The specimen also preserved the animal's gut contents, the first to be discovered in any armored dinosaur.

==== 1991 ====
- Lockley argued that the supposed sauropod tracks reported by Ensom from the Purbeck Beds of Dorset, England were actually made by ankylosaurs.
- Frank DeCourten discovered dinosaur tracks preserved in the Cedar Mountain Formation of Utah that were likely produced by ankylosaurs.

==== 1993 ====
- Tumanova described the new genus and species Tsagantegia longicranialis.
- Jerzykiewicz and others reported the presence of borings of unknown cause on the bones of some juvenile Pinacosaurus grangeri from Bayan Mandahu, Inner Mongolia, China.
- Z. Dong described the new genus and species Tianchisaurus nedegoaperferima.
- Thulborn proposed that the tail club of ankylosaurs may actually have functioned as a "false head" meant to distract predators. However, this hypothesis has not received much support from the paleontological community, and has been criticized as "dubiou[s]".
- Grady published an illustration of an ankylosaur trackway from the "Mine" site in the Smoky River Coal Mine at Grande Cache, Alberta.

==== 1994 ====
- Kirkland and Carpenter described the new genus and species Mymoorapelta maysi.
- Psihoyos and Knoebber described a dinosaur track site in the Smoky Hill Coal Mine of Grande Cache, Alberta and reported that the site had been destroyed in a rock slide.
- Whyte and Romano described the new ichnogenus and species Deltapodus brodericki for dinosaur footprints discovered in the Aalenian-Bajocian Saltwick Formation of Yorkshire, England. The authors attributed the tracks to sauropods, but they may actually have been made by ankylosaurs.
- Leonardi concluded that the Bolivian Ligabuichnium tracks were made by an ankylosaur after all.

==== 1995 ====
- Carpenter, Dilkes, and Weishampel erected the new genus Niobrarasaurus to house the species Hierosaurus coleii.
- Coombs studied the anatomy of the tail of Euoplocephalus and concluded that its club was held just slightly off the ground rather than dragging or held and a significant height. He reiterated observations previously made in 1977 by Maryanska that the fusion of the vertebral centra near the tip of the animal's tail would make it difficult to raise very high.
- Coombs described the new genus and species Texasetes pleurohalio.

==== 1996 ====
- Lee described the new genus and species Pawpawsaurus campbelli.
- Molnar reported the existence of a second species of Minmi but did not name it.

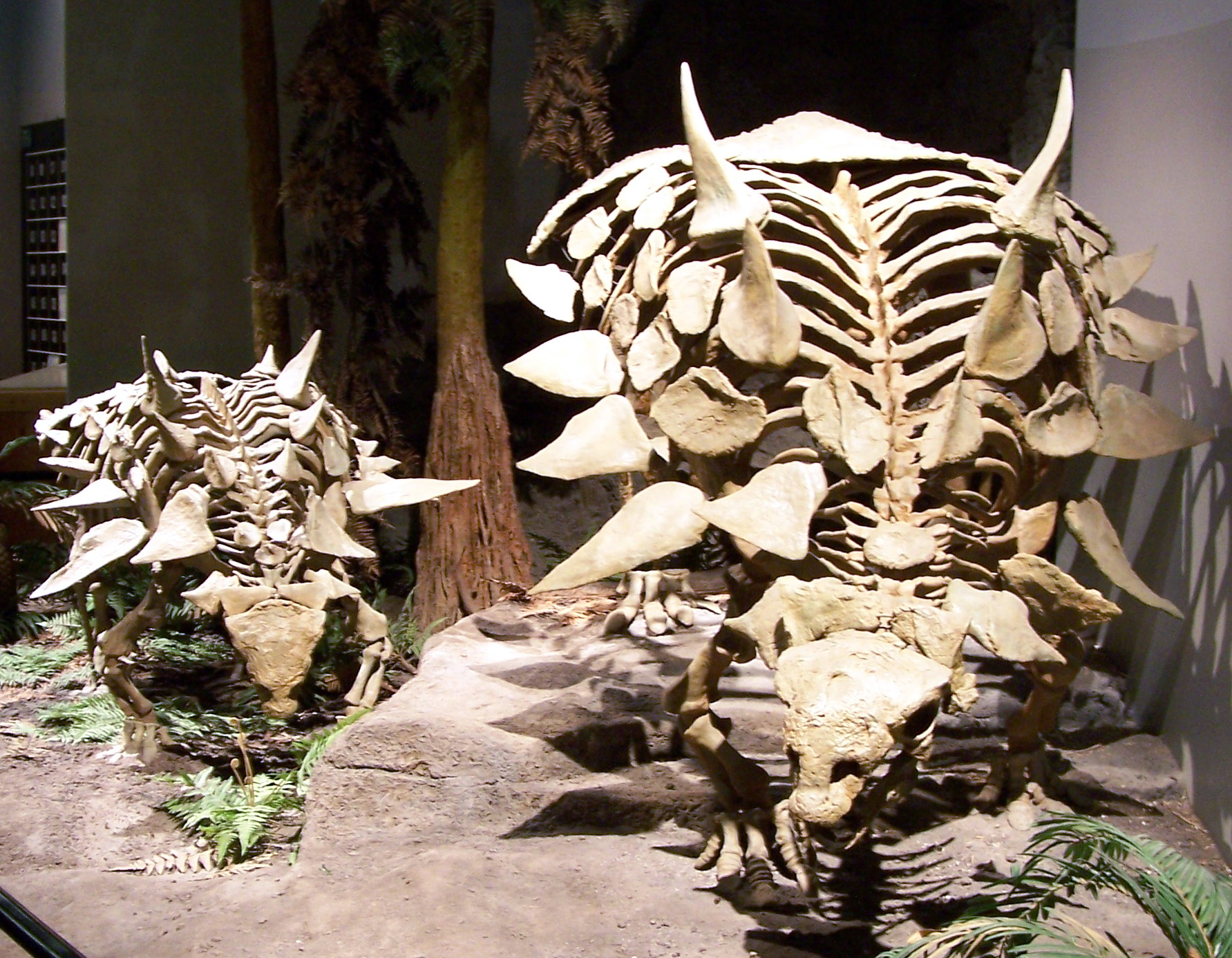
Skeletal reconstructions of Gastonia at the North American Museum of Ancient Life

- Blows described the new species Polacanthus rudgwickensis.

==== 1997 ====
- Witmer studied archosaur "craniofacial pneumaticity". He concluded that rather than performing a biological function, paranasal sinuses in archosaurs "are best explained as an optimization of skull architecture". This cast doubt on various researchers' interpretations of the sometimes complex nasal cavities and sinus systems possessed by ankylosaurs. Past workers had thought that these cavities and sinuses may have given ankylosaurs an improved sense of smell, housed glands, acted as a resonating chamber for loud vocalizations, or helped conserve body heat and moisture.

==== 1998 ====
- Carpenter, Miles, and Cloward described the new genus and species Gargoyleosaurus parkpinorum.
- Kirkland described the new genus and species Gastonia burgei.

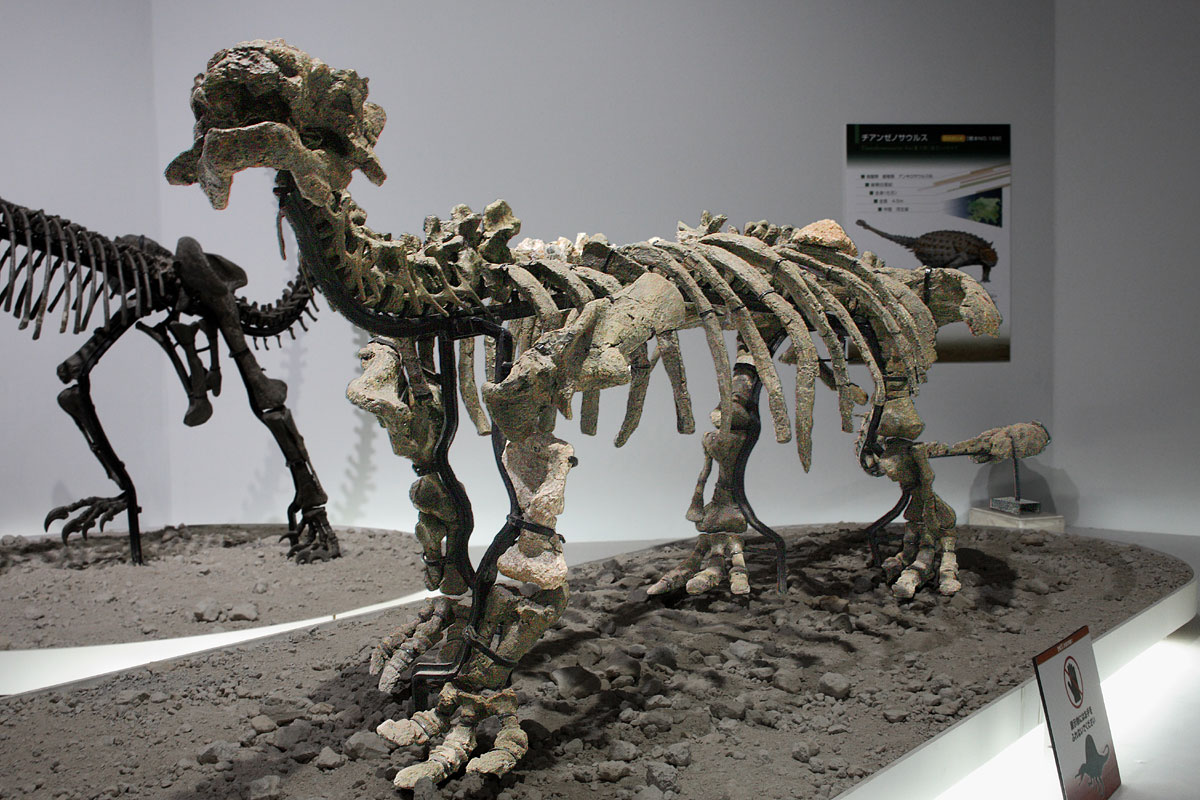
Skeletal reconstruction of Tianzhenosaurus

- Pang and Cheng described the new genus and species Tianzhenosaurus youngi.
- Barret and others described the new genus and species Shanxia tianzhensis.
- Sereno defined the ankylosaurs as all eurypods more closely related to Ankylosaurus than to Stegosaurus.
- McCrea and Currie described the dinosaur tracks discovered in the Smoky River Coal Mine at Grand Cache, Alberta. They noted that this was the most important ankylosaur track site ever discovered.
- McCrea and others reported the first known ankylosaur skin impression to be preserved in a footprint tracks preserved in the Dunvegan Formation near Pouce Coupe, Alberta.

==== 1999 ====
- Godefroit and others described the new species Pinacosaurus mephistocephalus.
- Sullivan described the new genus and species Nodocephalosaurus kirtlandensis.
- Carpenter and others described the new genus and species Animantarx ramaljonesi.
- Lockley and others described the 1991 possible ankylosaur footprint discovery in Utah.
- Ishigaki reported possible ankylosaur footprints from the Djadokhta Formation of Mongolia.

== 21st century ==
=== 2000s ===
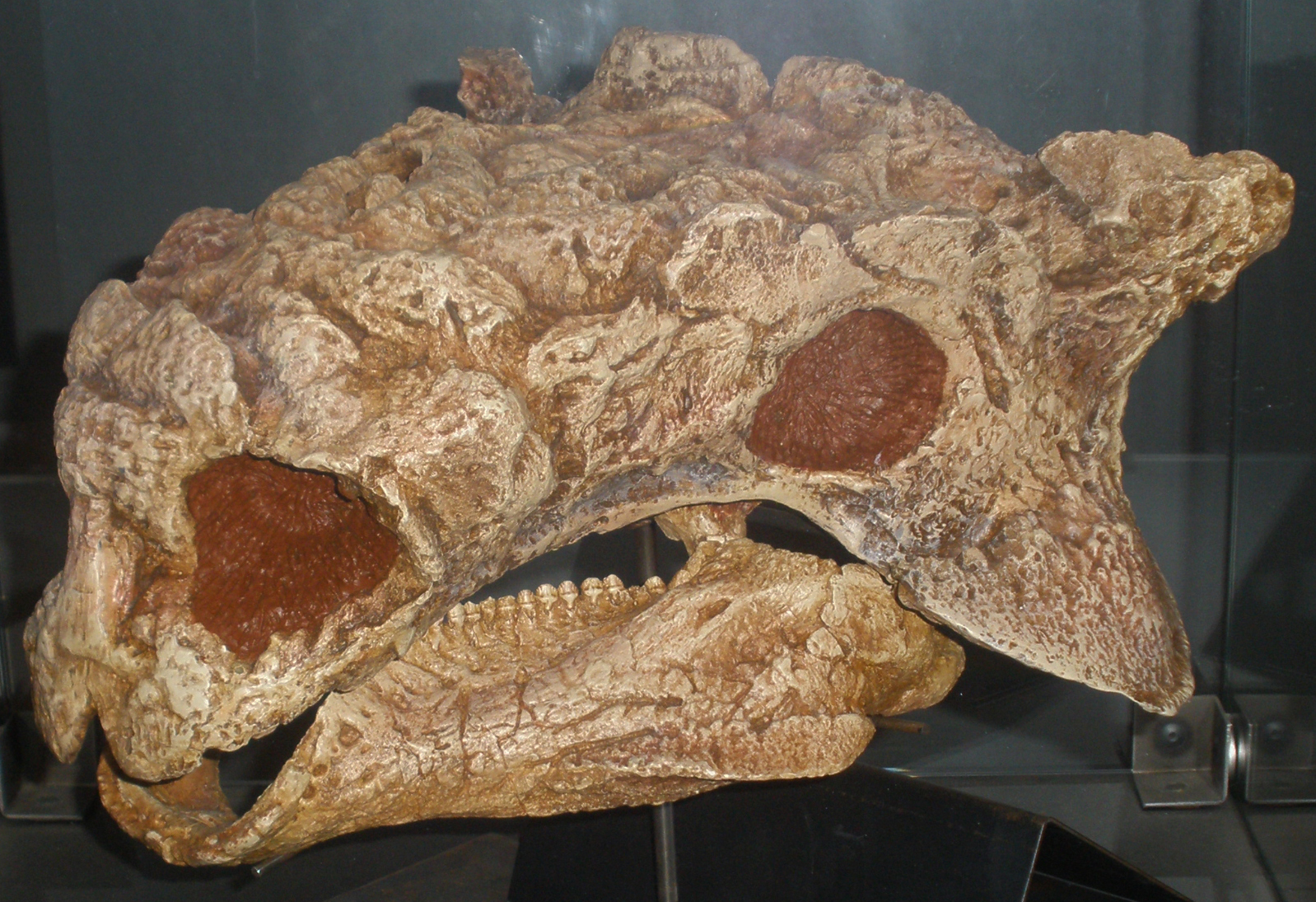
Skull of Tarchia kielanae

==== 2000 ====
- Ford described the new species Edmontonia australis and the new genus and species Glyptodontopelta mimus.
- Molnar and Clifford reported fossilized gut contents in a specimen of Minmi, which consisted of plant matter.

==== 2001 ====
- Rybczynsky and Vickaryous studied the jaws and teeth of Euoplocephalus. Contrary to decades of support for ankylosaurs chewing with a simple straight-up-and-down movement, they noticed visible wear facets and microscopic grooves that could only be explained by relatively complex jaw movements.
- Barrett reported wear facets on the teeth of Tarchia.
- Molnar and Clifford described the gut contents preserved in a specimen of the Australian ankylosaur Minmi. This specimen is catalogued by the Queensland Museum as QM F18101 and was excavated by the museum from near the Flinders River in 1990. The stomach contents consisted of plant vascular tissue, fruiting bodies, seeds, and possible fern spores. Molnar and Clifford described it as the most reliable evidence for the diet of an herbivorous dinosaur ever discovered.
- McCrea, Lockley, and Meyer observed that by this point in the history of ankylosaur research, ankylosaurs track fossils had been reported from North America, South America, Asia, and Europe. Most of these trackways were preserved in moist floodplain habitats where plant life was abundant. They attributed the Metatetrapous valdensis tracks from the Buckeburg Formation of Germany reported by Haubold in 1971 to ankylosaurs. They similarly argued that Macropodosaurus gravis of Tajikistan was produced by an ankylosaur rather than a theropod. The authors reported a single possible ankylosaur footprint from the Dakota Group of Baca County, Colorado. They also proposed that several footprint specimens collected from the Blackhawk Formation of Utah may have been ankylosaurian.
- Vickaryous and others described the new genus and species Gobisaurus domoculus.
- Carpenter and others described the new genus and species Cedarpelta bilbeyhallorum.
- Xu, Wang, and You described the new genus and species Liaoningosaurus paradoxus.

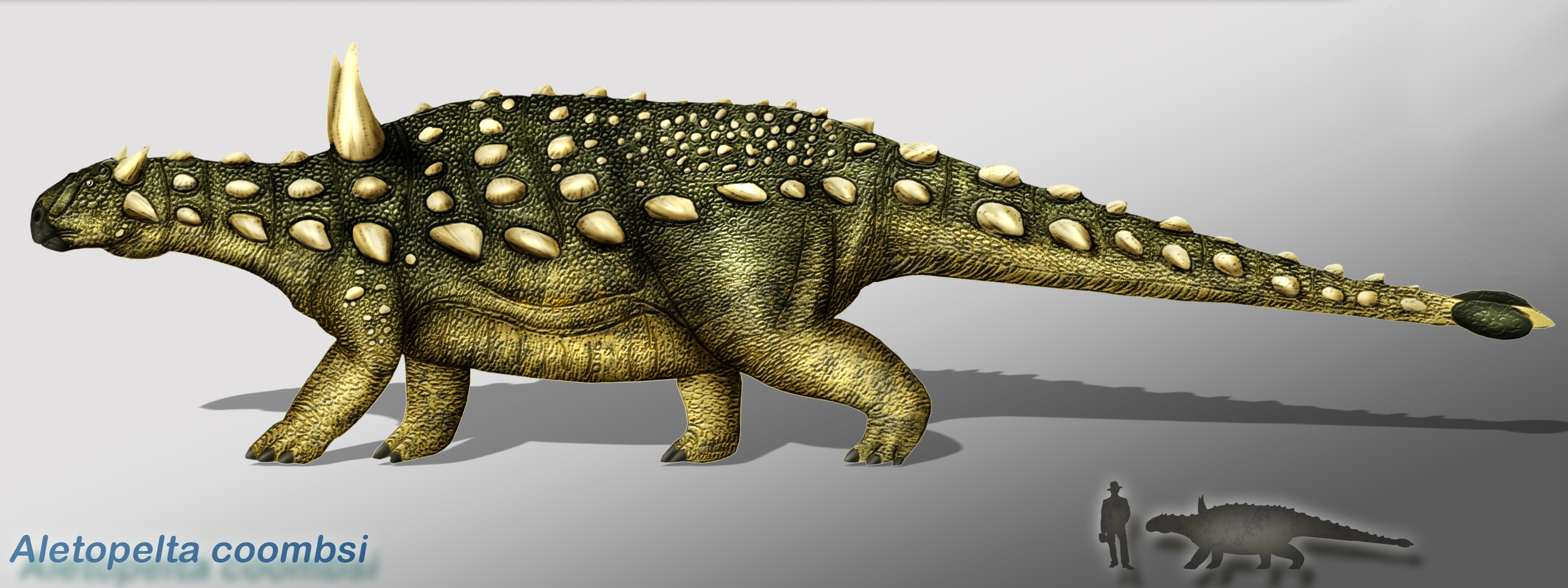
Artistic restoration of Aletopelta coombsi

- Ford and Kirkland described the new genus and species Aletopelta coombsi.

==== 2002 ====
- Dong described the new genus and species Crichtonsaurus bohlini.
- Averianov described the new genus and species Amtosaurus archibaldi.

==== 2003 ====
- Garcia and Pereda-Superbiola described the new species Struthiosaurus languedocensis.
- Vickaryous and Russell described the common ways ankylosaur skulls were distorted after death that could potentially confound anatomical interpretation. They noted a relationship between this tendency to suffer distortion and their unusual cranial traits like the fusion of the skull bones and their "embossing" cranial ornamentation.
- Ford redescribed and did an in deep analysis of the amor of Ankylosaurus

==== 2004 ====
- Averianov, 2002, vide Parish & Barrett, 2004 described the new genus and species Bissektipelta archibaldi.

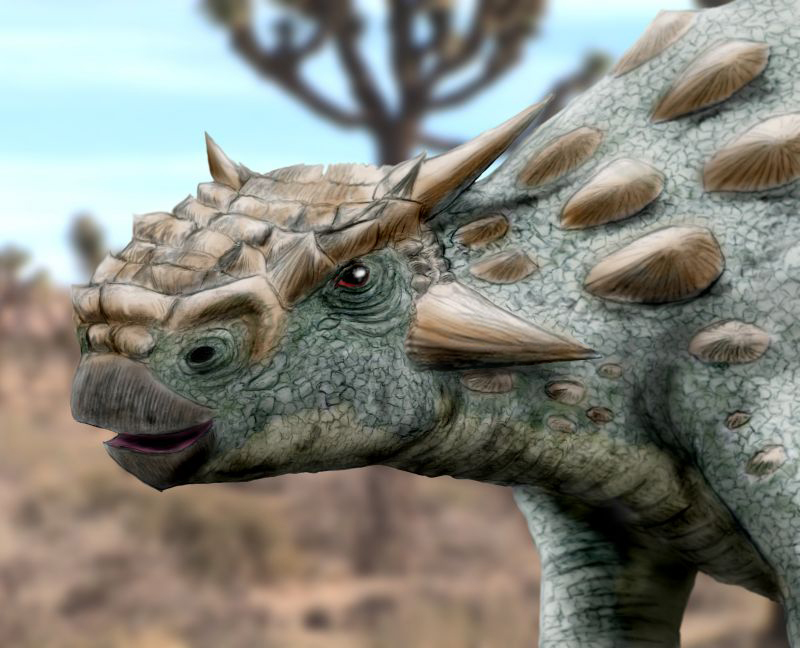
Artistic restoration of Minotaurasaurus ramachandrani

==== 2005 ====
- Ősi described the new genus and species Hungarosaurus tormai.

==== 2006 ====
- Salgado and Gasparini described the new genus and species Antarctopelta oliveroi.

==== 2007 ====
- Lü Junchang; Jin Xingsheng; Sheng Yiming; Li Yihong described the new genus and species Zhejiangosaurus lishuiensis.
- Xu and others described the new genus and species Zhongyuansaurus luoyangensis.

==== 2008 ====
- Carpenter and others described the new genus and species Peloroplites cedrimontanus
- Burns synonymizes Edmontonia australis with Glyptodontopelta mimus and confirms the validity of the latter

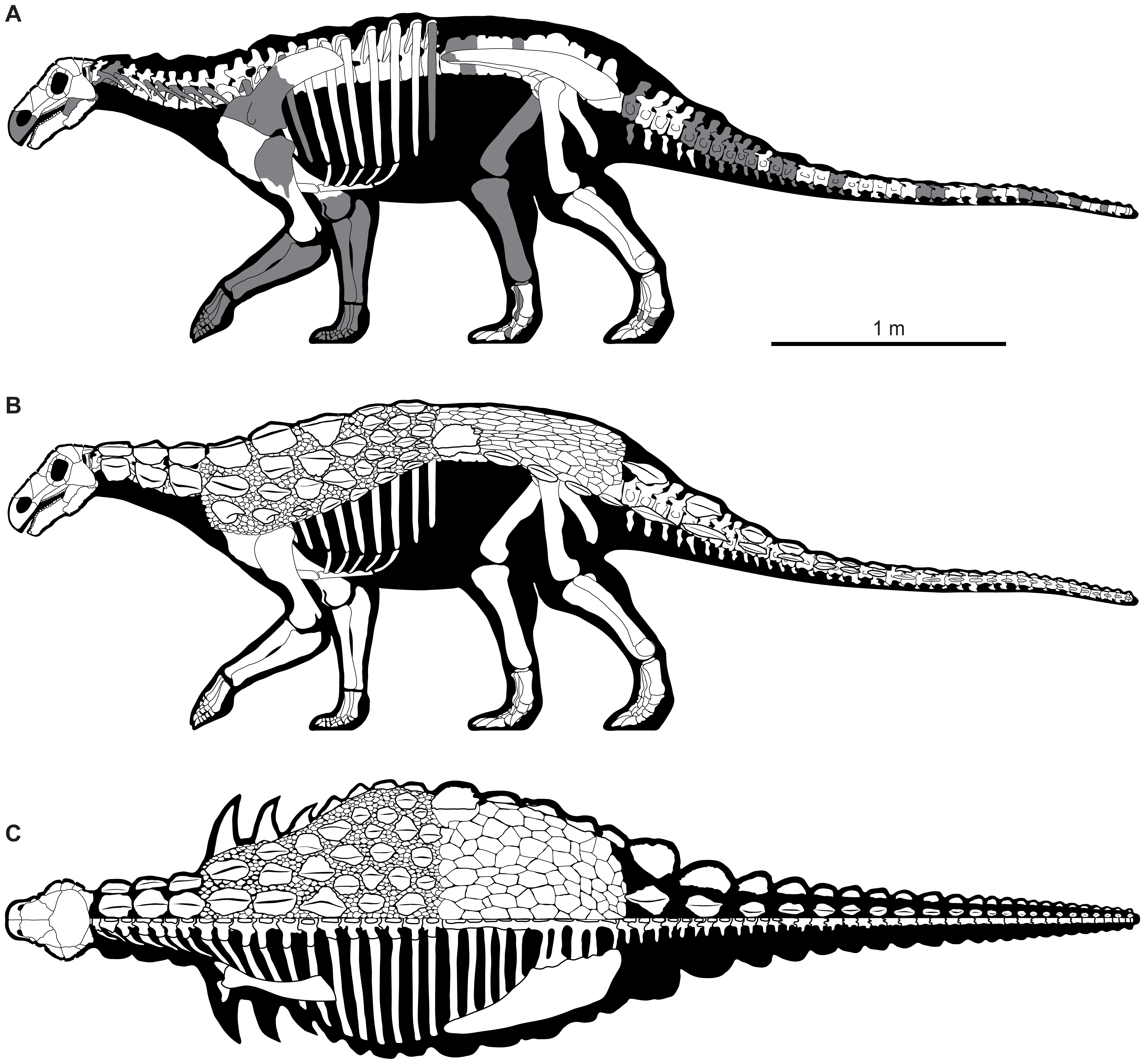
Skeletal reconstruction of Europelta carbonensis

==== 2009 ====
- Miles and Miles described the new genus and species Minotaurasaurus ramachandrani.
- Parsons and Parsons described the new genus and species Tatankacephalus cooneyorum.
- Arbour and others resurrect the genus and species Dyoplosaurus acutosquameus Parks, 1924

=== 2010s ===
==== 2011 ====
- Burns and Sullivan described the new genus and species Ahshislepelta minor.
- Burns and others describe new juvenile specimens of Pinacosaurus grangeri
- Stanford, Weishampel, and DeLeon described the new genus and species Propanoplosaurus marylandicus.

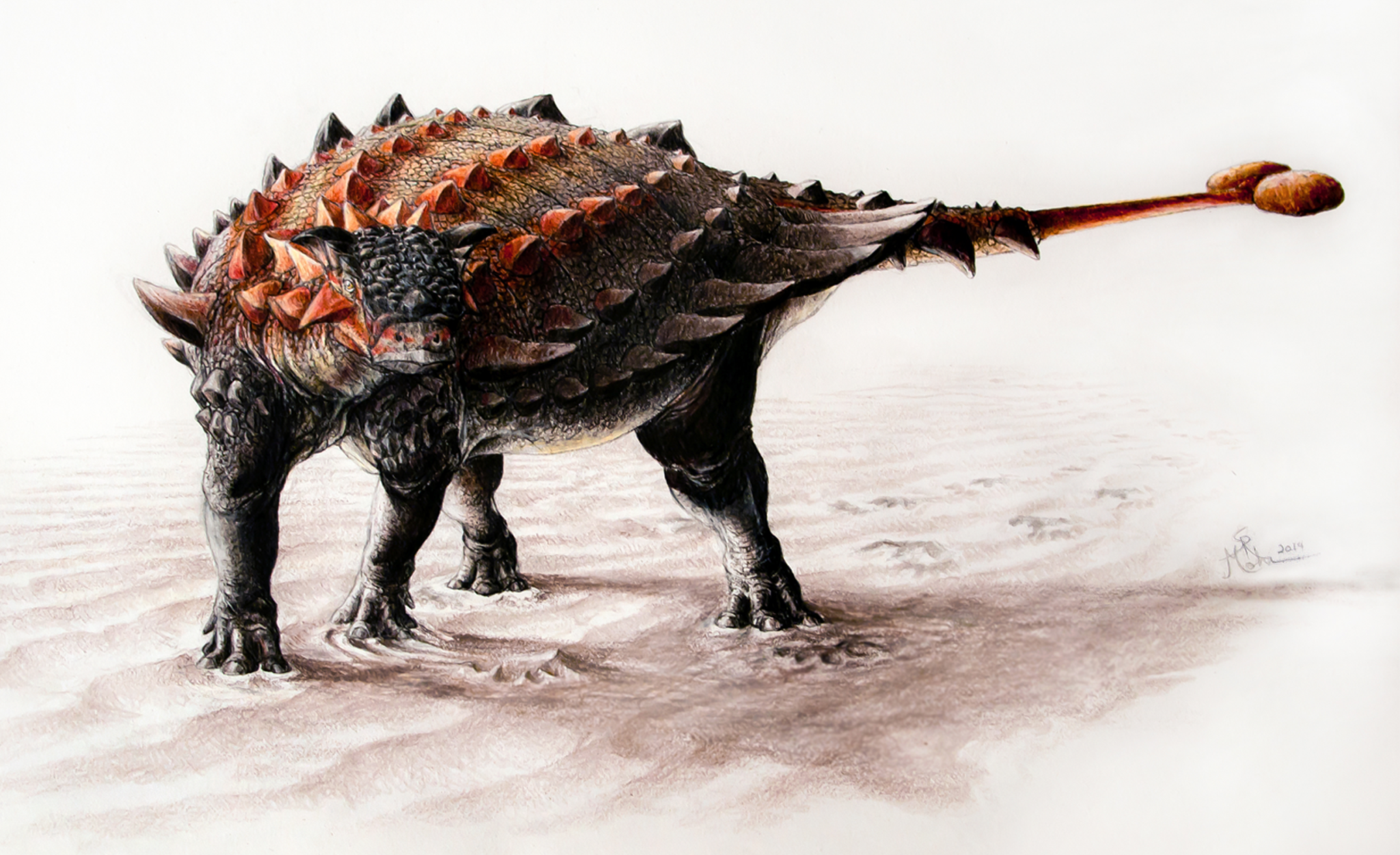
Artistic restoration of Ziapelta sanjuanensis

==== 2013 ====
- Chen and others described the new genus and species Dongyangopelta yangyanensis.
- Kirkland and others described the new genus and species Europelta carbonensis.
- Penkalski described the new genus and species Oohkotokia horneri.
- Yang and others described the new genus and species Taohelong jinchengensis.

==== 2014 ====
- Han and others described the new genus and species Chuanqilong chaoyangensis.
- Arbour and Currie described the new genus Crichtonpelta.
- Victoria M. Arbour, Philip J. Currie, and Demchig Badamgarav described the new genus and species Zaraapelta nomadis.
- Arbour and others described the new genus and species Ziapelta sanjuanensis.

==== 2015 ====
- Blows described the new genus Horshamosaurus.
- Leahey and others described the new genus and species Kunbarrasaurus ieversi.
- Burns and others describe juvenile material from Pinacosaurus grangeri collected during the Soviet-Mongolian Paleontological Expedition in 1969–1970

==== 2017 ====
- Arbour and Evans describe a new ankylosaur, Zuul crurivastator
- Brown and others described the new genus and species Borealopelta markmitchelli.
- Penkalski and Tumanova described the new species Tarchia teresae.

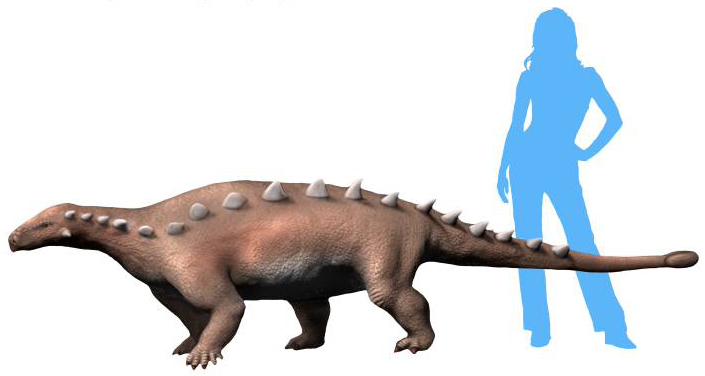
Life restoration of Jinyunpelta sinensis

==== 2018 ====
- Penkalski described the new species Scolosaurus thronus and Anodontosaurus inceptus and the new genus Platypelta.
- Zheng and others name the new genus and species Jinyunpelta sinensis.
- Rivera-Sylva and others described the new genus and species Acantholipan gonzalezi.
- Wiersma and Irmis described the new genus and species Akainacephalus johnsoni.
- McDonald and Wolfe described the new genus and species Invictarx zephyri.

==== 2019 ====
- Plates of an armored dinosaur from the Lower Jurassic (Sinemurian-Pliensbachian) Lower Kota Formation (India) are redescribed by Galton (2019), who considers these fossils to be more similar to plates of ankylosaurians than basal thyreophorans, and interprets them as the earliest ankylosaurian fossils reported so far.
- Description of an assemblage of 12 partial, articulated or associated ankylosaurian skeletons and thousands of isolated bones and teeth from the Cretaceous (Santonian) Iharkút vertebrate locality (Hungary) was published by Ősi et al. (2019).
- A study on the evolution of morphological traits associated with tail weaponry in ankylosaurs and glyptodonts, aiming to quantitatively test the hypothesis that tail weaponry of these groups is an example of convergent evolution, is published by Arbour & Zanno (2019).
- A study on the taphonomy and histology of the ornithischian (ankylosaurian and ornithopod) fossils from the La Cantalera-1 site (Lower Cretaceous Blesa Formation, Spain) is published by Perales-Gogenola et al. (2019).

=== 2020s ===
==== 2020 ====
- An isolated caudal vertebra representing the first evidence of the presence of an ankylosaur in the Upper Jurassic Qigu Formation (China) is described by Augustin et al. (2020).
- A study aiming to determine the social lifestyle of ankylosaurs, as indicated by anatomy, taphonomic history, ontogenetic composition of the mass death assemblages and inferred habitat characteristics, is published by Botfalvai, Prondvai & Ősi (2020).
- Redescription of the anatomy of the holotype specimens of Hylaeosaurus armatus and Polacanthus foxii, and a study on the taxonomy of all ankylosaur specimens from the British Wealden Supergroup, is published by Raven et al. (2020).
- Fossil stomach contents preserved within the abdominal cavity of the holotype specimen of Borealopelta markmitchelli are described by Brown et al. (2020).
- Description of the anatomy of braincases of three specimens of Bissektipelta archibaldi is published by Kuzmin et al. (2020).
- Wang et al. (2020) describe the new genus and species of ankylosaur, Sinankylosaurus.

== See also ==
- History of paleontology
  - Timeline of paleontology
    - Timeline of stegosaur research
