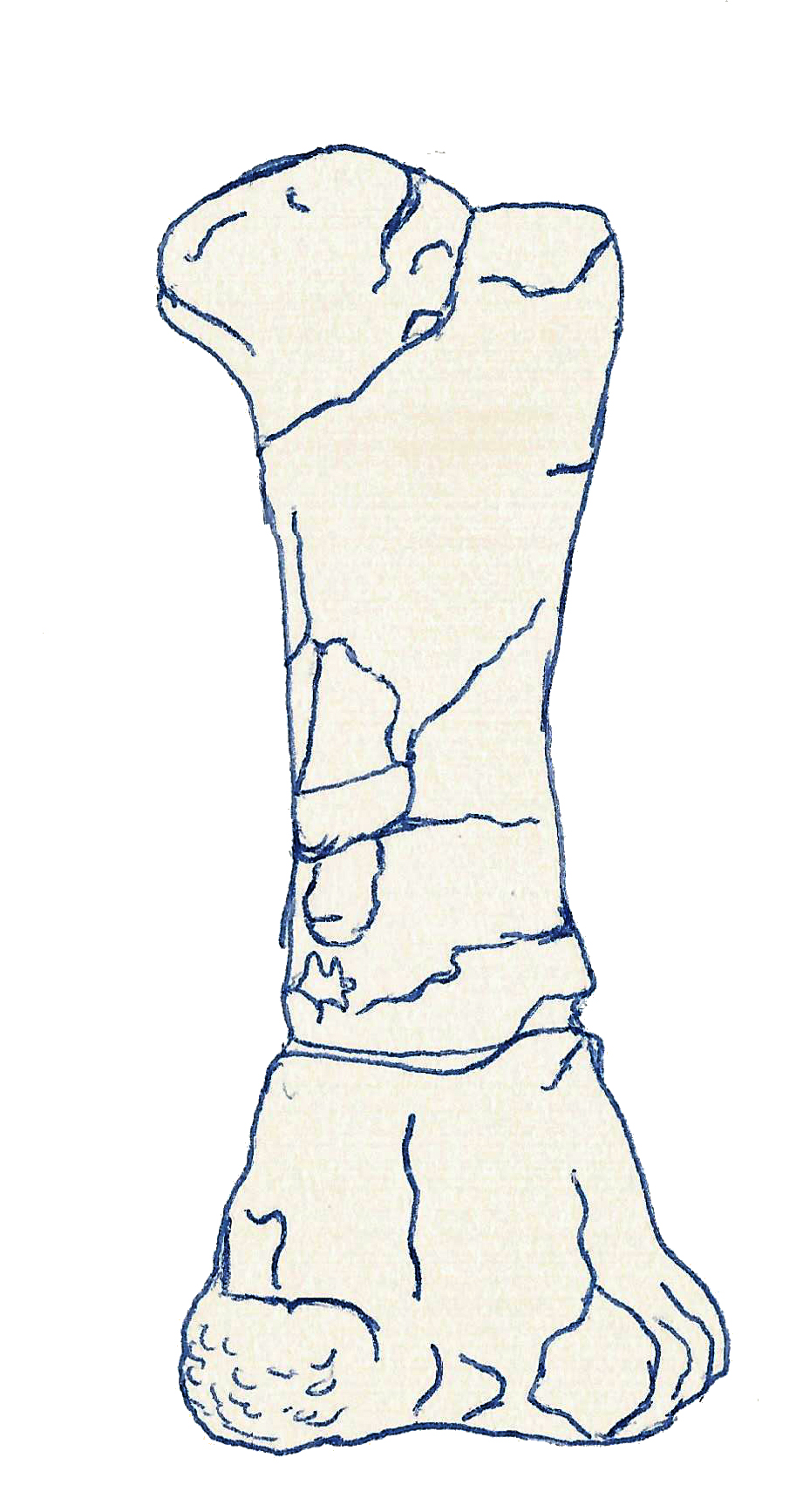
- Femur

Scientific classification
- Domain: Eukaryota
- Kingdom: Animalia
- Phylum: Chordata
- Clade: Dinosauria
- Clade: †Ornithischia
- Clade: †Thyreophora
- Clade: †Ankylosauria
- Genus: †Cryptosaurus; Seeley, 1869
- Species: †C. eumerus

Binomial name
- †Cryptosaurus eumerus Seeley, 1875

Synonyms
- Cryptodraco eumerus (Seeley, 1875) Lydekker, 1889

= Cryptosaurus =

Cryptosaurus Temporal range: Oxfordian 163–158 Ma

Extinct genus of dinosaurs

Cryptosaurus (meaning "hidden lizard") is a dubious genus of dinosaur known from a partial femur from the Late Jurassic of England. The sole species is Cryptosaurus eumerus.

The femur was found by the geologist Lucas Ewbank and donated by him to the Woodwardian Museum at Cambridge in 1869. Cryptosaurus was the same year named by British paleontologist Harry Seeley; the type species is Cryptosaurus eumerus. The genus name is derived from Greek kryptos, "hidden", a reference to the rarity of the find. The specific name means "well-formed thigh" in Greek, a reference to the stout build of the bone. The description of 1869, part of a catalogue of the Cambridge University collection, was rather minimal, consisting of the single sentence "On Shelf g is temporarily placed the femur of a Dinosaur from the Oxford Clay, Cryptosaurus eumerus". From this it is sometimes concluded that the name remained a nomen nudum until a full description by Seeley in 1875.

The holotype, CAMSM J.46882, was discovered in the Great Gransden brick pit, in strata of the Ampthill Clay Formation, dating from the upper Oxfordian. The right femur is about 33 centimetres long and has a thick shaft. It belonged to an adult or at least subadult individual, meaning that the species was rather small.

Seeley thought that Cryptosaurus was a relative of Iguanodon, the first such discovered from the Oxford Clay — hence the generic name. Friedrich von Huene classified it in the Camptosauridae in 1909. The work of Peter Galton however, showed that Cryptosaurus is an ankylosaurian of unknown affinities. Today it is commonly considered to be a nomen dubium because of the limited remains.

Cryptosaurus was for a long time known as Cryptodraco, which is an unnecessary replacement name. In 1889, Richard Lydekker renamed Cryptosaurus as he believed the name Cryptosaurus was already previously in use for another animal (Cystosaurus informally described by Geoffroy Saint-Hilaire in 1831). This was in error, a mistake originally caused by a wrong spelling of Cystosaurus in the French Bibliothèque universelle des sciences, belles-lettres, et arts, and the name Cryptosaurus has precedence.

== See also ==
- Timeline of ankylosaur research
