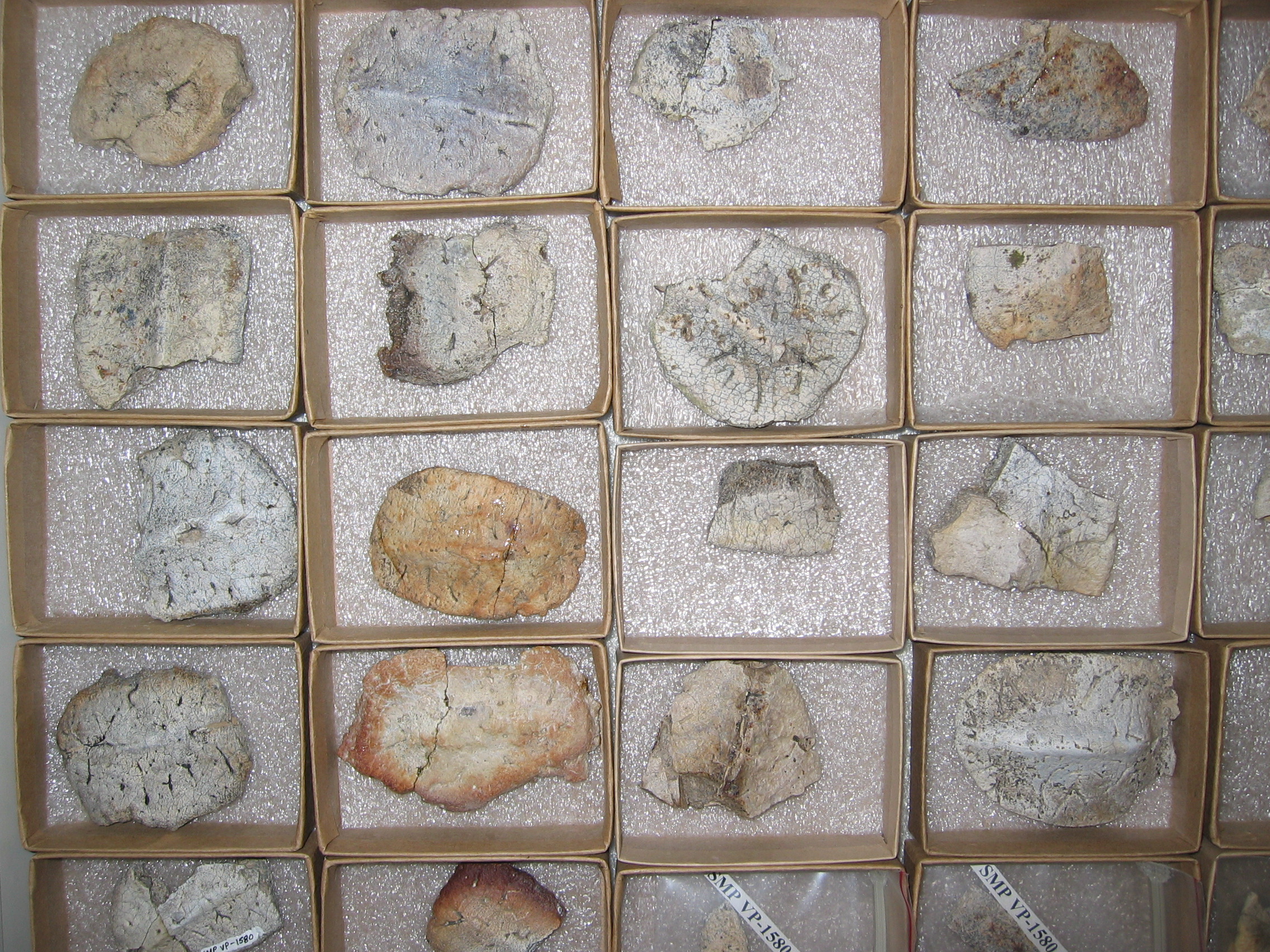
- Osteoderms from SMP VP1580

Scientific classification
- Kingdom: Animalia
- Phylum: Chordata
- Class: Reptilia
- Clade: Dinosauria
- Clade: †Ornithischia
- Clade: †Thyreophora
- Clade: †Ankylosauria
- Clade: †Euankylosauria
- Family: †Nodosauridae
- Genus: †Glyptodontopelta; Ford, 2000

Type species
- †Glyptodontopelta mimus Ford, 2000

Synonyms
- Edmontonia australis Ford, 2000

= Glyptodontopelta =

Glyptodontopelta Temporal range: Late Cretaceous, 67–66 Ma

Extinct genus of dinosaurs

Glyptodontopelta (meaning "Glyptodon shield") is a monospecific genus of nodosaurid dinosaur from New Mexico that lived during the Late Cretaceous (upper Maastrichtian, 67 to 66 Ma) in what is now the Naashoibito member of the Ojo Alamo Formation. The type and only species, Glyptodontopelta mimus, is known from numerous specimens that consist of osteoderms, a dentary, supraorbital and bone fragments. It was named in 2000 by Tracy Ford. Edmontonia australis is a junior synonym of Glyptodontopelta.

== Discovery and naming ==
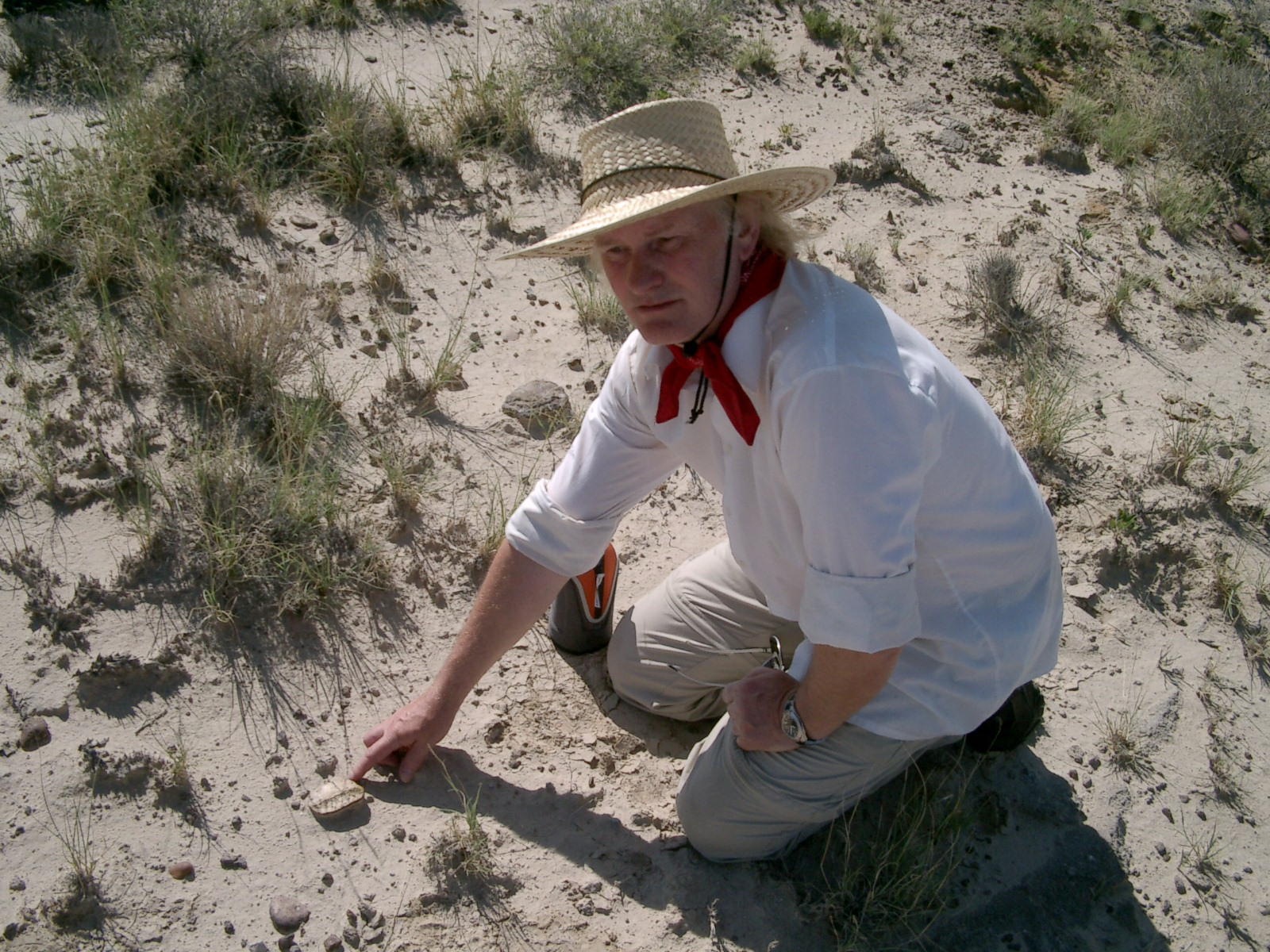
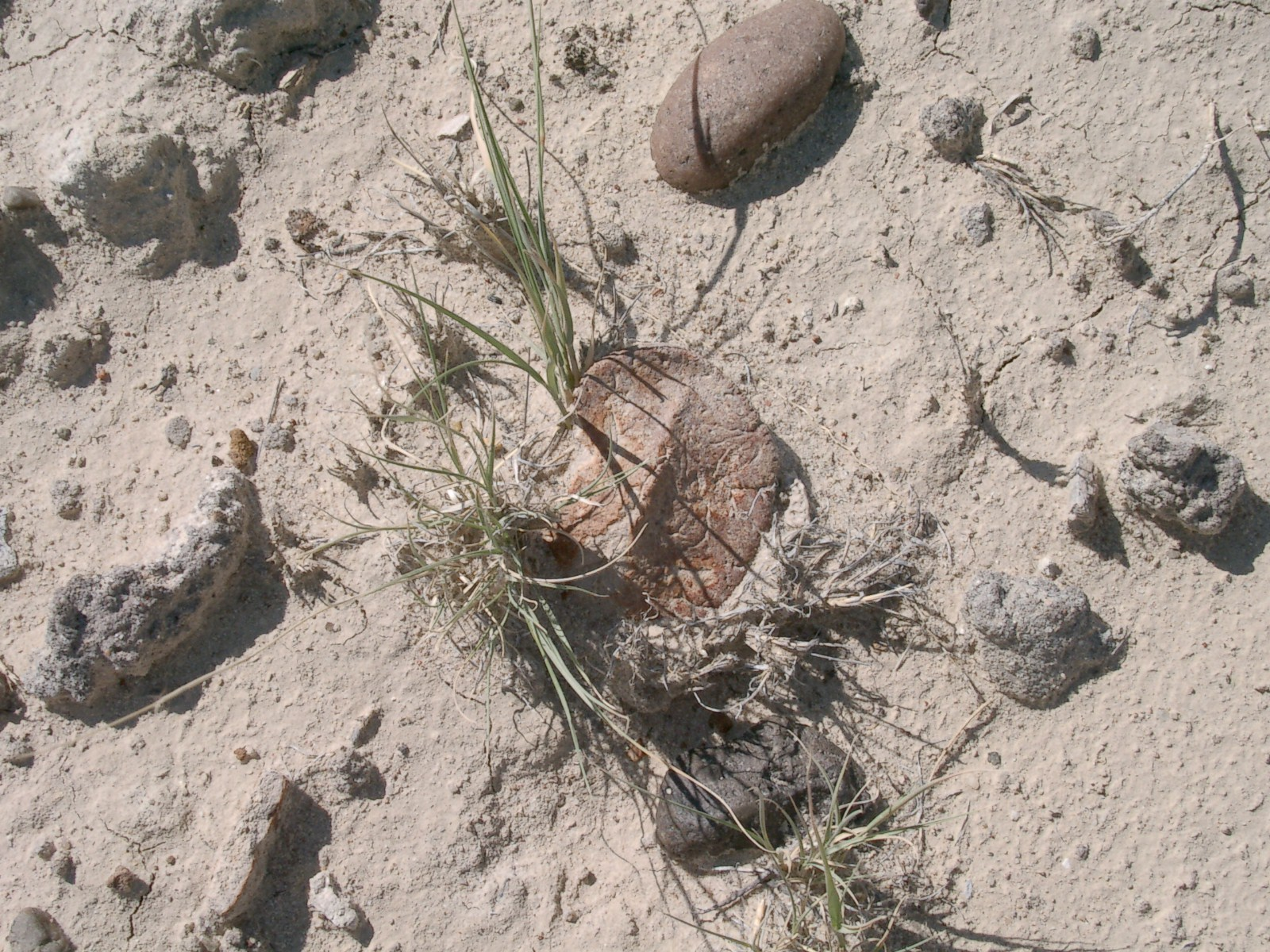
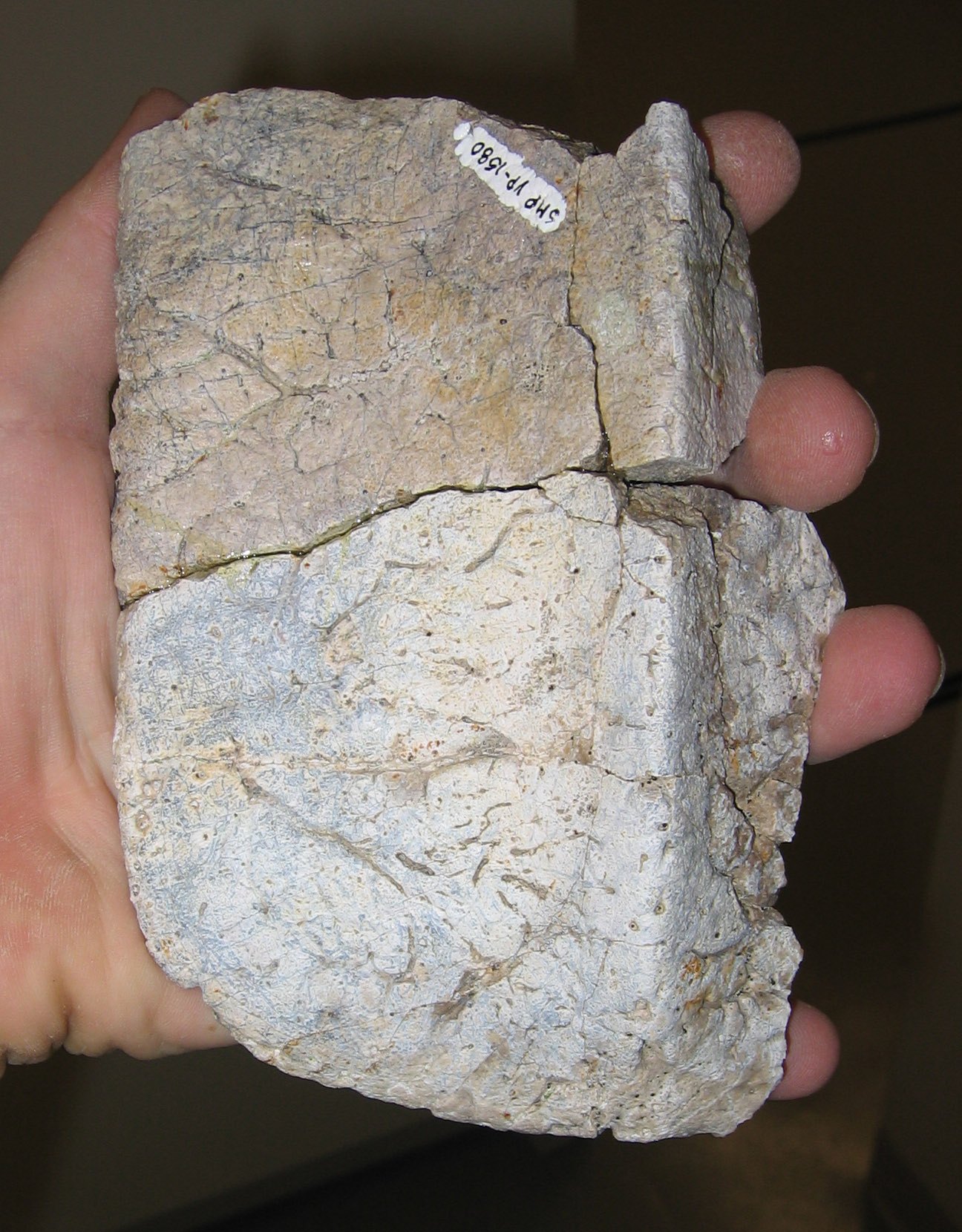
Discoverer Warwick Fowler (left) points at a Glyptodontopelta osteoderm at "Warwick's Ankylosaur Hill", locality of the most complete known specimen SMP VP-1580 in 2003, osteoderm from the most same specimen in situ (middle), and neck osteoderm (right)

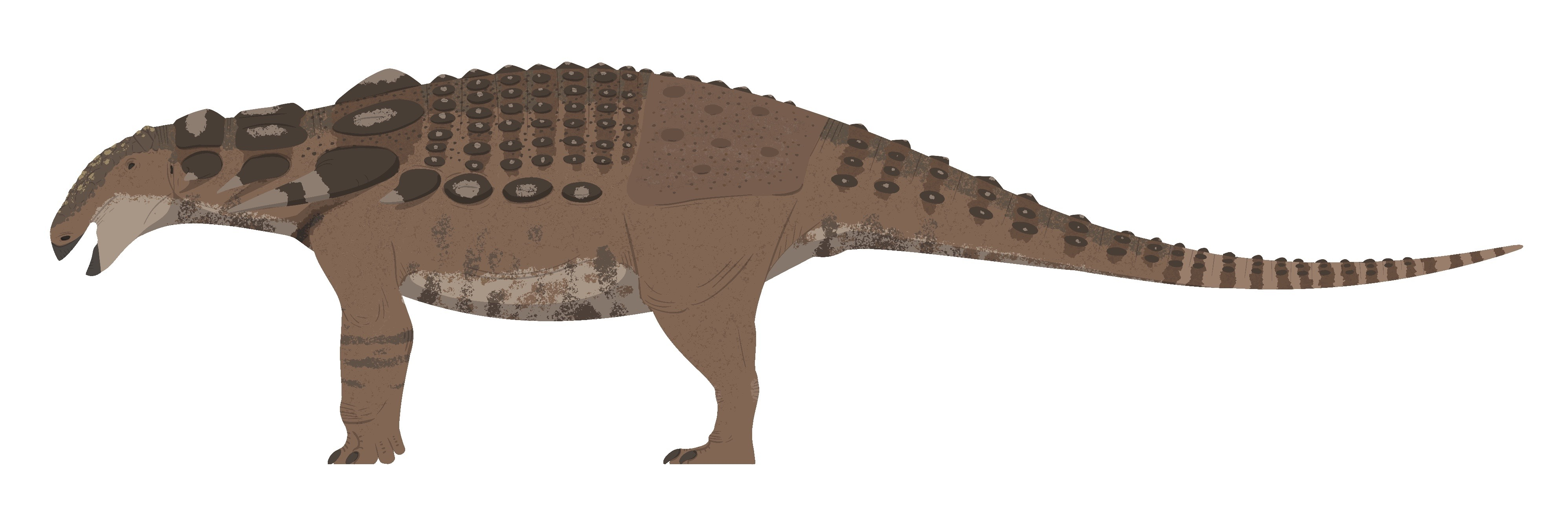
Life restoration

Fossils of Glyptodontopelta, consisting only of bony armor, were found in the U.S. state of New Mexico. The type species, Glyptodontopelta mimus, was described by Tracy Lee Ford in 2000. The holotype, USNM 8610, consists of three pieces of fused flat osteoderms, found in the Maastrichtian Ojo Alamo Formation. It was concluded to be a dubious name, a nomen dubium, in a 2004 review of the Ankylosauria, but a 2008 publication by Michael Burns concurred with Ford that its armor was distinctive enough to consider it valid. Burns also assigned Glyptodontopelta to Nodosauridae — rejecting Ford's Stegopeltinae — and proposed that another armored taxon from New Mexico, Edmontonia australis, is a synonym of Glyptodontopelta mimus, based on analysis of armor size and shape.

Most specimens referred to Glyptodontopelta comprise isolated osteoderms. The most complete known specimen, SMP VP-1580, comprises the distal part of a left lower jaw (dentary), a left supraorbital, and over a hundred osteoderms and fragments.

== See also ==
- Timeline of ankylosaur research
