= List of lost fossil sites =

This list of lost fossil sites is a list of localities in which abundant, well-preserved, or scientifically significant fossils were once found but are no longer available due to the destruction, inaccessibility or overcollection of the fossils preserved therein.

== The list ==
Site	Country	Administrative division	Age	Unit	Notable taxa	Notes	Images
E-2 Pit	Canada	Alberta					
Fossil Cycad National Monument	USA	South Dakota					

== See also ==
- List of lost, damaged, or destroyed dinosaur specimens
