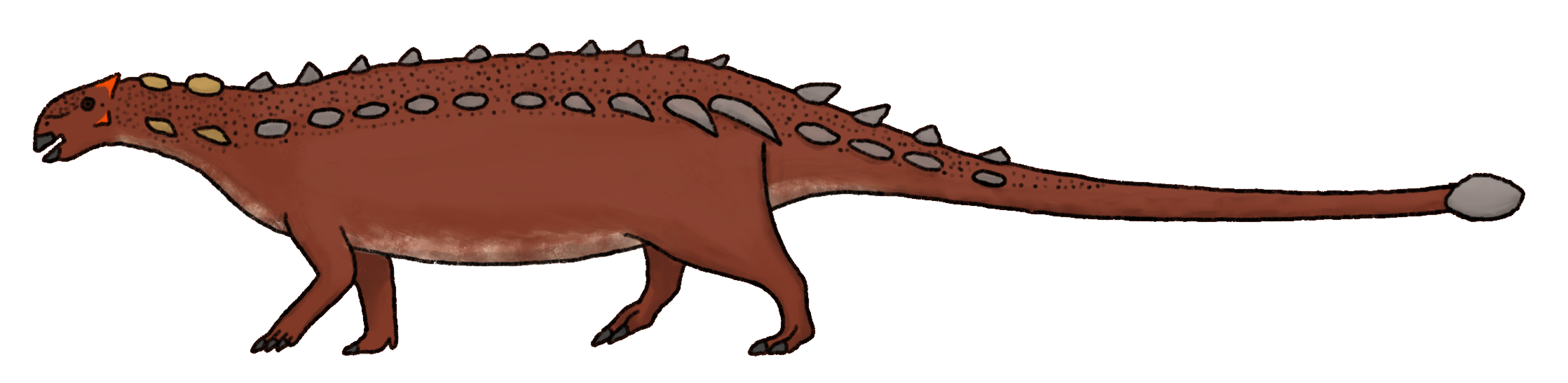
- Speculative life reconstruction

Scientific classification
- Kingdom: Animalia
- Phylum: Chordata
- Class: Reptilia
- Clade: Dinosauria
- Clade: †Ornithischia
- Clade: †Thyreophora
- Clade: †Ankylosauria
- Family: †Ankylosauridae
- Subfamily: †Ankylosaurinae
- Genus: †Bissektipelta; Parish & Barrett, 2004

Type species
- †Bissektipelta archibaldi Parish & Barrett, 2004

Synonyms
- Amtosaurus archibaldi Averianov, 2002; Amtosaurus magnus? Kurzanov & Tumanova, 1978

= Bissektipelta =

Bissektipelta Temporal range: Turonian ~92–90 Ma

Ankylosaur genus from the Late Cretaceous

Bissektipelta (meaning "Bissekty shield") is a genus of ankylosaurine thyreophoran dinosaurs that lived in Asia during the Late Cretaceous in what is now the Bissekty Formation of Uzbekistan. Bissektipelta is a monospecific genus, containing only the type species B. archibaldi.

== History of discovery ==
In September 1998, the joint Uzbek-Russian-British-American-Project excavated the braincase of an ankylosaur. In 2002, Alexandr Averianov, based on this find, named a second species of the genus Amtosaurus: Amtosaurus archibaldi. The specific name honours James David Archibald, leading the URBAC (Uzbekistan, Russia, Britain, America, & Canada) project that performed the excavation.

The holotype specimen, ZIN PH 1/6, was collected from the Bissekty Formation, dating from the late Turonian-Coniacian, of Dzharakuduk. It consists of a well-preserved, fully ossified braincase with a partial skull roof, along with isolated teeth and osteoderms.

In 2004, Jolyon Parish and Paul Barrett concluded that the type species of Amtosaurus, Amtosaurus magnus, was a nomen dubium, a dubious name. This implied that no other species could be validly referred to the genus Amtosaurus. A. archibaldi should be reassigned to a new taxon. They renamed the genus as Bissektipelta with the generic name combining a reference to the geological formation with a Latin pelta (meaning small shield), which is derived from the Greek peltè (meaning shield). The type species is the original A. archibaldi but the new combination is Bissektipelta archibaldi.

Two additional specimens were referred to by Kuzmin and colleagues in 2020. These consist of ZIN PH 281/16, a smaller but well-preserved partial braincase with open sutures between some bones and ZIN PH 2329/16, another braincase similar in size to the holotype that is slightly damaged and mixed up within the sediment layer.

== Description ==
Parish & Barrett indicated some distinguishing traits of Bissektipelta. One of these is an autapomorphy, a unique derived character. On the top skull roof grooves are present, together forming a truncated "Y" and separating three polygonal areas of flat remodelled bone tissue. These grooves reflected the position of skull osteoderms. Averianov had in 2002 proposed three traits in which A. archibaldi differed from A. magnus. Its braincase has three exits for the Nervus hypoglossus (cranial nerve XII) instead of two. It also has a more limited angle of 90° between the ventral surfaces of the basioccipital and the basisphenoid, and more caudally, to the rear, situated basipterygoid processes. In 2004, these were no longer considered unique traits but the triple exits were seen as rare.

== Classification ==
When described in 2002, Averianov placed A. archibaldi in the Ankylosauridae. Parish & Barrett thought such precision was unwarranted and placed the newly Bissektipelta in a more general Ankylosauria. However, Victoria M. Arbour and Philip J. Currie affirmed the position within the Ankylosauridae. Based on numerous cranial traits, Kuzmin and colleagues have placed Bissektipelta within the advanced Ankylosaurinae in a basal position and confirmed its valid taxonomic status.

== Paleobiology ==
In 2019, Alifanov and Saveliev redescribed the braincase noting that Bissektipelta had a well-developed olfaction, poor hearing and eyesight, good taste sensitivity, omnivorous diet and the unusual ability for filter-feeding. Also, the brain structure of Bissektipelta is rather primitive compared with other ankylosaur species. In 2020, Ivan Kuzmin and colleagues described and examined the braincase specimens of Bissektipelta in extensive detail. They performed a 3D reconstruction of the endocast of the brain cavity using CT scans and they revealed that a considerable part of the brain of Bissektipelta was occupied by olfactory bulbs, confirming that Bissektipelta had an extremely developed sense of smell. The numerous small vascular canals around the skull roof, the lateral wall of the brain case and cranial vessels form a complex network around the brain which allowed the redistribution of the blood flow and physiological mechanisms for heat exchange in order to cool-down the brain and maintain optimal temperatures. In addition, the length of the cochlear ducts in the inner ear suggests that Bissektipelta, and many other ankylosaurs, were adapted for low frequency-hearing within 100 Hz and 3000 Hz. The elongated cochlear ducts in the more advanced ankylosaurines seem to indicate that these traits were adapted for enhanced hearing at lower frequencies.

== See also ==
- Timeline of ankylosaur research
