= List of lost dinosaur specimens =

This list of lost, damaged, or destroyed dinosaur specimens enumerates those fossil dinosaur specimens that have been discovered only to be lost or damaged after initial documentation. Some of these specimens which had gone missing were later recovered as well.

== Uncollected specimens ==
Nickname	Taxon	Age	Unit	Country	Notes	Images
Nose Mountain theropod track	Tyrannosauridae	Maastrichtian	Wapiti Formation	Canada	Single highly pathological tyrannosaur footprint that was buried under a landslide before it could be collected	

== Destroyed specimens ==
Nickname	Catalogue number	Institution	Taxon	Age	Unit	Country	Notes	Images
	1912VIII61		Aegyptosaurus	Upper Cretaceous	Bahariya Formation	Egypt	Destroyed in Germany during World War II when the bombing of the museum it was held in took place.	Holotype remains
	IPHG 1922 X 47, X 48		Bahariasaurus	Upper Cretaceous	Bahariya Formation	Egypt	Destroyed in World War II	Vertebra
	IPHG 1922 X46		Tameryraptor	Upper Cretaceous		Egypt	Destroyed in World War II. Used by Ernst Stromer to erect Carcharodontosaurus for "Megalosaurus" saharicus.	Skull of the lost specimen
	MNHN 2001–4		Erectopus	Lower Cretaceous		France	Destroyed in World War II	Holotype remains
			Kentrosaurus	Upper Jurassic		Tanzania	Most specimens, although not all, were destroyed when the German museum that they were in was bombed in World War II.	
			Podokesaurus	Lower Jurassic		United States	The original specimen was destroyed in a museum fire.	Type specimen
			Poekilopleuron	Middle Jurassic		France	Destroyed in World War II	Cast of the lost gastralia
	BSP 1912 VIII 19		Spinosaurus	Lower and Upper Cretaceous	Bahariya Formation	Egypt	Destroyed in Germany during World War II when the bombing of the museum it was held in took place. More material has been discovered since.	Illustration of the destroyed specimen

== Lost specimens ==
Nickname	Catalogue number	Institution	Taxon	Age	Unit	Country	Notes	Images
Specimen 9	None		Corythosaurus			Canada		Excavation of one of the lost Corythosaurus specimens
Specimen 13	None		Corythosaurus			Canada		
Cardiodon type specimen			Cardiodon	Middle Jurassic	Forest Marble Formation	United Kingdom		Holotype tooth
Type specimen of Amphicoelias fragillimus	AMNH 5777	American Museum of Natural History	Amphicoelias fragillimus	Late Jurassic	Morrison Formation	United States	Named as the holotype of Amphicoelias fragillimus by Edward Drinker Cope and then subsequently lost. It is possible that Cope himself or someone else disposed of it, or that it crumbled because of inadequate preservation methods.	Only illustration of the vertebra
Companion tracks of MGUH 27219	N/A	Geological Museum of Copenhagen	Thyreophora	Rhaetian	Hoganas Formation	Sweden		Cast of the collected track

== Recovered specimens ==
Nickname	Catalogue number	Institution	Taxon	Age	Unit	Country	Notes	Images
Holotype of Aepisaurus elephantinus			Aepisaurus	Middle Cretaceous (Albian)		France	Named as holotype of Aepisaurus elephantinus. Rediscovered in 2006	Cast of the humerus
