= Amtosaurus =

Amtosaurus Temporal range: Late Cretaceous, Cenomanian–Turonian

Scientific classification
- Kingdom: Animalia
- Phylum: Chordata
- Class: Reptilia
- Clade: Dinosauria
- Clade: †Ornithischia
- Family: †incertae sedis
- Genus: †Amtosaurus; Kurzanov & Tumanova, 1978
- Species: †A. magnus

Binomial name
- †Amtosaurus magnus Kurzanov & Tumanova, 1978

Extinct genus of dinosaurs

Amtosaurus (/ˌɑːmtoʊˈsɔːrəs/) is a genus of ornithischian dinosaur based on a fragmentary skull collected from the Late Cretaceous (Cenomanian to Turonian) Bayanshiree Formation of Mongolia and originally believed to represent an ankylosaurid. Hadrosaurid affinities have also been suggested. However, according to Parish and Barrett, this specimen is too fragmentary to be reliably classified beyond an indeterminate ornithischian. A second species assigned to the genus, A. archibaldi, has become the basis of a valid ankylosaurid taxon, Bissektipelta.

== Discovery and species ==
The Soviet-Mongolian Paleontological Expedition of 1975 discovered two partial ankylosaur braincases in the Baynshire Formation of the Late Cretaceous of Mongolia, one from the locality Bayshin Tsav and the other from Amtgai. In 1978, Soviet paleontologists Sergei Kurzanov and Tatiana Tumanova described these braincases, which represented the first description of the region of the skull in ankylosaurs since the description of Silvisaurus in 1960. While the braincase from Bayshin Tsav, PIN 3780/1, was referred to the existing taxon Talarurus plicatospineus, the braincase from Amtgai (PIN 3780/2) was named as the new taxon Amtosaurus magnus, with the genus name referencing the type locality and the species name derived from the Latin word magnus for "large". While the location, age, and general anatomy of Amtosaurus was most similar to Talarurus, it could be separated from it and other ankylosaurs by details of the occiput.

During the 1998 expedition of the Uzbek-Russian-British-American-Canadian project a braincase of an ankylosaur was discovered in the Turonian to Coniacian Bissekty Formation of Dzarakuduk locality in Uzbekistan. This braincase was the first diagnostic ankylosaur element discovered in the Bissekty Formation, allowing comparisons to many other taxa. The braincase, ZIN PH 1/16, was described in 2002 by Russian paleontologist Alexander Averianov, who named it as a second species of Amtosaurus, A. archibaldi, after URBAC project leader J. David Archibald. From A. archibaldi, Amtosaurus was identified as an intermediate genus between earlier and later members of Ankylosauridae.

The status of Amtosaurus magnus and A. archibaldi was revisited in 2004 by British paleontologists Joylon Parrish and Paul Barrett. They found that A. magnus lacked any clear diagnostic features of Ankylosauria, or even any dinosaur clade. It has been suggested that Amtosaurus could represent a hadrosaurid, but no features of the braincase distinguish that group, so Parrish and Barrett could only classify Amtosaurus as an indeterminate member of Ornithischia. As a result of the dubious nature of A. magnus, A. archibaldi was revisited, showing clearly diagnostic features of Ankylosauria and anatomy to suggest it was a member of Ankylosauridae or Polacanthidae. As a result, A. archibaldi was moved into its own genus Bissektipelta.
