= 1850 in paleontology =

Paleontology or palaeontology is the study of prehistoric life forms on Earth through the examination of plant and animal fossils. This includes the study of body fossils, tracks (ichnites), burrows, cast-off parts, fossilised feces (coprolites), palynomorphs and chemical residues. Because humans have encountered fossils for millennia, paleontology has a long history both before and after becoming formalized as a science. This article records significant discoveries and events related to paleontology that occurred or were published in the year 1850.

== Arthropods ==
=== Insects ===
Name	Novelty	Status	Authors	Age	Unit	Location	Notes	Images
Toxorhina brevipalpa	Sp. nov	nomen nudum	Loew	Middle Eocene	Baltic amber	Europe	A Limoniid cranefly, jr syn of Elephantomyia brevipalpa	Elephantomyia brevipalpa
Toxorhina longirostris	Sp. nov	nomen nudum	Loew	Middle Eocene	Baltic amber	Europe	A Limoniid cranefly, jr syn of Elephantomyia longirostris	Elephantomyia longirostris
Toxorhina pulchella	Sp. nov	nomen nudum	Loew	Middle Eocene	Baltic amber	Europe	A Limoniid cranefly, jr syn of Elephantomyia pulchella	Elephantomyia pulchella

== Dinosaurs ==
=== Newly named dinosaurs ===
Name	Status	Authors	Country
Heterosaurus	Junior synonym	Cornuel	Belgium; England; Germany
Pelorosaurus	Valid	Mantell	England; Portugal
