= 1869 in paleontology =

Paleontology or palaeontology is the study of prehistoric life forms on Earth through the examination of plant and animal fossils. This includes the study of body fossils, tracks (ichnites), burrows, cast-off parts, fossilised feces (coprolites), palynomorphs and chemical residues. Because humans have encountered fossils for millennia, paleontology has a long history both before and after becoming formalized as a science. This article records significant discoveries and events related to paleontology that occurred or were published in the year 1869.

== Insects ==
=== New taxa ===
Name	Novelty	Status	Authors	Age	Unit	Location	Notes	Images
Elephantomyia brevipalpa	comb. nov	Valid	(Loew) Osten-Sacken	Middle Eocene	Baltic amber	Germany; Poland; Russia	A Limoniid cranefly,	Elephantomyia brevipalpa
Elephantomyia longirostris	comb. nov	Valid	(Loew) Osten-Sacken	Middle Eocene	Baltic amber	Poland; Russia	A Limoniid cranefly,	Elephantomyia longirostris
Elephantomyia pulchella	comb. nov	Valid	(Loew) Osten-Sacken	Middle Eocene	Baltic amber	Poland; Russia	A Limoniid cranefly,	Elephantomyia pulchella

== Reptiles ==
=== Turtles ===
==== New taxa ====
Taxon	Novelty	Status	Author(s)	Age	Unit	Location	Notes	Images
Rhinochelys	Gen. nov.	Valid	Seeley	Albian	Cambridge Greensand	England	A new genus for Chelone pulchriceps Owen, 1851.	
"Rhinochelys mastocephalus"	Invalid	Nomen nudum	Seeley	Albian	Cambridge Greensand	England	An informal species of turtle.	
"Rhinochelys eurycephalus"	Invalid	Nomen nudum	Seeley	Albian	Cambridge Greensand	England	An informal species of turtle.	
"Rhinochelys stenicephalus"	Invalid	Nomen nudum	Seeley	Albian	Cambridge Greensand	England	An informal species of turtle.	
"Rhinochelys cardiocephalus"	Invalid	Nomen nudum	Seeley	Albian	Cambridge Greensand	England	An informal species of turtle.	
"Rhinochelys sphenicephalus"	Invalid	Nomen nudum	Seeley	Albian	Cambridge Greensand	England	An informal species of turtle.	
"Rhinochelys dayi"	Invalid	Nomen nudum	Seeley	Albian	Cambridge Greensand	England	An informal species of turtle.	
"Rhinochelys platyrhinus"	Invalid	Nomen nudum	Seeley	Albian	Cambridge Greensand	England	An informal species of turtle.	
"Rhinochelys rheporhinus"	Invalid	Nomen nudum	Seeley	Albian	Cambridge Greensand	England	An informal species of turtle.	
"Rhinochelys graptocephalus"	Invalid	Nomen nudum	Seeley	Albian	Cambridge Greensand	England	An informal species of turtle.	
"Rhinochelys dacognathus"	Invalid	Nomen nudum	Seeley	Albian	Cambridge Greensand	England	An informal species of turtle.	
"Rhinochelys colognathus"	Invalid	Nomen nudum	Seeley	Albian	Cambridge Greensand	England	An informal species of turtle.	
"Rhinochelys dimerognathus"	Invalid	Nomen nudum	Seeley	Albian	Cambridge Greensand	England	An informal species of turtle.	
"Rhinochelys gryphus"	Invalid	Nomen nudum	Seeley	Albian	Cambridge Greensand	England	An informal species of turtle.	
"Rhinochelys platycephalus"	Invalid	Nomen nudum	Seeley	Albian	Cambridge Greensand	England	An informal species of turtle.	
"Rhinochelys leptognathus"	Invalid	Nomen nudum	Seeley	Albian	Cambridge Greensand	England	An informal species of turtle.	
"Emys sphenognathus"	Invalid	Nomen nudum	Seeley	Albian	Cambridge Greensand	England	An informal species of Emys.	
Trachydermochelys phlyctaenus	Gen. et sp. nov.	Valid	Seeley	Albian	Cambridge Greensand	England		
"Testudo cantabrigiensis"	Invalid	Nomen nudum	Seeley	Albian	Cambridge Greensand	England	An informal species of Testudo.	
Pleurosternon sedgwicki	Sp. nov.	Nomen dubium	Seeley	Berriasian	Purbeck Group	England	A species of Pleurosternon.	
Pleurosternon vansittarti	Sp. nov.	Nomen dubium	Seeley	Berriasian	Purbeck Group	England	A species of Pleurosternon.	
Pleurosternon oweni	Sp. nov.	Nomen dubium	Seeley	Berriasian	Purbeck Group	England	A species of Pleurosternon.	
Pleurosternon typocardium	Sp. nov.	Nomen dubium	Seeley	Berriasian	Purbeck Group	England	A species of Pleurosternon.	
Enaliochelys chelonia	Gen. et sp. nov.	Jr. synonym	Seeley	Kimmeridgian	Kimmeridge Clay Formation	England	Synonym of Achelonia.	

=== Crocodylomorphs ===
==== New taxa ====
Taxon	Novelty	Status	Author(s)	Age	Unit	Location	Notes	Images
"Crocodilus cantabrigiensis"	Invalid	Nomen nudum	Seeley	Albian	Cambridge Greensand	England	An informal species of Crocodilus.	
"Dakosaurus lissocephalus"	Invalid	Nomen nudum	Seeley	Kimmeridgian	Kimmeridge Clay Formation	England	An informal species of Dakosaurus.	

=== Dinosaurs ===
==== New taxa ====
Taxon	Novelty	Status	Author(s)	Age	Unit	Location	Notes	Images
"Cryptosaurus eumerus"	Invalid	Nomen nudum	Seeley	Oxfordian	Oxford Clay Formation	England	An informal designation for an informal species of dinosaur known from a femur. Named in 1875.	
Gigantosaurus megalonyx	Gen. et sp. nov.	Nomen dubium	Seeley	Kimmeridgian	Kimmeridge Clay Formation	England	A possible chimaera of non-ichthyosaur, plesiosaur, crocodilian, or turtle remains.	
Hypselosaurus priscus	Gen. et sp. nov.	Nomen dubium	Matheron	Maastrichtian	Grès à Reptiles	France	Originally believed to be a crocodilian, now a sauropod.	
Hypsibema crassicauda	Gen. et sp. nov.	Nomen dubium	Cope	Campanian	Tar Heel Formation	North Carolina		
Hypsilophodon foxii	Gen. et sp. nov.	Valid	Huxley	Barremian	Wessex Formation	England	A small and agile ornithopod.	
Ornithotarsus immanis	Gen. et sp. nov.	Nomen dubium	Cope	Campanian	Merchantville Formation	New Jersey	A hadrosaurid.	
Rhabdodon priscus	Gen. et sp. nov.	Valid	Matheron	Maastrichtian	Grès à Reptiles	France	A dwarf relative of Iguanodon.	
"Acanthopholis platypus"	Invalid	Nomen nudum	Seeley	Albian	Cambridge Greensand	England	An informal species of Acanthopholis.	
"Acanthopholis macrocercus"	Invalid	Nomen nudum	Seeley	Albian	Cambridge Greensand	England	An informal species of Acanthopholis.	
"Acanthopholis stereocercus"	Invalid	Nomen nudum	Seeley	Albian	Cambridge Greensand	England	An informal species of Acanthopholis.	
"Macrurosaurus semnus"	Invalid	Nomen nudum	Seeley	Albian	Cambridge Greensand	England	An informal genus and informal species of dinosaur.	
"Iguanodon phillipsi"	Invalid	Nomen nudum	Seeley	Barremian	Wealden Group	England	An informal species of Iguanodon. Later named Priodontognathus.	

=== Birds ===
==== New taxa ====
Taxon	Novelty	Status	Author(s)	Age	Unit	Location	Notes	Images
"Enaliornis barretti"	Invalid	Nomen nudum	Seeley	Albian	Cambridge Greensand	England	An informal genus and informal species of bird.	
"Enaliornis sedgwicki"	Invalid	Nomen nudum	Seeley	Albian	Cambridge Greensand	England	An informal species of bird.	

=== Pterosaurs ===
==== New taxa ====
Taxon	Novelty	Status	Author(s)	Age	Unit	Location	Notes	Images
Ornithocheirus	Gen. nov.	Valid	Seeley	Albian	Cambridge Greensand	England	A new genus name for multiple species including Pterodactylus simus Owen, 1861.	
"Ornithocheirus carteri"	Invalid	Nomen nudum	Seeley	Albian	Cambridge Greensand	England	An informal species of pterosaur.	
"Ornithocheirus platyrhinus"	Invalid	Nomen nudum	Seeley	Albian	Cambridge Greensand	England	An informal species of pterosaur.	
"Ptenodactylus"	Invalid	Nomen nudum	Seeley	Albian	Cambridge Greensand	England	An informal designation for multiple informal species of pterosaur including Pterodactylus sedgwicki Owen, 1859.	
"Ptenodactylus oweni"	Invalid	Nomen nudum	Seeley	Albian	Cambridge Greensand	England	An informal species of pterosaur.	
"Ptenodactylus polyodon"	Invalid	Nomen nudum	Seeley	Albian	Cambridge Greensand	England	An informal species of pterosaur.	
"Ptenodactylus microdon"	Invalid	Nomen nudum	Seeley	Albian	Cambridge Greensand	England	An informal species of pterosaur.	
"Ptenodactylus scaphorhynchus"	Invalid	Nomen nudum	Seeley	Albian	Cambridge Greensand	England	An informal species of pterosaur.	
"Ptenodactylus macrorhinus"	Invalid	Nomen nudum	Seeley	Albian	Cambridge Greensand	England	An informal species of pterosaur.	
"Ptenodactylus brachyrhinus"	Invalid	Nomen nudum	Seeley	Albian	Cambridge Greensand	England	An informal species of pterosaur.	
"Ptenodactylus crassidens"	Invalid	Nomen nudum	Seeley	Albian	Cambridge Greensand	England	An informal species of pterosaur.	
"Ptenodactylus dentatus"	Invalid	Nomen nudum	Seeley	Albian	Cambridge Greensand	England	An informal species of pterosaur.	
"Ptenodactylus nasutus"	Invalid	Nomen nudum	Seeley	Albian	Cambridge Greensand	England	An informal species of pterosaur.	
"Ptenodactylus tenuirostris"	Invalid	Nomen nudum	Seeley	Albian	Cambridge Greensand	England	An informal species of pterosaur.	
"Ptenodactylus capito"	Invalid	Nomen nudum	Seeley	Albian	Cambridge Greensand	England	An informal species of pterosaur.	
"Ptenodactylus eurygnathus"	Invalid	Nomen nudum	Seeley	Albian	Cambridge Greensand	England	An informal species of pterosaur.	
"Ptenodactylus machaerorhynchus"	Invalid	Nomen nudum	Seeley	Albian	Cambridge Greensand	England	An informal species of pterosaur.	
"Ptenodactylus platystomus"	Invalid	Nomen nudum	Seeley	Albian	Cambridge Greensand	England	An informal species of pterosaur.	
"Ptenodactylus enchorhynchus"	Invalid	Nomen nudum	Seeley	Albian	Cambridge Greensand	England	An informal species of pterosaur.	
"Ptenodactylus colorhinus"	Invalid	Nomen nudum	Seeley	Albian	Cambridge Greensand	England	An informal species of pterosaur.	
"Ptenodactylus oxyrhinus"	Invalid	Nomen nudum	Seeley	Albian	Cambridge Greensand	England	An informal species of pterosaur.	
Pterodactylus macrurus	Sp. nov.	Nomen dubium	Seeley	Berriasian	Purbeck Group	England	A species of Pterodactylus.	

=== Ichthyosaurs ===
==== New taxa ====
Taxon	Novelty	Status	Author(s)	Age	Unit	Location	Notes	Images
"Ichthyosaurus angustidens"	Invalid	Nomen nudum	Seeley	Cenomanian	Chalk Group	England	An informal species of Ichthyosaurus.	
"Ichthyosaurus walkeri"	Invalid	Nomen nudum	Seeley	Albian	Cambridge Greensand	England	An informal species of Ichthyosaurus.	
"Ichthyosaurus doughtyi"	Invalid	Nomen nudum	Seeley	Albian	Cambridge Greensand	England	An informal species of Ichthyosaurus.	
"Ichthyosaurus bonneyi"	Invalid	Nomen nudum	Seeley	Albian	Cambridge Greensand	England	An informal species of Ichthyosaurus.	
"Ichthyosaurus platymerus"	Invalid	Nomen nudum	Seeley	Albian	Cambridge Greensand	England	An informal species of Ichthyosaurus.	
"Ichthyosaurus chalarodeirus"	Invalid	Nomen nudum	Seeley	Kimmeridgian	Kimmeridge Clay Formation	England	An informal species of Ichthyosaurus.	
"Ichthyosaurus hygrodeirus"	Invalid	Nomen nudum	Seeley	Kimmeridgian	Kimmeridge Clay Formation	England	An informal species of Ichthyosaurus.	
Ichthyosaurus megalodeirus	Sp. nov.	Nomen dubium	Seeley	Oxfordian	Oxford Clay Formation	England	A species of Ichthyosaurus.	

=== Plesiosaurs ===
==== New taxa ====
Taxon	Novelty	Status	Author(s)	Age	Unit	Location	Notes	Images
Crymocetus		Valid	Cope					
Polycotylus		Valid	Cope			France; (Alabama, Kansas and Wyoming)	An advanced Short-Necked plesiosaur.	Polycotylus
"Plesiosaurus ichthyospondylus"	Invalid	Nomen nudum	Seeley	Albian	Cambridge Greensand	England	An informal species of Plesiosaurus.	
"Plesiosaurus cycnodeirus"	Invalid	Nomen nudum	Seeley	Albian	Cambridge Greensand	England	An informal species of Plesiosaurus.	
"Plesiosaurus microdeirus"	Invalid	Nomen nudum	Seeley	Albian	Cambridge Greensand	England	An informal species of Plesiosaurus.	
"Plesiosaurus euryspondylus"	Invalid	Nomen nudum	Seeley	Albian	Cambridge Greensand	England	An informal species of Plesiosaurus.	
"Plesiosaurus platydeirus"	Invalid	Nomen nudum	Seeley	Albian	Cambridge Greensand	England	An informal species of Plesiosaurus.	
"Plesiosaurus ophiodeirus"	Invalid	Nomen nudum	Seeley	Albian	Cambridge Greensand	England	An informal species of Plesiosaurus.	
"Plesiosaurus paecilospondylus"	Invalid	Nomen nudum	Seeley	Albian	Cambridge Greensand	England	An informal species of Plesiosaurus.	
"Stereosaurus"	Invalid	Nomen nudum	Seeley	Albian	Cambridge Greensand	England	An informal genus for species including Polyptychodon interruptus.	
"Stereosaurus platyomus"	Invalid	Nomen nudum	Seeley	Albian	Cambridge Greensand	England	An informal species of plesiosaur.	
"Stereosaurus cratynotus"	Invalid	Nomen nudum	Seeley	Albian	Cambridge Greensand	England	An informal species of plesiosaur.	
"Stereosaurus stenomus"	Invalid	Nomen nudum	Seeley	Albian	Cambridge Greensand	England	An informal species of plesiosaur.	
"Plesiosaurus megadeirus"	Invalid	Nomen nudum	Seeley	Kimmeridgian	Kimmeridge Clay Formation	England	An informal species of Plesiosaurus.	
"Plesiosaurus sterrodeirus"	Invalid	Nomen nudum	Seeley	Kimmeridgian	Kimmeridge Clay Formation	England	An informal species of Plesiosaurus.	
"Pliosaurus evansi"	Invalid	Nomen nudum	Seeley	Oxfordian	Oxford Clay Formation	England	An informal species of Pliosaurus.	
"Pliosaurus pachydeirus"	Invalid	Nomen nudum	Seeley	Oxfordian	Oxford Clay Formation	England	An informal species of Pliosaurus.	
"Plesiosaurus philarchus"	Invalid	Nomen nudum	Seeley	Oxfordian	Oxford Clay Formation	England	An informal species of Plesiosaurus.	
"Steneosaurus dasycephalus"	Invalid	Nomen nudum	Seeley	Oxfordian	Oxford Clay Formation	England	An informal species of plesiosaur.	

== Paleontologists ==
- Death of German Paleontologist Christian Erich Hermann von Meyer.
