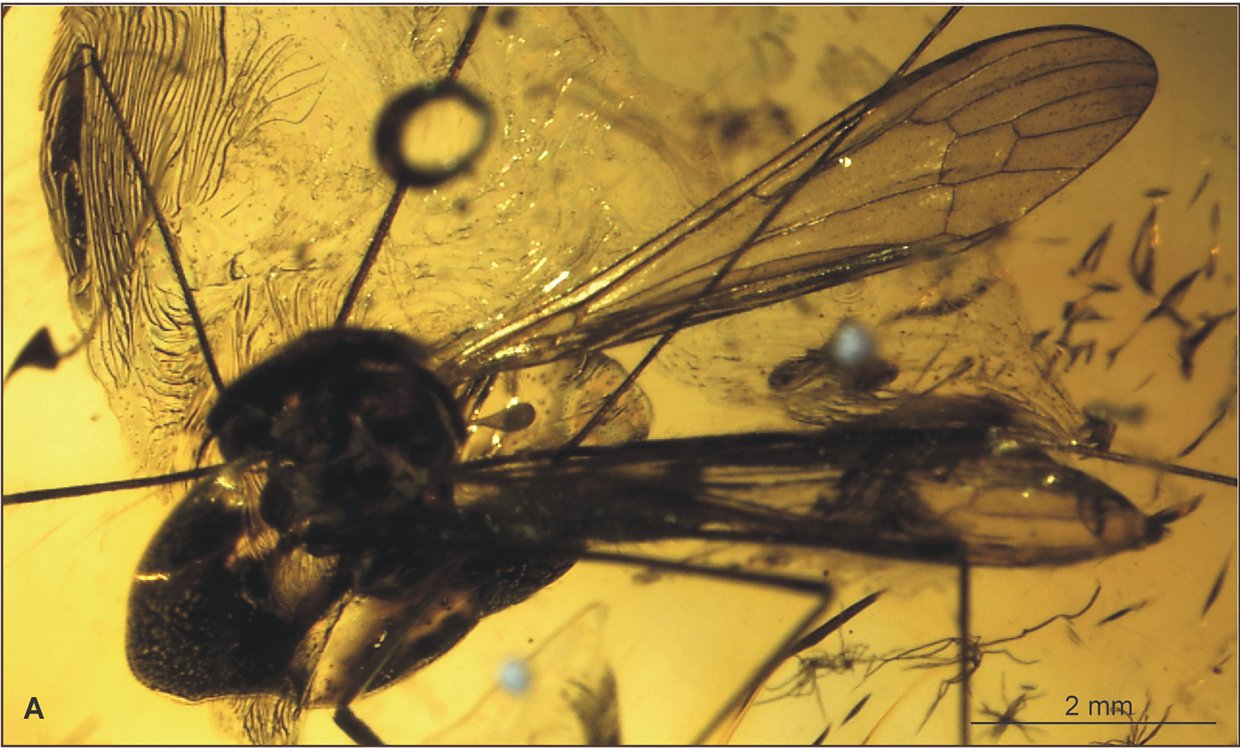
- E. (E.) irinae body

Scientific classification
- Kingdom: Animalia
- Phylum: Arthropoda
- Clade: Pancrustacea
- Class: Insecta
- Order: Diptera
- Family: Limoniidae
- Genus: Elephantomyia
- Species: †E. irinae

Binomial name
- †Elephantomyia irinae Kania, 2015

= Elephantomyia irinae =

Elephantomyia irinae Temporal range: Middle Eocene

Extinct species of fly

Elephantomyia (Elephantomyia) irinae is an extinct species of crane fly in the family Limoniidae. The species is solely known from the Middle Eocene Baltic amber deposits in the Baltic Sea region of Europe. The species is one of six described from Baltic amber.

== History and classification ==
Elephantomyia (Elephantomyia) irinae is known from five male insects, the holotype specimen, collection number MP/3324, and four additional flies which are preserved as inclusions in transparent Baltic amber. As of 2015, the amber specimens were included in the collections of the Polish Academy of Sciences. Baltic amber is recovered from fossil bearing rocks in the Baltic Sea region of Europe. Estimates of the age date between 37 million years old, for the youngest sediments and 48 million years old. This age range straddles the middle Eocene, ranging from near the beginning of the Lutetian to the beginning of the Pribonian. E. irinae is one of six crane fly species in the genus Elephantomyia described from the Baltic amber, the others being E. baltica, E. brevipalpa, E. bozenae, E. longirostris, and E. pulchella. All six species are placed into the Elephantomyia subgenus Elephantomyia based on the lack of tibial spurs and by several aspects of the wing morphology.

The five specimens were first studied by paleoentomologist Iwona Kania, of the University of Rzeszów, whose 2015 type description for the species was published in the journal PLoS ONE. The specific epithet irinae was coined to honor the biologist Irina D. Sukatsheva.

== Description ==
The E. irinae type specimen is a well preserved male that is approximately 9.5 mm (0.37 in) long, not including the rostrum. The head has a rostrum that is 2.41–2.82 mm (0.095–0.111 in) long, just over half the length of the fore-wing and shorter than the abdomen. The tip of the rostrum has elongate palpus at the tip. Each palpus is composed of four segments, with the basal three segments long and the apical segment short. The antennae are small, composed fifteen segments. They have an elongated scape and widened pedicle. The first of the flagellomeres and segments third to fifteen are all elongated while the second is notably short. Flagellomeres two to fourteen all have three setae on them that are longer than the segment bearing them. Flagellomere fifteen has four setae also longer than the segment. The wings are between 3.49 and 8.5 mm (0.137 and 0.335 in) long with a pale brown pterostigma that is oval in shape. The D cell, as designated by the Comstock–Needham system, is not as elongated and narrowed as in E. bozenae having a length to width ratio of only 1.5 to 1, while E. bozenae has a 2 to 1 ratio.
