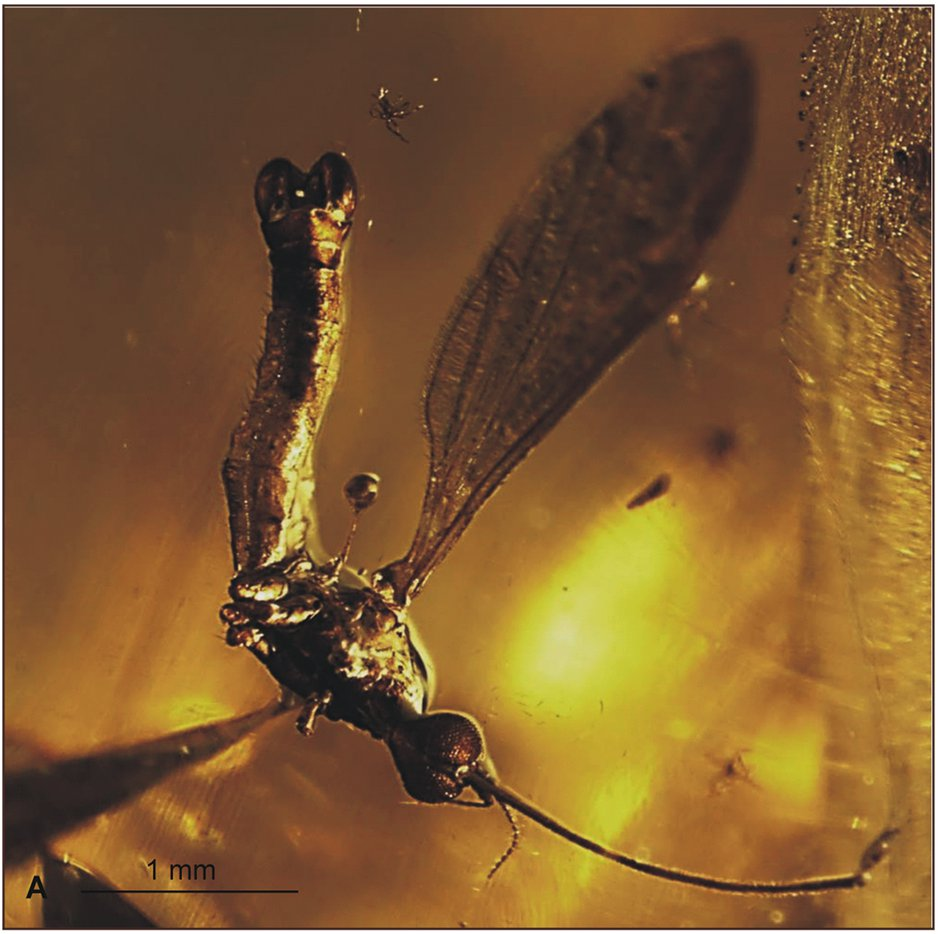
- E. (E.) bozenae holotype

Scientific classification
- Kingdom: Animalia
- Phylum: Arthropoda
- Clade: Pancrustacea
- Class: Insecta
- Order: Diptera
- Family: Limoniidae
- Genus: Elephantomyia
- Species: †E. bozenae

Binomial name
- †Elephantomyia bozenae Kania, 2015

= Elephantomyia bozenae =

Elephantomyia bozenae Temporal range: Middle Eocene

Extinct species of fly

Elephantomyia (Elephantomyia) bozenae is an extinct species of crane fly in the family Limoniidae. The species is solely known from the Middle Eocene Baltic amber deposits in the Baltic Sea region of Europe. The species is one of six described from Baltic amber.

== History and classification ==
Elephantomyia (Elephantomyia) bozenae is known only from the holotype specimen, collection number MP/3338, which is preserved as an inclusion in transparent Baltic amber. As of 2015, the amber specimen was included in the collections of the Polish Academy of Sciences. Baltic amber is recovered from fossil bearing rocks in the Baltic Sea region of Europe. Estimates of the age date between 37 million years old, for the youngest sediments and 48 million years old. This age range straddles the middle Eocene, ranging from near the beginning of the Lutetian to the beginning of the Pribonian. E. bozenae is one of six crane fly species in the genus Elephantomyia described from the Baltic amber, the others being E. baltica, E. brevipalpa, E. irinae, E. longirostris, and E. pulchella. All six species are placed into the Elephantomyia subgenus Elephantomyia based on the lack of tibial spurs and by several aspects of the wing morphology.

The type specimen was first studied by paleoentomologist Iwona Kania, of the University of Rzeszów, whose 2015 type description for the species was published in the journal PLoS ONE. The specific epithet bozenae was coined to honor the biologist Bożena Szala.

== Description ==
The E. bozenae type specimen is a well preserved male that is approximately 3.1 mm (0.12 in) long, not including the rostrum. The head has a rostrum that is 2.14 mm (0.084 in) long, just over half the length of the fore-wing and longer than the abdomen. The tip of the rostrum has elongate palpus at the tip. Each palpus is composed of four segments, with the basal three segments long and the apical segment short. All four segments host a system of microtrichia. The antennae are small, composed fifteen segments. They have an elongated scape and widened pedicle. As the flagellomeres progress from the base to the tip of the antennae they change from squat and crowded together to elongated and the apical segment is widened at the tip. All of the flagellomeres host two setae each. The wings are 3.56 mm (0.140 in) long with a pale brown pterostigma that is oval in shape. The D cell, as designated by the Comstock–Needham system, is notably elongated and narrowed, in comparison to all other Baltic amber Elephantomyia.
