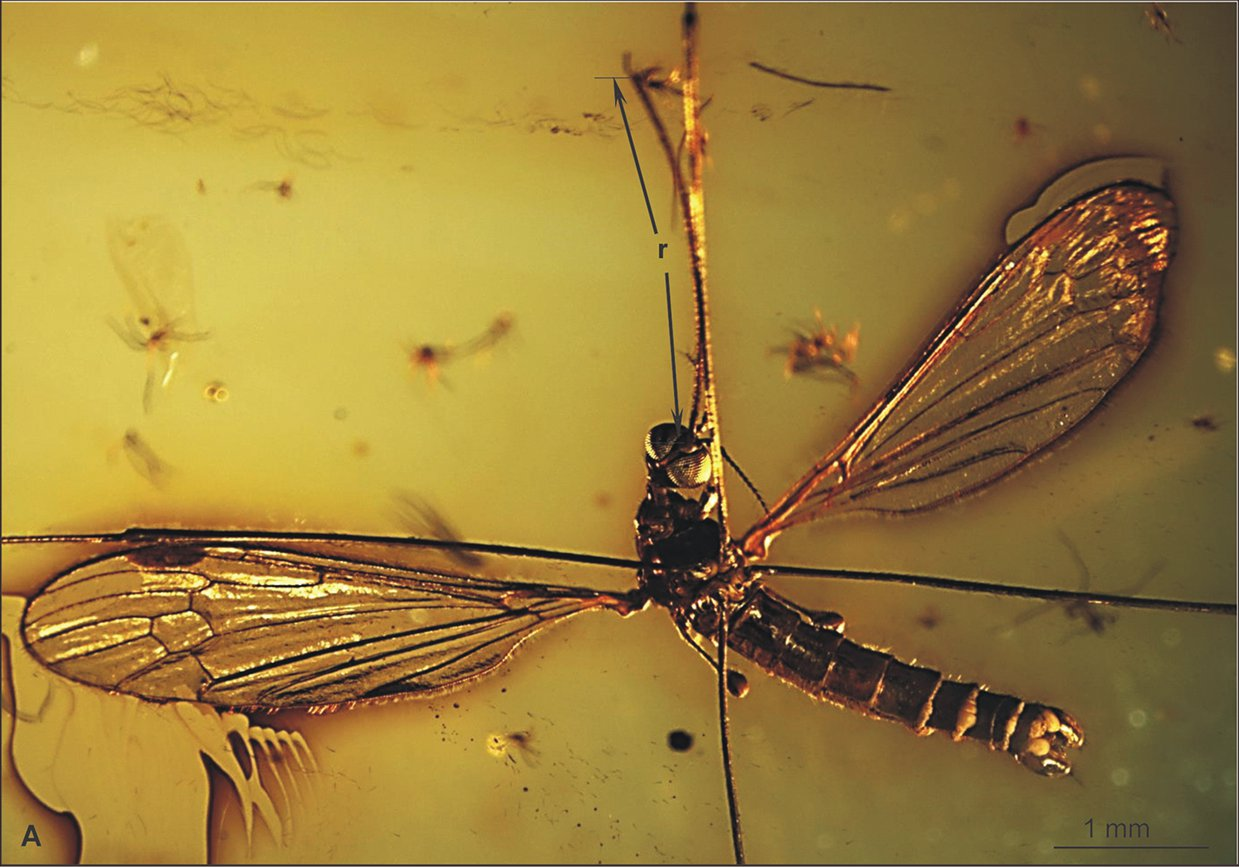
- E. (E.) pulchella male

Scientific classification
- Kingdom: Animalia
- Phylum: Arthropoda
- Clade: Pancrustacea
- Class: Insecta
- Order: Diptera
- Family: Limoniidae
- Genus: Elephantomyia
- Species: †E. pulchella

Binomial name
- †Elephantomyia pulchella (Loew, 1850)

Synonyms
- Toxorhina pulchella; Limnobiorhynchus pulchella

= Elephantomyia pulchella =

Elephantomyia pulchella Temporal range: Middle Eocene

Extinct species of fly

Elephantomyia (Elephantomyia) pulchella is an extinct species of crane fly in the family Limoniidae. The species is solely known from the Middle Eocene Baltic amber deposits in the Baltic Sea region of Europe. The species is one of six described from Baltic amber.

== History and classification ==
Elephantomyia (Elephantomyia) pulchella is known from the holotype specimen, collection number MB.J.336, along with two further adults which are preserved as inclusions in transparent Baltic amber. As of 2015, the holotype specimen was included in the collections of the Natural History Museum Humboldt University, while another was housed at the Polish Academy of Sciences, and the last resided in a private collection. Baltic amber is recovered from fossil bearing rocks in the Baltic Sea region of Europe. Estimates of the age date between 37 million years old, for the youngest sediments and 48 million years old. This age range straddles the middle Eocene, ranging from near the beginning of the Lutetian to the beginning of the Pribonian.

E. pulchella is one of six crane fly species in the genus Elephantomyia described from the Baltic amber, the others being E. baltica, E. bozenae, E. brevipalpa, E. irinae, and E. longirostris. All six species are placed into the Elephantomyia subgenus Elephantomyia based on the lack of tibial spurs and by several aspects of the wing morphology.

The fossil was first studied by entomologist Hermann Loew of the Germany, with his type description of the new species being published in 1851 as Toxorhina pulchella, though he published the nomen nudum name a year earlier. The species was moved to the genus Limnobiorhynchus in 1860 by Carl Robert Osten-Sacken, and later moved by Osten-Sacken again, this time to the genus Elephantomyia. The fossils were reexamined and the species redescribed in 2015 by paleoentomologist Iwona Kania of the University of Rzeszów, who examined the holotype and the two additional specimens.

== Description ==
All studied E. pulchella type specimens are preserved males, with the females of the species unknown as of 2015. The body length ranges from approximately 3.42–3.63 mm (0.135–0.143 in) long, not including the rostrum. The head has a rostrum which is similar in length to the abdomen and about two-thirds the wing length, being between 2.22–2.77 mm (0.087–0.109 in) long. This rostrum to wing and abdomen ratio is not seen in the other described Baltic amber Elephantomyia. The rostrum has elongated palpus at the tip, each composed of four segments and having a system of microtrichia hairs. The basal three palpus segments are elongated cylinders, while the apical segments are shortest. The fifteen segmented antennae are small, composed of an elongated scape, widened pedicle and thirteen flagellomeres. As the flagellomeres progress from the base to the tip of the antennae they change from squat and crowded together to elongated. The five flagellomeres at the base have two long setae on them, while the next three flagellomeres have three setae. Flagellomeres ten to thirteen have four setae each, while the elongated segments fourteen and fifteen do not have any. The wings are between 3.8–4.5 mm (0.15–0.18 in) long with a pale brown pterostigma that is oval in shape. The Rs vein, as designated by the Comstock–Needham system, is slightly curved and about 5 times the length of the base segment of the R_{5} vein. The Rs is shorter than the length of the connected R_{2+3+4} vein.
