= Aleksander Bobko =

Polish philosopher

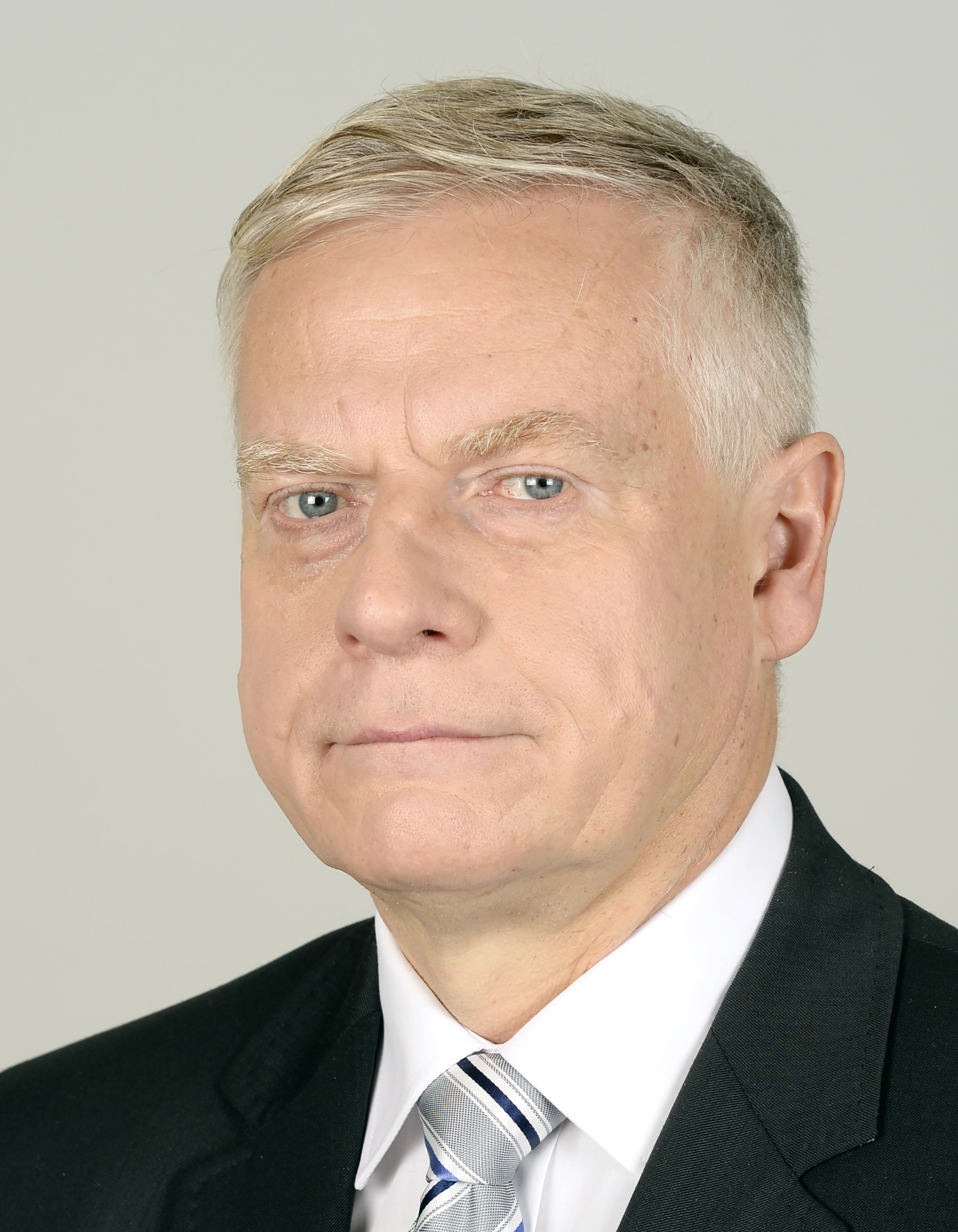

Deputy Minister of Science and Higher Education
- Incumbent
- Assumed office 16 November 2015
- Preceded by: Marek Ratajczak

Personal details
- Born: March 23, 1960 (age 66) Warsaw, Poland

Aleksander Bobko (born 23 March 1960) is the Deputy Minister of Science and Higher Education of Poland. He was previously the rector of Rzeszów University.

== Biography ==
Bobko graduated in informatics from the AGH University of Science and Technology. He also earned advanced degrees in philosophy, including a doctorate and a habilitation, at the Pontifical University of John Paul II and at the Jagiellonian University. In the years 1998–2002, Bobko was a member of the city council of Rzeszów.

He was affiliated with the Pontifical University of John Paul II, later joining the faculty at Rzeszów University. Bobko was vice dean (2002-2004) and dean (2004-2008) of the Faculty of Sociology and History, and then vice rector for research and international relations (2008-2012).

In 2009 Bobko was granted a state professorship of the humanities. In 2012 he was appointed rector of Rzeszów University, a position he held until 2015.

In 2015 he was elected to the Senate of Poland. Bobko was appointed as the Deputy Minister of Science and Higher Education on 16 November 2015.

== Bibliography ==
- Aleksander Bobko — Rzeszów University
- Aleksander Bobko — OPI
