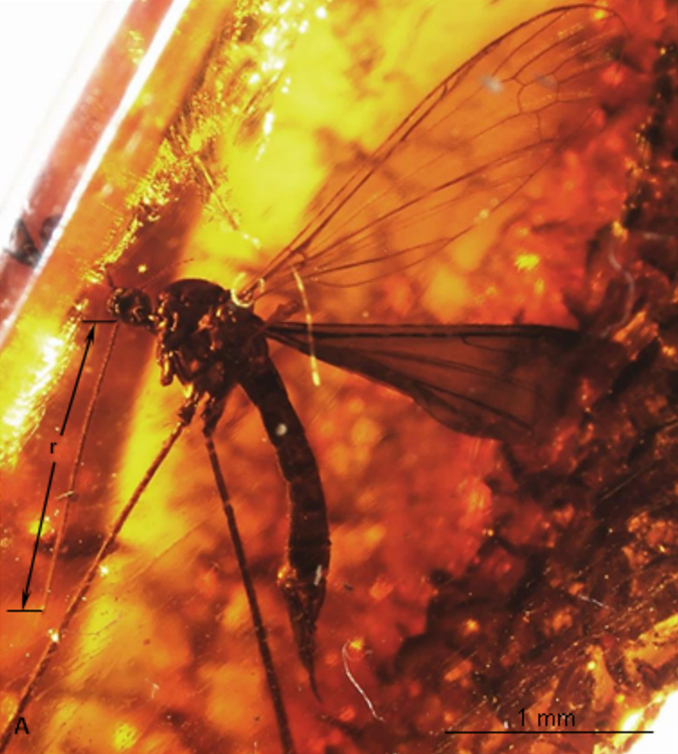
- E. (E.) brevipalpa female

Scientific classification
- Kingdom: Animalia
- Phylum: Arthropoda
- Clade: Pancrustacea
- Class: Insecta
- Order: Diptera
- Family: Limoniidae
- Genus: Elephantomyia
- Species: †E. brevipalpa

Binomial name
- †Elephantomyia brevipalpa (Loew, 1850)

Synonyms
- Toxorhina brevipalpa; Limnobiorhynchus brevipalpa

= Elephantomyia brevipalpa =

Elephantomyia brevipalpa Temporal range: Middle Eocene

Extinct species of fly

Elephantomyia (Elephantomyia) brevipalpa is an extinct species of crane fly in the family Limoniidae. The species is solely known from the Middle Eocene Baltic amber deposits in the Baltic Sea region of Europe. The species is one of six described from Baltic amber.

== History and classification ==
Elephantomyia (Elephantomyia) brevipalpa is known from the holotype specimen, collection number MB.J.337, along with two further adults which are preserved as inclusions in transparent Baltic amber. As of 2015, two of the amber specimens were included in the collections of the University of Göttingen, while the third was housed at the Polish Academy of Sciences. Baltic amber is recovered from fossil bearing rocks in the Baltic Sea region of Europe. Estimates of the age date between 37 million years old, for the youngest sediments and 48 million years old. This age range straddles the middle Eocene, ranging from near the beginning of the Lutetian to the beginning of the Pribonian. E. brevipalpa is one of six crane fly species in the genus Elephantomyia described from the Baltic amber, the others being E. baltica, E. bozenae, E. irinae, E. longirostris, and E. pulchella. All six species are placed into the Elephantomyia subgenus Elephantomyia based on the lack of tibial spurs and by several aspects of the wing morphology.

The fossil was first studied by entomologist Hermann Loew of the Germany, with his type description of the new species being published in 1851 as Toxorhina brevipalpa, though he published the nomen nudum name a year earlier. The species was moved to the genus Limnobiorhynchus in 1860 by Carl Robert Osten-Sacken, and later moved by Osten-Sacken again, this time to the genus Elephantomyia. The fossil was reexamined and the species redescribed in 2015 by paleoentomologist Iwona Kania of the University of Rzeszów, who examined the holotype and the two additional specimens.

== Description ==
The E. brevipalpa type specimen and one of the additional specimens are preserved males, while the third specimen is a female that is approximately 5.1 mm (0.20 in) long, not including the rostrum. The head has a rostrum that is 2.86 mm (0.113 in) long, as half the length of the fore-wing and the abdomen. The rostrum has notably short palpus at the tip. Each palpus is composed of four segments, totaling less than half the length of the glossal lobes on the rostrum. The third segment is an elongate cylinders while the fourth is very short. The antennae are small, composed of an elongated scape and widened pedicle. As the flagellomeres progress from the base to the tip of the antennae they change from squat and crowded together to elongated. The basal flagellomeres have no setae, while three setae are found on flagellomeres 6 and 7. Flagellomeres 8 through 11 have two elongated setae, and the apical flagellomere has four very elongate setae. The wings are 4.68 mm (0.184 in) long with a pale brown pterostigma that is oval in shape and further towards the wing base then in other Baltic amber species. The Rs vein, as designated by the Comstock–Needham system, is as about one third the length of the connected R_{2+3+4} vein.
