= Sylwester Czopek =

Rector of Rzeszów University in Poland

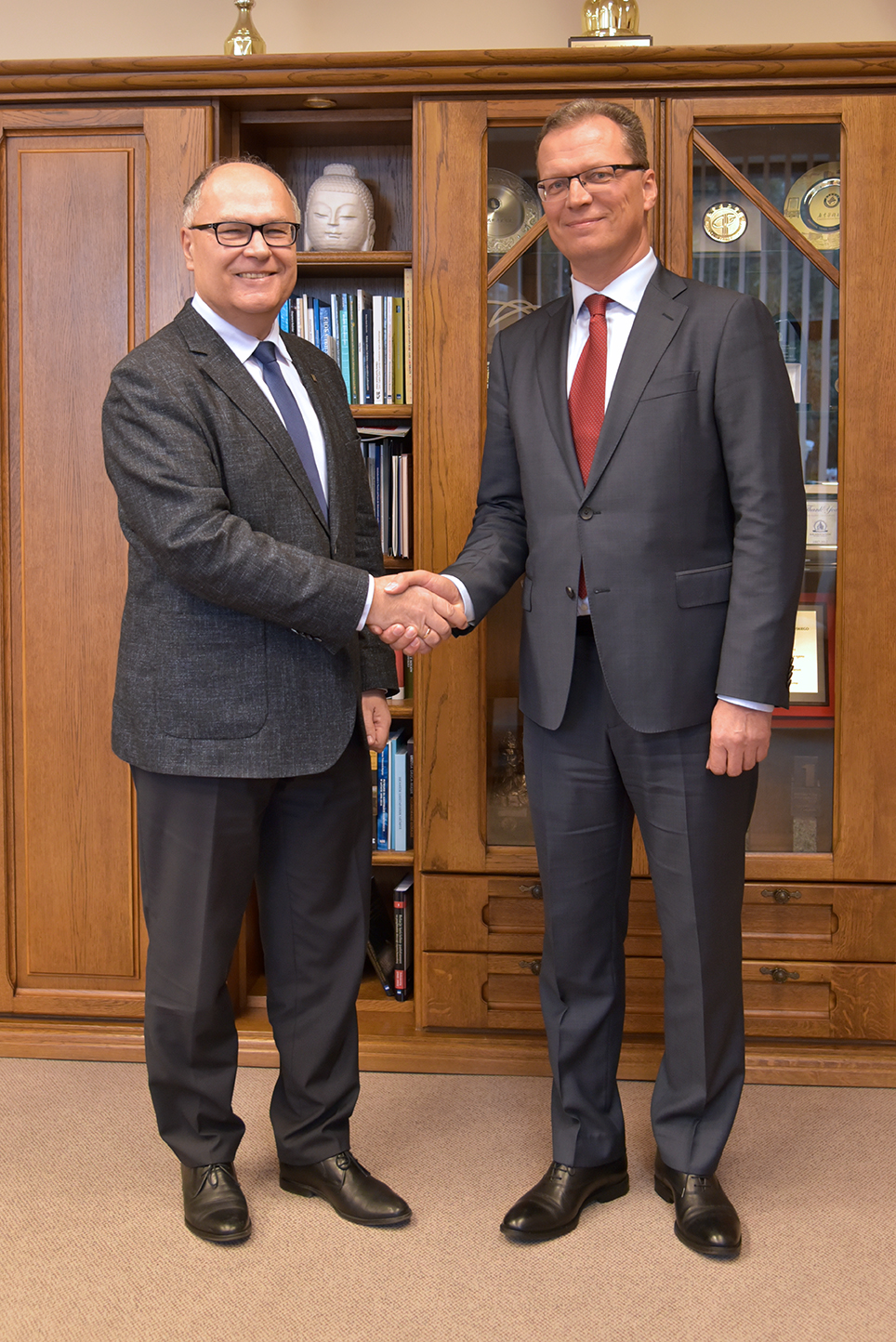
Sylwester Czopek, Krzysztof Strzałka

Sylwester Czopek (born 1958 in Bełżyce) is the rector of Rzeszów University. He is an archaeologist and museologist. In 2011 Czopek received the Knight's Cross of the Order of Polonia Restituta.

== Bibliography ==
- Sylwester Czopek — OPI
