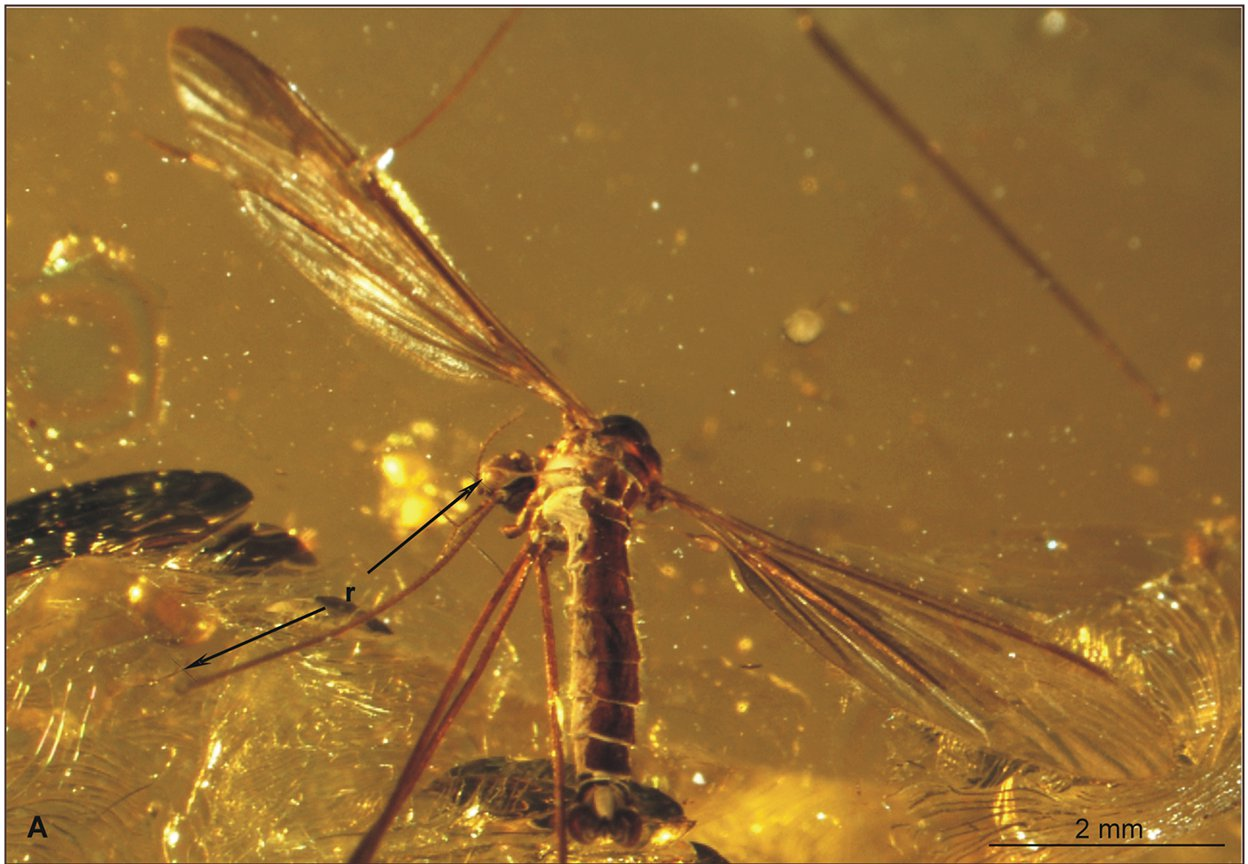
- E. (E.) longirostris male

Scientific classification
- Kingdom: Animalia
- Phylum: Arthropoda
- Clade: Pancrustacea
- Class: Insecta
- Order: Diptera
- Family: Limoniidae
- Genus: Elephantomyia
- Species: †E. longirostris

Binomial name
- †Elephantomyia longirostris (Loew, 1850)

Synonyms
- Toxorhina longirostris; Limnobiorhynchus longirostris

= Elephantomyia longirostris =

Elephantomyia longirostris Temporal range: Middle Eocene

Extinct species of fly

Elephantomyia (Elephantomyia) longirostris is an extinct species of crane fly in the family Limoniidae. The species is solely known from the Middle Eocene Baltic amber deposits in the Baltic Sea region of Europe. The species is one of six in its genus described from Baltic amber.

== History and classification ==
Elephantomyia (Elephantomyia) longirostris is known from the holotype specimen, collection number MB.J.337, along with ten further adults which are preserved as inclusions in transparent Baltic amber. As of 2015, nine of the amber specimens were included in the collections of the Polish Academy of Sciences, while another was housed at the Natural History Museum Humboldt University, and the last resided in a private collection. Baltic amber is recovered from fossil bearing rocks in the Baltic Sea region of Europe. Estimates of the age date between 37 million years old, for the youngest sediments and 48 million years old. This age range straddles the middle Eocene, ranging from near the beginning of the Lutetian to the beginning of the Pribonian.

E. longirostris is one of six crane fly species in the genus Elephantomyia described from the Baltic amber, the others being E. baltica, E. bozenae, E. brevipalpa, E. irinae, and E. pulchella. All six species are placed into the Elephantomyia subgenus Elephantomyia based on the lack of tibial spurs and by several aspects of the wing morphology.

The fossil was first studied by entomologist Hermann Loew of the Germany, with his type description of the new species being published in 1851 as Toxorhina longirostris, though he published the nomen nudum name a year earlier. The species was moved to the genus Limnobiorhynchus in 1860 by Carl Robert Osten-Sacken, and later moved by Osten-Sacken again, this time to the genus Elephantomyia. The fossils were reexamined and the species redescribed in 2015 by paleoentomologist Iwona Kania of the University of Rzeszów, who examined the holotype and the ten additional specimens. Kania noted that two of the specimens Loew had placed into the species did not match the type description or redescription well, each having a notably short rostrom. Further study of the two was suggested to clarify the species and genus they belong to.

== Description ==
The E. longirostris type specimen and nine of the additional specimens are preserved males, while the eleventh specimen is a female. The body length ranges from approximately 3.00–4.91 mm (0.118–0.193 in) long, not including the rostrum. The head has a rostrum which is longer than any other Baltic amber species. At 2.66–4.20 mm (0.105–0.165 in) long it is 4/5 the length of the wings and about equal to the entire body length. The rostrum has elongated palpus at the tip, each composed of four segments and having a system of microtrichia hairs. The basal three palpus segments are elongated cylinders, while the apical segments are shortest. The fifteen segmented antennae are small, composed of an elongated scape, widened pedicle and thirteen flagellomeres. As the flagellomeres progress from the base to the tip of the antennae they change from squat and crowded together to elongated. All of the flagellomeres have four setae on them and the setae are each much longer than the flagellomere segments. The wings are between 4.3–8.5 mm (0.17–0.33 in) long with a pale brown pterostigma that is oval in shape and further towards the wing base then in other Baltic amber species. The Rs vein, as designated by the Comstock–Needham system, is as then the length of the connected R_{2+3+4} vein.
