= Toxorhina muliebris =

Scientific classification
- Domain: Eukaryota
- Kingdom: Animalia
- Phylum: Arthropoda
- Class: Insecta
- Order: Diptera
- Family: Limoniidae
- Genus: Toxorhina
- Species: T. muliebris

Binomial name
- Toxorhina muliebris Osten Sacken, 1865

Species of fly

Toxorhina muliebris is a species of limoniid crane fly in the family Limoniidae. The adult of the species can be found flying in mid-June to August on the East Coast of North America from Quebec to Virginia and as far west as Wisconsin. Its grayish color is the most obvious difference from the yellowish brown Toxorhina magna which is found in the southern parts of the range of T. muliebris.
