= Toxorhina alexanderi =

Scientific classification
- Domain: Eukaryota
- Kingdom: Animalia
- Phylum: Arthropoda
- Class: Insecta
- Order: Diptera
- Family: Limoniidae
- Genus: Toxorhina
- Species: T. alexanderi

Binomial name
- Toxorhina alexanderi Tjeder, 1981

Species of fly

Toxorhina alexanderi is a species of limoniid crane fly in the family Limoniidae. This tropical African species is known from a specimen taken in The Gambia, stored at the Lund Museum of Zoology Insect Collection at Lund University in Lund, Sweden.
