= Toxorhina approximata =

Scientific classification
- Domain: Eukaryota
- Kingdom: Animalia
- Phylum: Arthropoda
- Class: Insecta
- Order: Diptera
- Family: Limoniidae
- Genus: Toxorhina
- Species: T. approximata

Binomial name
- Toxorhina approximata Alexander, 1951

Species of fly

Toxorhina approximata is a species of limoniid crane fly in the family Limoniidae. This species is known from a specimen taken at 1500 meters on Mt. Tsaratanana in Madagascar. The specimen is now stored at the United States National Museum of Natural History.
