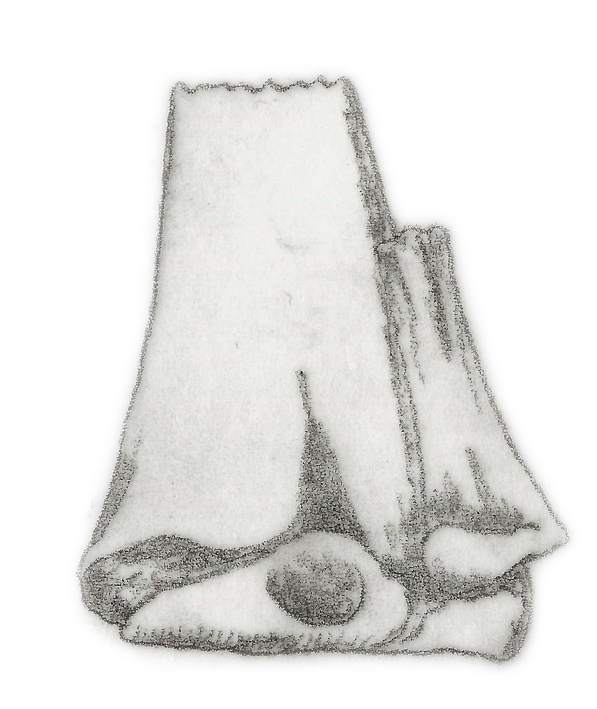
- Holotype of Ornithotarsus immanis

Scientific classification
- Kingdom: Animalia
- Phylum: Chordata
- Class: Reptilia
- Clade: Dinosauria
- Clade: †Ornithischia
- Clade: †Ornithopoda
- Family: †Hadrosauridae
- Genus: †Ornithotarsus; Cope, 1869
- Species: †O. immanis

Binomial name
- †Ornithotarsus immanis Cope, 1869

= Ornithotarsus =

Ornithotarsus Temporal range: Late Cretaceous, ~80–78 Ma

Hadrosaurid dinosaur genus from the Late Cretaceous

Ornithotarsus (lit. 'bird ankle') is a genus of hadrosaurid ornithopod dinosaurs that lived in North America during the Late Cretaceous Period in what is now the Merchantville Formation about 84 million to 78 million years ago.

== Taxonomy ==
Ornithotarsus immanis was described in 1869 on the basis of YPM 3221, a fragmentary hindlimb comprising a distal tibia and fibula as well as ankle bones unearthed from the Merchantville Formation of Raritan Bay of New Jersey. Although subsequently treated as a synonym of Hadrosaurus, Prieto-Marquez et al. (2006) found Ornithotarsus to share no diagnostic traits with the H. foulkii holotype and declared it a nomen dubium undetermined beyond Hadrosauridae, and Brownstein (2021) agreed with this assessment.
