= Toxorhina magna =

Scientific classification
- Domain: Eukaryota
- Kingdom: Animalia
- Phylum: Arthropoda
- Class: Insecta
- Order: Diptera
- Family: Limoniidae
- Genus: Toxorhina
- Species: T. magna

Binomial name
- Toxorhina magna Osten Sacken, 1865

Species of fly

Toxorhina magna is a species of limoniid crane fly in the family Limoniidae. This species can be found on the East Coast of the United States as far west as Michigan and as far south as Florida. Its yellowish brown color its most obvious difference from the grayish Toxorhina muliebris which is found in the northern parts of T. magna's range.
