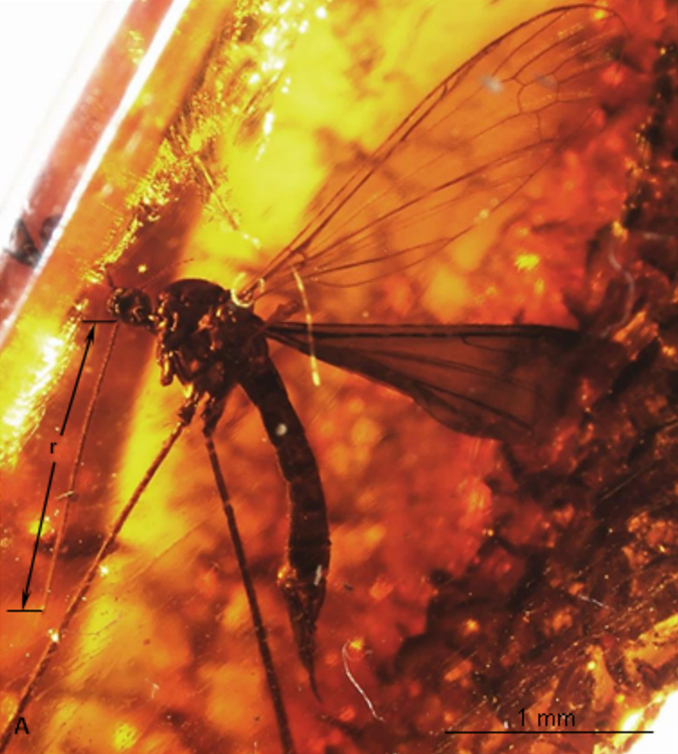
- E. (E.) brevipalpa female

Scientific classification
- Kingdom: Animalia
- Phylum: Arthropoda
- Class: Insecta
- Order: Diptera
- Family: Limoniidae
- Subfamily: Limoniinae
- Genus: Elephantomyia; Osten Sacken, 1860

Type species
- Limnobiorhynchus canadensis Westwood, 1835 [= westwoodi Osten Sacken, 1869]

Subgenera
- Elephantomyia Osten Sacken, 1860; Elephantomyina Alexander, 1938; Elephantomyodes Alexander, 1923; Xenoelephantomyia Alexander, 1965

= Elephantomyia =

Elephantomyia Temporal range: Middle Eocene–Recent

Genus of flies

Elephantomyia is a genus of crane fly in the family Limoniidae.

== Species ==
Subgenus Elephantomyia Osten Sacken, 1860

- E. adirondacensis Alexander, 1943
- E. alticola Alexander, 1925
- E. angustissima Alexander, 1931
- E. arcuaria Alexander, 1945
- E. argentipleura Alexander, 1970
- E. atropleura Alexander, 1955
- E. aurantiaca Alexander, 1917
- E. banksi Alexander, 1927
- E. barda Alexander, 1955
- †E. baltica Alexander, 1931
- †E. brevipalpa (Loew, 1850)
- E. boliviensis Alexander, 1930
- †E. bozenae Kania, 2015
- E. brunneipennis Alexander, 1938
- E. carbo Alexander, 1938
- E. ceratocheiloides Alexander, 1930
- E. chionopoda Alexander, 1943
- E. chiriquiana Alexander, 1945
- E. cinctiventris Alexander, 1967
- E. clitellaria Alexander, 1929
- E. corniculata Ribeiro & Souza Amorim, 2002
- E. curtirostris Alexander, 1947
- E. decincta Alexander, 1962
- E. dietziana Alexander, 1930
- E. dikopos Alexander, 1974
- E. distinctior Alexander, 1952
- E. edwardsi Lackschewitz, 1932
- E. filiform (Walker, 1865)
- E. flaveola Pierre, 1924
- E. flavicolor Alexander, 1958
- E. fumipes Alexander, 1928
- E. fuscodorsata Alexander, 1955
- E. garrigouana Alexander, 1951
- E. glabrata Alexander, 1956
- E. grahami Alexander, 1957
- E. hargreavesi Alexander, 1930
- E. hokkaidensis Alexander, 1924
- E. hoogstraaliana Alexander, 1951
- E. humilis Alexander, 1931
- E. inaequistyla Alexander, 1974
- E. insolita Alexander, 1940
- E. insularis Edwards, 1912
- E. inulta Alexander, 1938
- †E. irinae Kania, 2015
- E. isakana Alexander, 1955
- E. juquiensis Alexander, 1945
- E. krivosheinae Savchenko, 1976
- E. laetifica Alexander, 1960
- †E. longirostris (Loew, 1850)
- E. laticincta Alexander, 1971
- E. luculenta Alexander, 1928
- E. luteiannulata Alexander, 1939
- E. luteipennis Alexander, 1934
- E. maculistigma (Enderlein, 1912)
- E. meridionalis Alexander, 1913
- E. montana Alexander, 1934
- E. mossambica Alexander, 1960
- E. multisignata Alexander, 1965
- E. multizona Alexander, 1971
- E. neavei Alexander, 1920
- E. niphopoda Alexander, 1971
- E. nitidithorax Alexander, 1920
- E. niveipes Alexander, 1964
- E. orthorhabda Alexander, 1971
- E. ovalistigma Alexander, 1956
- E. palmata Alexander, 1947
- E. pauliani Alexander, 1959
- E. pendleburyi Edwards, 1928
- E. pertenuis Alexander, 1970
- E. pictithorax Alexander, 1930
- E. pictivena Alexander, 1961
- E. pictiventris Alexander, 1946
- E. pleurolineata Alexander, 1956
- E. primitiva Alexander, 1943
- E. primogenia Alexander, 1948
- E. pringlei Alexander, 1958
- E. pseudosimilis Alexander, 1921
- †E. pulchella (Loew, 1850)
- E. satura Alexander, 1956
- E. schwetzi Alexander, 1930
- E. scimitar Alexander, 1971
- E. serotina Alexander, 1930
- E. serrulifera Alexander, 1949
- E. setosa Alexander, 1956
- E. setulistyla Alexander, 1938
- E. sordidipes Alexander, 1962
- E. subhumilis Alexander, 1938
- E. subterminalis Alexander, 1954
- E. takachihoi Ito, 1948
- E. tarsalba Alexander, 1929
- E. tenuissima Alexander, 1944
- E. tetracantha Alexander, 1954
- E. tigriventris Alexander, 1942
- E. tomicola Alexander, 1957
- E. unicincta Alexander, 1962
- E. vesca Ribeiro & Souza Amorim, 2002
- E. wahlbergi Bergroth, 1888
- E. westwoodi Osten Sacken, 1869
- E. zonata Savchenko, 1976

Subgenus Elephantomyina Alexander, 1938

- E. supernumeraria Alexander, 1921

Subgenus Elephantomyodes Alexander, 1923

- E. affluens Alexander, 1949
- E. angusticellula Alexander, 1936
- E. argenteocincta (Walker, 1856)
- E. argyrophora Alexander, 1947
- E. aurantia Brunetti, 1918
- E. brachyrhyncha Alexander, 1947
- E. daedalus Alexander, 1947
- E. delectata (Walker, 1864)
- E. diligens Alexander, 1947
- E. egregia de Meijere, 1913
- E. fulvithorax Alexander, 1971
- E. fumicosta Alexander, 1922
- E. fuscomarginata Enderlein, 1912
- E. handschini Alexander, 1936
- E. hyalibasis Alexander, 1947
- E. infumosa Alexander, 1935
- E. mackerrasi Alexander, 1934
- E. major Alexander, 1923
- E. nana Alexander, 1951
- E. nigriceps Edwards, 1926
- E. nigriclava Edwards, 1933
- E. nigropedata Alexander, 1956
- E. percuneata Alexander, 1973
- E. ruapehuensis Alexander, 1923
- E. samarensis Alexander, 1925
- E. sophiarum Ito, 1948
- E. suffusa Alexander, 1971
- E. tasmaniensis Alexander, 1928
- E. tayloriana Alexander, 1935
- E. zealandica Edwards, 1923

Subgenus Xenoelephantomyia Alexander, 1965

- E. penai Alexander, 1965
