= Elephantomyia westwoodi =

Scientific classification
- Domain: Eukaryota
- Kingdom: Animalia
- Phylum: Arthropoda
- Class: Insecta
- Order: Diptera
- Family: Limoniidae
- Genus: Elephantomyia
- Species: E. westwoodi

Binomial name
- Elephantomyia westwoodi Osten Sacken, 1869

Synonyms
- Elephantomyia adirondacensis Alexander, 1942

Species of fly

Elephantomyia westwoodi is a species of limoniid crane fly in the family Limoniidae.

== Subspecies ==
These three subspecies belong to the species Elephantomyia westwoodi:

- Elephantomyia westwoodi adirondacensis Alexander
- Elephantomyia westwoodi antillarum Alexander, 1933
- Elephantomyia westwoodi westwoodi
