= National Information Processing Institute =

Polish government research institute

National Information Processing Institute (OPI PIB)
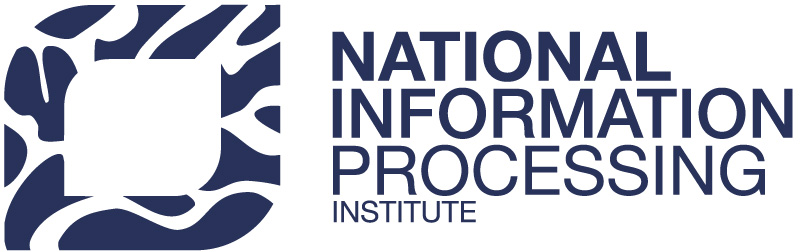

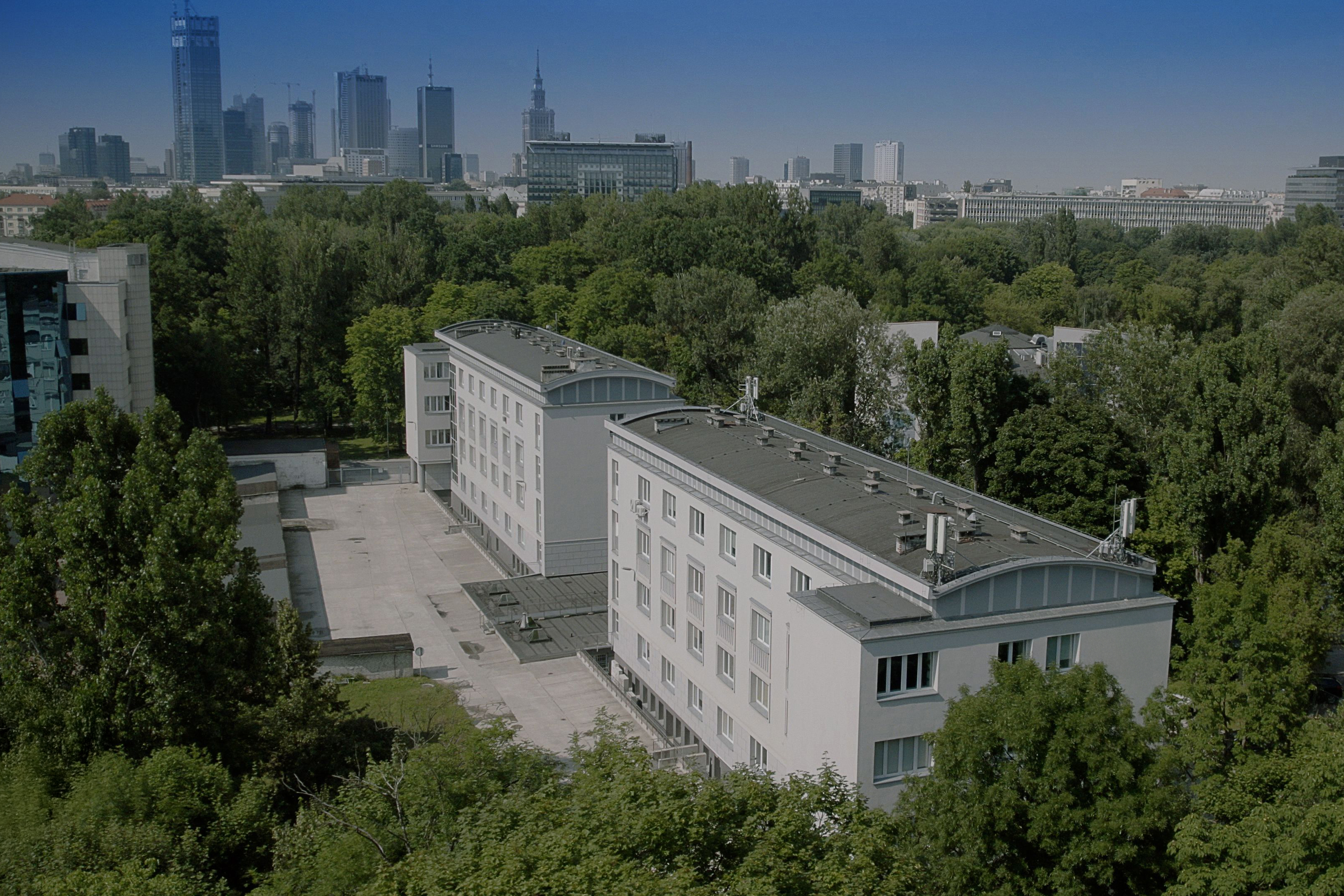

Agency overview
- Formed: 13 December 1990
- Headquarters: al. Niepodległości 188 B, Warsaw
- Agency executive: Jarosław Protasiewicz, Director
- Website: https://opi.org.pl

National Information Processing Institute (OPI PIB) is a modern centre for information technology, artificial intelligence, and data analysis based in Warsaw, Poland. The institute supports the implementation of Polish government policy in science and higher education, and contributes to the construction of an innovative, knowledge-based economy.

== Scope of Activities ==
OPI PIB supports the development of Polish science and higher education by providing advanced digital tools, conducting reliable research and analysis, and fostering the development of research infrastructure. The Institute’s experts conduct research technical IT and communication, as well as in social sciences.

OPI PIB develops modern software primarily for the science and higher education sector. Integrating technology with the data that the institute processes enables more effective management of the sector and helps align education offerings with labour market demand and student expectations.

OPI PIB also creates innovative solutions using artificial intelligence and is actively involved in the development of digital medicine. It is one of the leading centres in the development of cutting-edge AI-based solutions. Its tools are recognised not only in Poland, but also in other EU member states.

The Institute’s experts prepare comprehensive reports and analyses in business analytics, the sociology of science, and scientometrics. These reports are characterised by the reliability and completeness of their data. This makes them valuable tools in the implementation of evidence-based higher education policy.

Researchers at OPI PIB also conduct advanced studies on human–computer interaction (HCI). Their findings are essential in the creation of more intuitive, accessible, and user-centered technologies. HCI studies contribute to greater efficiency, comfort, and user satisfaction in interactions with digital systems.

The OPI PIB provides online education and training in e-learning. It offers massive open online courses (MOOCs) in various disciplines and provides training in online course design and methodology.

OPI PIB also manages the distribution of European Union funds that are dedicated to the development of research infrastructure in the science sector. The institute organises funding competitions, signs funding agreements, settles and monitors projects, identifies irregularities, and conducts evaluations.

== History ==
On December 13, 1990, a research and development unit called the National Information Processing Institute was established. It was created as a successor to the Centre for Scientific, Technical and Economic Information (CINTE), based on Directive No. 12 of the Minister – Head of the Office for Scientific and Technical Progress and Implementation.

On October 23, 2013, the Council of Ministers granted the Institute the status of a national research institute.

The Institute is headquartered in Warsaw in two buildings located at 188B and 186 Niepodległości Avenue. These buildings have an interesting history—after World War II, they housed, among others, the Central Board of the Building Materials Industry.

Between 1980 and 1990, the buildings were home to the Centre for Scientific, Technical and Economic Information (CINTE), a research and development center whose work encompassed the full spectrum of scientific information topics—from theoretical issues to practical applications of information technologies. CINTE also published several materials, including the "Polish Science Information Bulletin."

== Directors ==
- Jarosław Protasiewicz – Director (since 2019)
- Olaf Gajl – Director (2007–2019)
- Dorota Maciejko – Acting Director (2005–2007)
- Olaf Gajl – Director (2004–2005)
- Paweł Gierycz – Director (1998–2004)
- Wacław Wasiak – Director (1991–1997)
- Adam Kapica – Head of the Institute (1990–1991)
