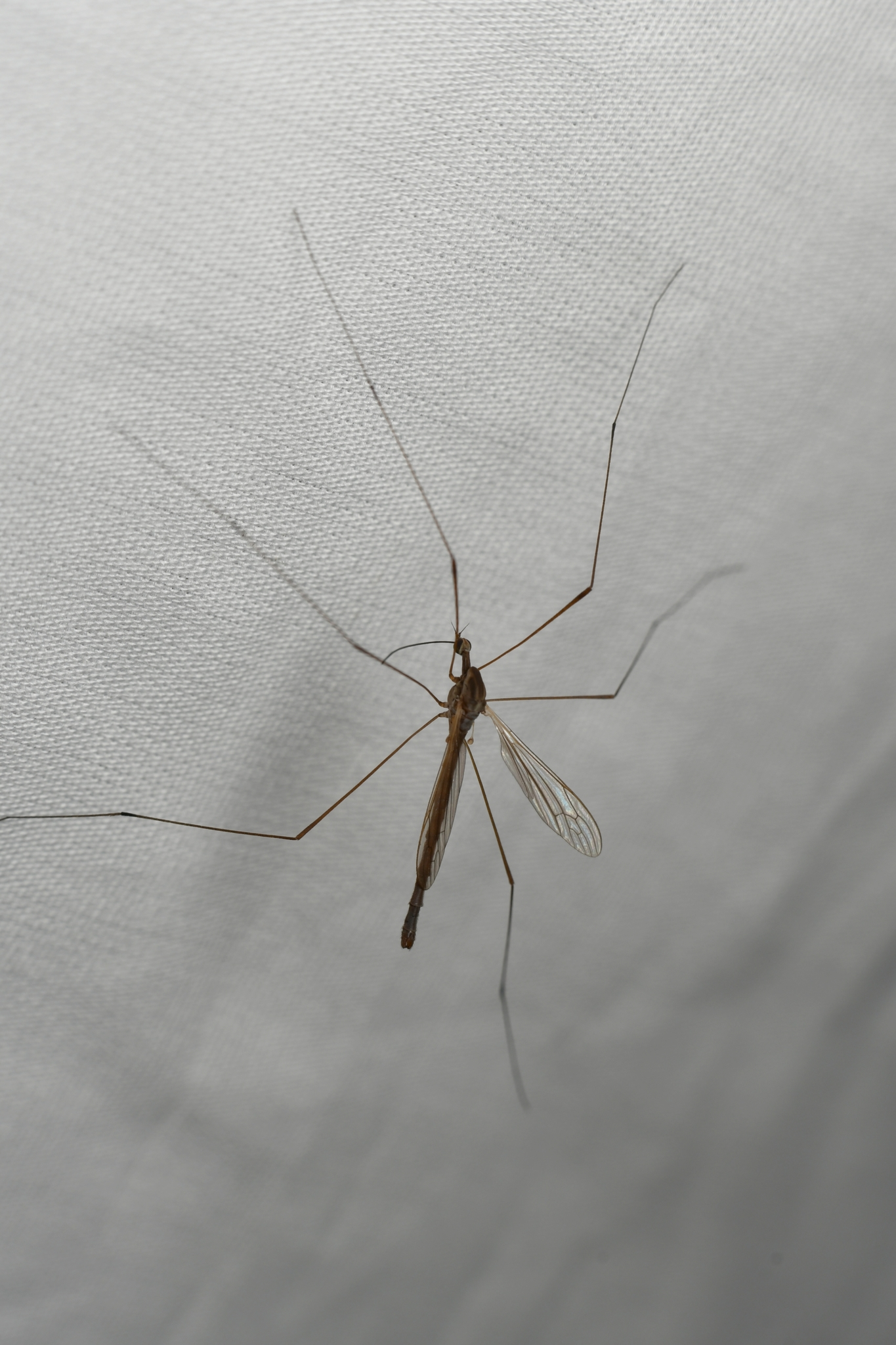
- Toxorhina magna, Florida
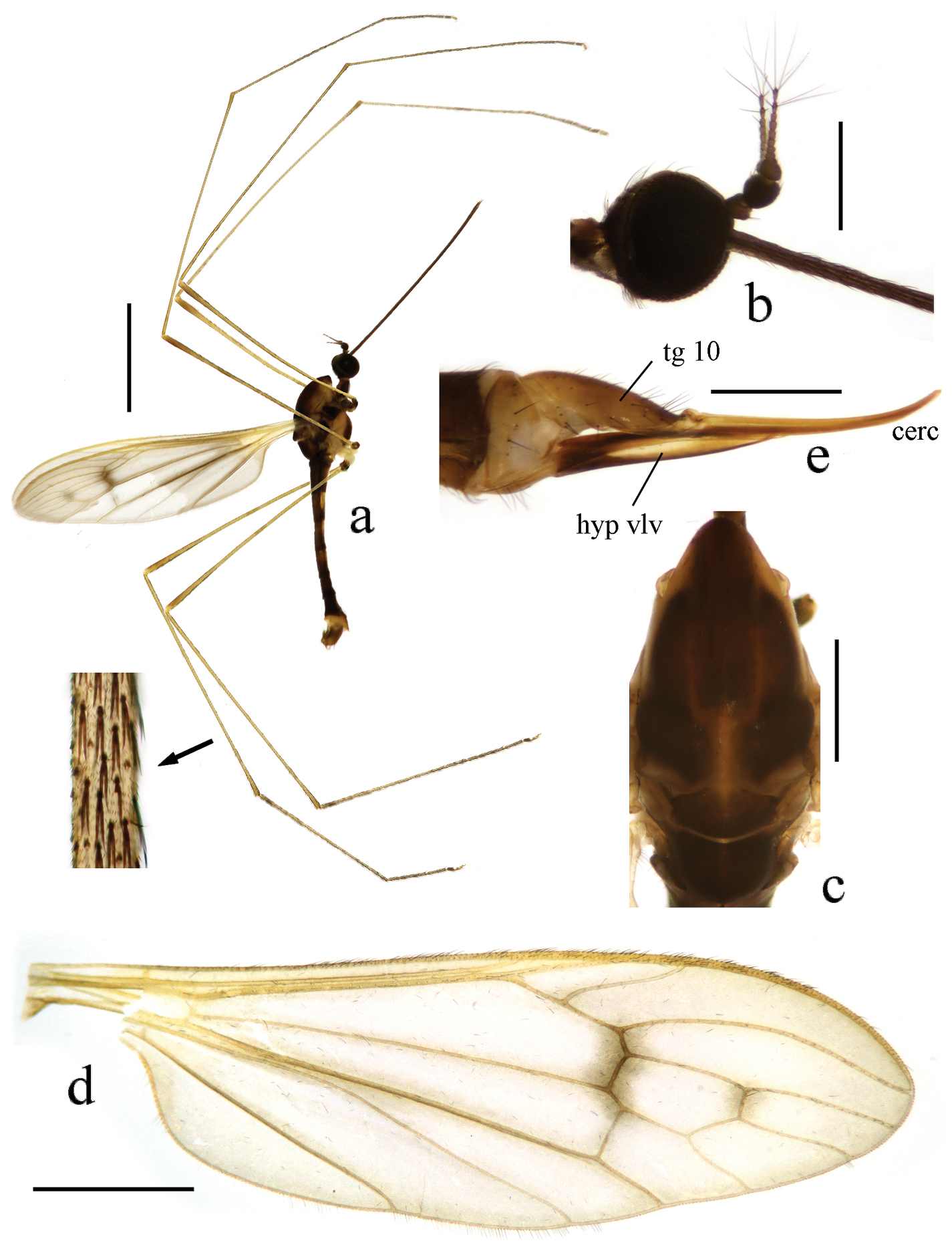
- Toxorhina fuscolimbata

Scientific classification
- Kingdom: Animalia
- Phylum: Arthropoda
- Clade: Pancrustacea
- Class: Insecta
- Order: Diptera
- Family: Limoniidae
- Subfamily: Chioneinae
- Tribe: Eriopterini
- Genus: Toxorhina; Loew, 1850

Type species
- Toxorhina fragilis Loew, 1851

Synonyms
- Taxorrhina Loew, 1850; Toxorrhina Loew, 1850; Neoceratocheilus Wesche, 1910

= Toxorhina =

Genus of flies

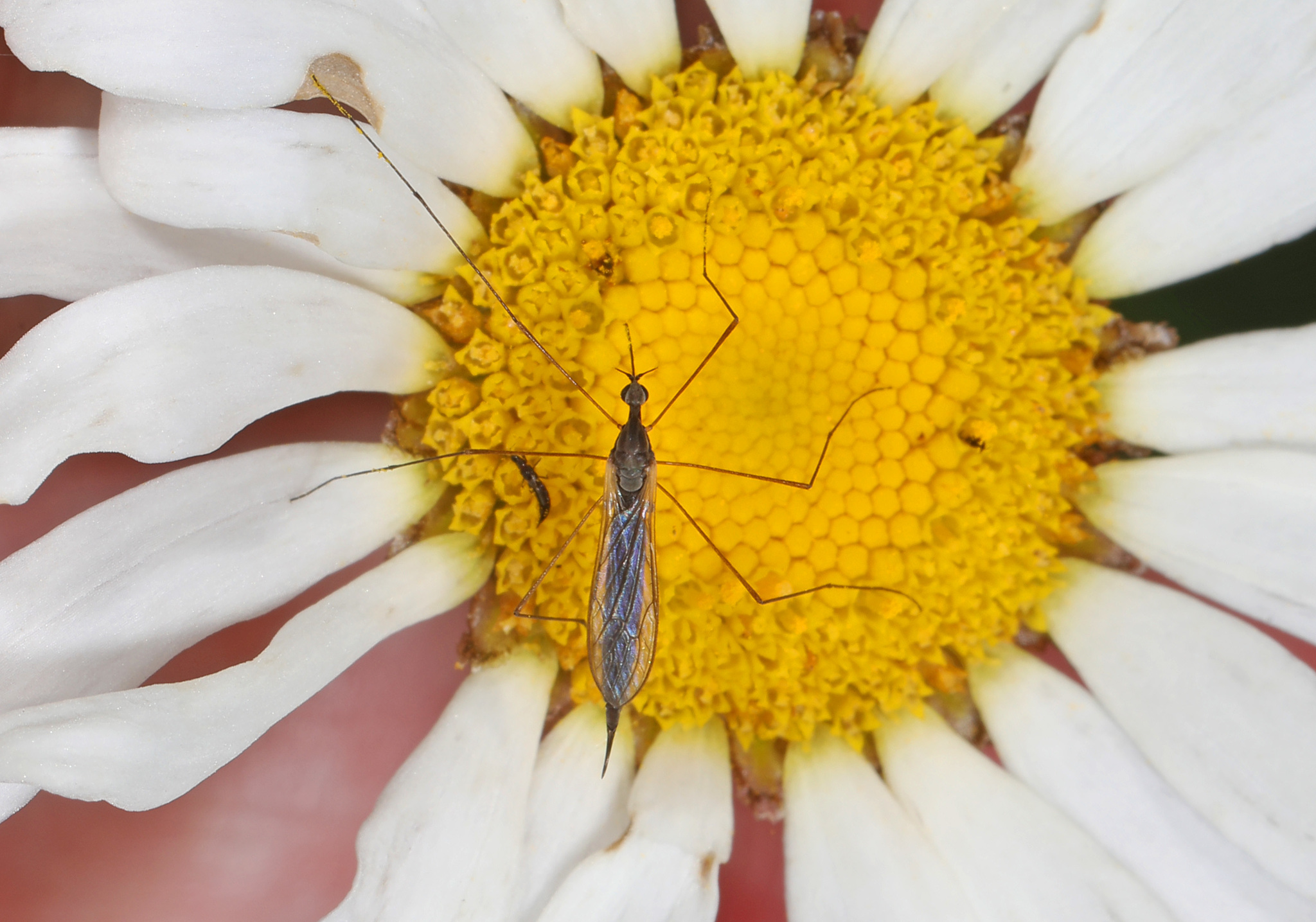
Toxorhina muliebris feeding on a flower in Maryland

Toxorhina is a genus of crane fly belonging to the family Limoniidae. They can be found in various places such as the United States (Florida and Maryland) and China.

It can be distinguished among other crane flies by the reduced number of veins in the wings, among other less apparent differences. They are often recorded feeding in flowers.

== Species ==
There are more than 150 species belonging to this genus belonging to three subgenera. There have been several fossil species discovered belonging to this genus. They are Toxorhina eridanus, Toxorhina caucasiensis, Toxorhina mexicana and Toxorhina madagascariensis.

These species belong to the genus Toxorhina:

Subgenus Ceratocheilus Wesche, 1910
Toxorhina alexanderi Tjeder, 1981
Toxorhina approximata Alexander, 1951
Toxorhina atritarsis Alexander, 1943
Toxorhina australasiae (Alexander, 1922)
Toxorhina biroi Alexander, 1934
Toxorhina bispinosa Alexander, 1965
Toxorhina bistyla Alexander, 1967
Toxorhina brachymera Alexander, 1956
Toxorhina brevifrons (Brunetti, 1918)
Toxorhina brevisector Alexander, 1974
Toxorhina caledonica Alexander, 1948
Toxorhina capnitis Alexander, 1956
Toxorhina caucasiensis
Toxorhina chiapasensis Alexander, 1938
Toxorhina claripennis Alexander, 1958
Toxorhina cocottensis Alexander, 1956
Toxorhina contractifrons (Edwards, 1933)
Toxorhina cornigera (Speiser, 1908)
Toxorhina christelius
Toxorhina danieleae Alexander, 1979
Toxorhina drysdalei Alexander, 1937
Toxorhina edwardsi (Alexander, 1920)
Toxorhina eridanus
Toxorhina flavicostata Alexander, 1954
Toxorhina flavirostris (Alexander, 1920)
Toxorhina formosensis (Alexander, 1928)
Toxorhina fulvicolor Alexander, 1967
Toxorhina fumipennis Alexander, 1936
Toxorhina fuscolimbata Alexander, 1967
Toxorhina gilesi (Edwards, 1911)
Toxorhina gressitti Alexander, 1962
Toxorhina growea Theischinger, 1994
Toxorhina holvia Boardman, 2020
Toxorhina hoogstraali Alexander, 1948
Toxorhina huanglica Zhang, Li & Yang, 2015
Toxorhina imperatrix Alexander, 1948
Toxorhina infuscula Alexander, 1962
Toxorhina inobsepta Alexander, 1978
Toxorhina juvenca Alexander, 1948
Toxorhina kokodae Alexander, 1951
Toxorhina latifrons (Brunetti, 1918)
Toxorhina leucomelanopus (Enderlein, 1912)
Toxorhina leucostena Alexander, 1937
Toxorhina levis (Hutton, 1900)
Toxorhina luteibasis Alexander, 1962
Toxorhina lyrata Alexander, 1972
Toxorhina macrorhyncha Alexander, 1955
Toxorhina maculipennis Alexander, 1936
Toxorhina madagascariensis
Toxorhina majus (Edwards, 1926)
Toxorhina melanomera Alexander, 1962
Toxorhina mesorhyncha Alexander, 1936
Toxorhina mexicana
Toxorhina monostyla Alexander, 1962
Toxorhina nasus Theischinger, 1994
Toxorhina nigripleura (Alexander, 1920)
Toxorhina nigropolita Alexander, 1956
Toxorhina nimbipleura Alexander, 1963
Toxorhina niveitarsis (Alexander, 1922)
Toxorhina nympha Alexander, 1961
Toxorhina ochracea (Edwards, 1923)
Toxorhina omnifusca Zhang, Li & Yang, 2015
Toxorhina phaeoneura Alexander, 1960
Toxorhina pianmica Xu, Lv & Zhang, 2024
Toxorhina pictipennis Alexander, 1972
Toxorhina pollex Alexander, 1956
Toxorhina prolongata Alexander, 1938
Toxorhina revulsa Alexander, 1955
Toxorhina romblonensis Alexander, 1929
Toxorhina scimitar Alexander, 1956
Toxorhina seychellarum (Edwards, 1912)
Toxorhina simplicistyla Alexander, 1967
Toxorhina streptotrichia Alexander, 1962
Toxorhina superstes Alexander, 1942
Toxorhina taiwanicola (Alexander, 1923)
Toxorhina tasmaniensis (Alexander, 1926)
Toxorhina tenebrica Alexander, 1961
Toxorhina tinctipennis (Alexander, 1930)
Toxorhina toxopeana Alexander, 1961
Toxorhina trichopyga Alexander, 1962
Toxorhina tuberifera Alexander, 1966
Toxorhina univirgata Zhang, Li & Yang, 2015
Toxorhina vulsa Alexander, 1952
Toxorhina westralis Theischinger, 1994
Toxorhina yamma Theischinger, 2000
Subgenus Eutoxorhina Alexander, 1934
Toxorhina ammoula Theischinger, 1994
Toxorhina parasimplex Hynes, 1988
Toxorhina simplex Alexander, 1934
Subgenus Toxorhina Loew, 1850
Toxorhina acanthobasis Alexander, 1960
Toxorhina acutapex Alexander, 1972
Toxorhina angustilinea Alexander, 1930
Toxorhina atripes Alexander, 1922
Toxorhina basalis Alexander, 1951
Toxorhina basiseta Alexander, 1978
Toxorhina biceps Alexander, 1931
Toxorhina brevirama Alexander, 1953
Toxorhina brevistyla Alexander, 1965
Toxorhina brunniventris Edwards, 1931
Toxorhina carunculata Alexander, 1970
Toxorhina centralis (Alexander, 1913)
Toxorhina cisatlantica Speiser, 1908
Toxorhina curtipennis Alexander, 1975
Toxorhina curvata Alexander, 1938
Toxorhina cuthbertsoni Alexander, 1937
Toxorhina dendroidea Alexander, 1931
Toxorhina digitifera Alexander, 1964
Toxorhina distalis Alexander, 1936
Toxorhina domingensis Alexander, 1937
Toxorhina duyagi Alexander, 1930
Toxorhina fasciata Edwards, 1926
Toxorhina flavida (Alexander, 1913)
Toxorhina fragilis Loew, 1851
Toxorhina grahami (Wesche, 1910)
Toxorhina grossa Alexander, 1956
Toxorhina incerta Brunetti, 1912
Toxorhina infumata Edwards, 1928
Toxorhina infumipennis Alexander, 1942
Toxorhina jamaicensis Alexander, 1964
Toxorhina latamera Alexander, 1968
Toxorhina longicollis Pierre, 1924
Toxorhina magna Osten Sacken, 1865
Toxorhina mashona Alexander, 1959
Toxorhina megatricha Alexander, 1961
Toxorhina mendosa Alexander, 1935
Toxorhina meridionalis (Alexander, 1913)
Toxorhina montina Alexander, 1931
Toxorhina muliebris Osten Sacken, 1865
Toxorhina nigrivena Alexander, 1939
Toxorhina noeliana Alexander, 1956
Toxorhina occlusa Edwards, 1928
Toxorhina ochreata Edwards, 1931
Toxorhina pergracilis Alexander, 1944
Toxorhina perproducta Alexander, 1956
Toxorhina phoracaena Alexander, 1966
Toxorhina polycantha Alexander, 1940
Toxorhina polytricha Alexander, 1970
Toxorhina producta Edwards, 1928
Toxorhina protrusa Alexander, 1962
Toxorhina pulvinaria Alexander, 1950
Toxorhina scapania Alexander, 1966
Toxorhina scita Alexander, 1962
Toxorhina serpens Alexander, 1951
Toxorhina sparsiseta Alexander, 1962
Toxorhina staplesi Alexander, 1973
Toxorhina stenomera Alexander, 1972
Toxorhina stenophallus Alexander, 1937
Toxorhina subfragilis Alexander, 1970
Toxorhina suttoni Alexander, 1936
Toxorhina taeniomera Alexander, 1950
Toxorhina tonkouiana Alexander, 1958
Toxorhina trichorhyncha Edwards, 1926
Toxorhina trilineata Alexander, 1936
Toxorhina trilobata Alexander, 1938
Toxorhina tuberculata Alexander, 1931
Toxorhina violaceipennis Alexander, 1937
Toxorhina westwoodi Brunetti, 1920
Subgenus not assigned
Toxorhina spinulifera
