= Comstock–Needham system =

Naming system for insect wing veins

The Comstock–Needham system is a naming system for insect wing veins, devised by John Comstock and George Needham in 1898. It was an important step in showing the homology of all insect wings. This system was based on Needham's pretracheation theory that was later discredited by Frederic Charles Fraser in 1938.

== Vein terminology ==
=== Longitudinal veins ===
Insect wing venation, showing the names after the Comstock–Needham system

The Comstock and Needham system attributes different names to the veins on an insect's wing. From the anterior (leading) edge of the wing towards the posterior (rear), the major longitudinal veins are named:

- costa C, meaning rib
- subcosta Sc, meaning below the rib
- radius R, in analogy with a bone in the forearm, the radius
- media M, meaning middle
- cubitus Cu, meaning elbow
- anal veins A, in reference to its posterior location

Apart from the costal and the anal veins, each vein can be branched, in which case the branches are numbered from anterior to posterior. For example, the two branches of the subcostal vein will be called Sc_{1} and Sc_{2}.

The radius typically branches once near the base, producing anteriorly the R_{1} and posteriorly the radial sector Rs. The radial sector may fork twice.

The media may also fork twice, therefore having four branches reaching the wing margin.

According to the Comstock–Needham system, the cubitus forks once, producing the cubital veins Cu_{1} and Cu_{2}. According to some other authorities, Cu_{1} may fork again, producing the Cu_{1a} and Cu_{1b}.

As there are several anal veins, they are called A1, A2, and so on. They are usually unforked.

=== Crossveins ===
Crossveins link the longitudinal veins, and are named accordingly (for example, the medio-cubital crossvein is termed m-cu). Some crossveins have their own name, like the humeral crossvein h and the sectoral crossvein s.

== Cell terminology ==
The cells are named after the vein on the anterior side; for instance, the cell between Sc_{2} and R_{1} is called Sc_{2}.

In the case where two cells are separated by a crossvein but have the same anterior longitudinal vein, they should have the same name. To avoid this, they are attributed a number. For example, the R_{1} cell is divided in two by the radial cross vein: the basal cell is termed "first R_{1}", and the distal cell "second R_{1}".

If a cell is bordered anteriorly by a forking vein, such as R_{2} and R_{3}, the cell is named after the posterior vein, in this case R_{3}.
