= University of Rzeszów =

Public university in Rzeszów, Poland

Coordinates: 50°1′48″N 22°0′56″E

- Uniwersytet Rzeszowski
- Seal of the university
- Latin: Universitas Resoviensis
- Type: Public research university
- Established: 1 September 2001
- Rector: Adam Reich
- Students: Approximately 19,000 (2026–27)
- Location: Rzeszów, Poland
- Campus: Urban
- Colors: Blue and white
- Website: www.ur.edu.pl/en/home

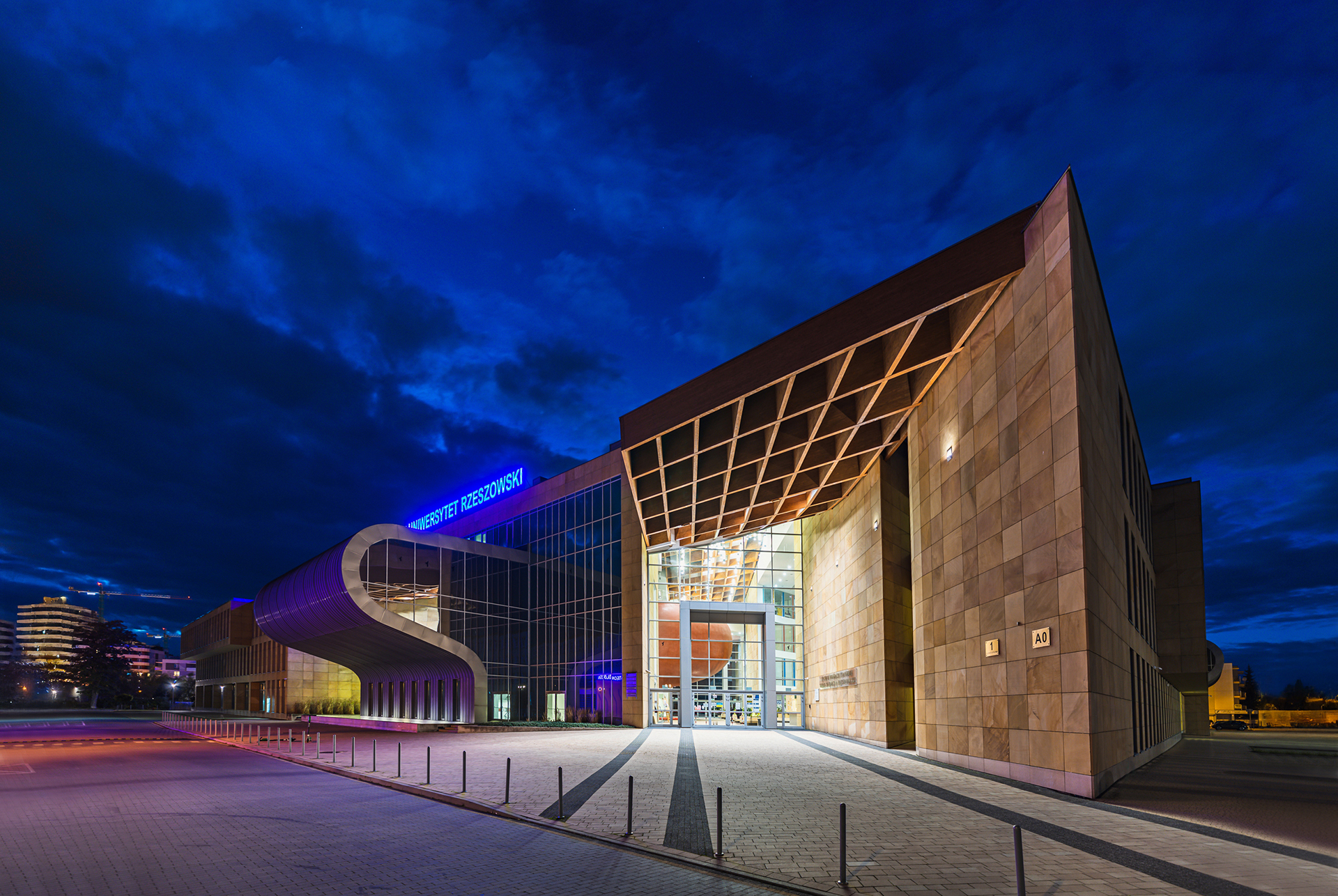
Main academic building (A0) of the University of Rzeszów

The University of Rzeszów (Polish: Uniwersytet Rzeszowski; Latin: Universitas Resoviensis) is a public university in Rzeszów, southeastern Poland. Established in 2001 through the merger of three higher-education institutions, it enrolled approximately 19,000 students in the 2026–27 academic year across 15 faculties.

The university offers degrees in medicine, the natural sciences, engineering, law, economics, the humanities and the arts. Its Collegium Medicum, established to coordinate medical and health-sciences education, works with the university-owned Fryderyk Chopin University Clinical Hospital and other clinical teaching sites. The university and its hospital are developing a new clinical campus in Świlcza, beginning with a government-funded oncology centre.

University archaeologists led by Sylwester Czopek have investigated the Scythian-period fortified settlement at Chotyniec, including the discovery of an early sixth-century BC Greek amphora. Other research includes biochemistry, molecular oncology, ethnobotany and semiconductor physics. Notable graduates include European athletics champion Anna Wielgosz, WBC boxing champion Łukasz Różański, singer-songwriter Kortez and Eurocorps Chief of Staff Zenon Brzuszko.

== History ==
=== Origins and establishment ===
The University of Rzeszów was formed through the consolidation of several institutions whose histories predated the university itself. Teacher training in Rzeszów developed from a local centre of the Kraków-based pedagogical college in 1963, becoming an independent Higher School of Pedagogy in 1965. The agricultural faculty of the Kraków institution began operating in Rzeszów in 1973. A Rzeszów branch of Maria Curie-Skłodowska University followed in 1969. They taught education, humanities, social sciences, economics and the natural sciences.

Under the 7 June 2001 act of the Polish parliament, the new institution was created effective 1 September 2001. The law formally combined the three existing higher-education bodies and transferred their academic and administrative responsibilities to the university. The new university combined their teaching and research activities.

The university's first rector was physicist Tadeusz Lulek (2001–2002), followed by historian Włodzimierz Bonusiak (2002–2008), literary scholar Stanisław Uliasz (2008–2012), philosopher and politician Aleksander Bobko (2012–2015), archaeologist Sylwester Czopek (2015–2024), and physician Adam Reich (since September 2024).

=== Development of the medical school ===
Medical and health-related programmes developed gradually from the educational institutions that preceded the present university. Physiotherapy became an important component of its early health-sciences provision; nursing and midwifery programmes were subsequently established in the 2000s. The Faculty of Medicine developed from these programmes, and medical-degree education began in 2015. Subsequent reorganisations brought medical education, biotechnology, health sciences, psychology and physical culture sciences together within a Medical College.

In January 2023, an agreement transferred the governance of the Fryderyk Chopin Clinical Hospital from the regional authorities to the university. The institution subsequently operated as the Fryderyk Chopin University Clinical Hospital, providing a base for clinical teaching and research. The Medical College comprises four faculties under the university's current academic structure.

== Campuses ==
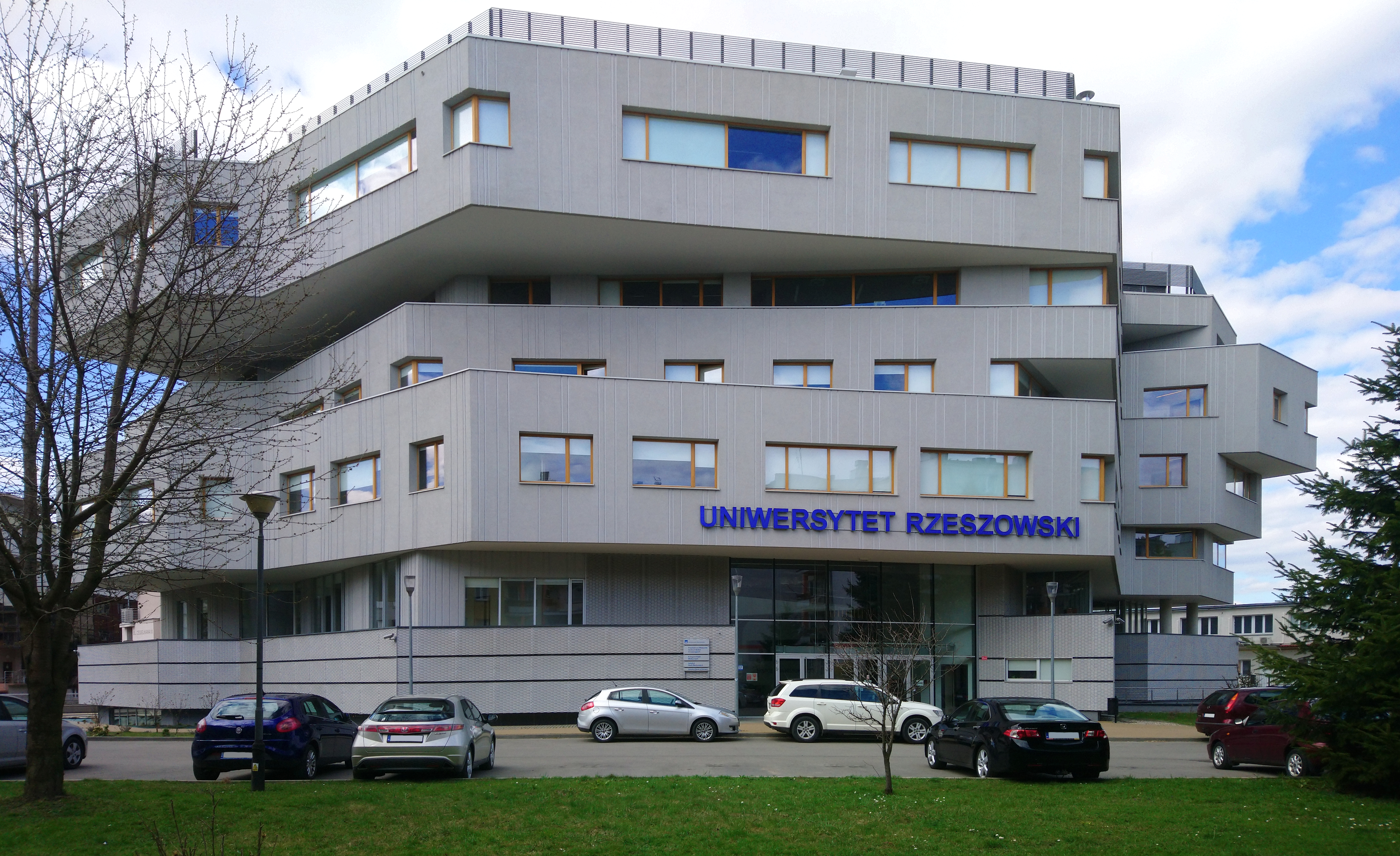
Building of the university's Medical College

The university occupies several sites across Rzeszów. Its administration is based at 16C Rejtana Avenue. Academic buildings are located on Rejtana Avenue and Pigonia Street, with medical laboratories on Warzywna Street and sports facilities on Cicha Street. The university library and halls of residence are also located within the city.

=== University library ===
University of Rzeszów Library

The University of Rzeszów Library (Biblioteka Uniwersytetu Rzeszowskiego) brings together collections originating in the libraries of the university's predecessor institutions. Its institutional history extends to the pedagogical college established in Rzeszów in the 1960s. It was consolidated as a university-wide library following the 2001 merger and moved into a purpose-built building in 2004, now addressed as ul. prof. Stanisława Pigonia 8. The library maintains printed and digital collections, specialist reading rooms, electronic databases and an online catalogue. Its special collections include historic prints, manuscripts, maps and materials on the history of Galicia, alongside a specialist music collection.

=== Medical and scientific facilities ===
The university’s medical facilities include the Fryderyk Chopin University Clinical Hospital, a medical simulation centre opened in 2020, and laboratories for imaging, rehabilitation, and preclinical and clinical research.

The Natural and Medical Centre for Innovative Research (Przyrodniczo-Medyczne Centrum Badań Innowacyjnych) was developed as an interdisciplinary group of experimental laboratories for medicine, biotechnology, rehabilitation and related sciences. It has laboratories in clinical neurophysiology, imaging, pharmacology, molecular biology and research on the central nervous system and spine.

== Medical and campus development ==
=== University clinical hospital and proposed Świlcza campus ===
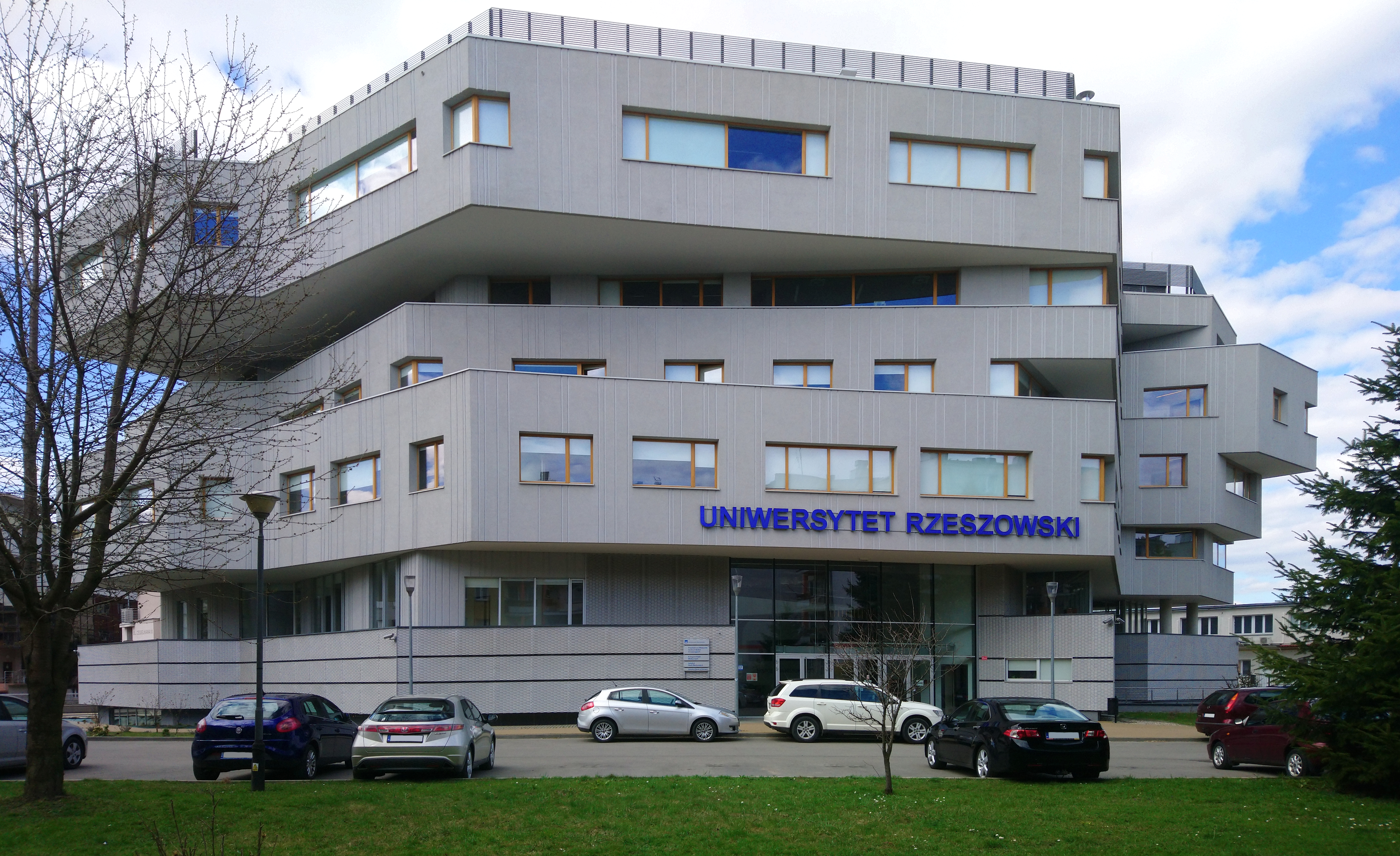
A Medical College building in Rzeszów

The Fryderyk Chopin University Clinical Hospital became the university's clinical hospital in January 2023, following the transfer of its governing responsibility from the Subcarpathian regional government. The university subsequently began preparations for a new hospital campus in Świlcza, west of Rzeszów. In 2022, a proposal for the wider 35-hectare complex carried an indicative total cost of approximately PLN 2 billion. This was an initial project estimate.

The first funded phase is an oncology clinic. A Council of Ministers resolution of 2 February 2026 established an investment programme of PLN 299,859,144 from the Medical Fund for 2026–2029. The planned clinic includes inpatient oncology services, day chemotherapy, specialist outpatient services and diagnostic and pharmacy facilities. On 9 July 2026 the hospital signed a contract for preparation of tender documentation. As of late October 2026, construction had not yet started; a tender was expected in November, with work projected to begin in spring 2027. The oncology phase forms part of the 2026–2029 investment programme.

The hospital and university have also proposed a later phase for operating theatres, surgical clinics and diagnostic services. In July 2026 they reported submitting an application for more than PLN 1 billion for this development; that funding had not been confirmed. The overall financing and final cost of the full hospital campus had not been determined as of November 2026.

=== Medical College teaching buildings ===
The university began expanding its medical simulation centre on Warszawska Street in September 2025, adding practical examination rooms and simulated pre-hospital emergency-care facilities. Contemporary reporting estimated the expansion and modernisation at approximately PLN 12 million, within a broader programme of medical-teaching investments funded through the Polish National Recovery Plan. The originally announced completion target was August 2026.

A separate approximately 4,000-square-metre preclinical teaching building on Cicha Street was contracted in October 2025 for PLN 49.42 million, including approximately PLN 40.18 million in recovery-plan funding. The building is planned to contain lecture halls, teaching laboratories and practical-learning areas. Its original delivery target was late 2026.

=== Regional teaching hospitals and associated developments ===
The Medical College also provides clinical education at the separately administered St Jadwiga Queen Provincial Clinical Hospital (Kliniczny Szpital Wojewódzki im. Św. Jadwigi Królowej) on Lwowska Street. Cooperation in medical teaching and research predates the establishment of the university-owned Fryderyk Chopin hospital. These are distinct institutions with different governing bodies and investment budgets.

In June 2026, St Jadwiga Hospital signed a construction contract for the Podkarpackie Centre for Children's Medicine (Podkarpackie Centrum Medycyny Dziecięcej). The overall investment was valued at approximately PLN 763 million, including a construction contract of about PLN 643 million and subsequent medical equipment. The planned 34,000-square-metre centre provides for 195 beds and day-care or intensive-care places, a paediatric emergency department and specialist outpatient clinics. Its stated opening target is October 2029. The regional government administers the project separately from the University of Rzeszów.

The same provincial hospital has pursued a Podkarpackie Centre for Heart Diseases project (Podkarpackie Centrum Chorób Serca). The regional government's 2025 budget documentation listed an estimated PLN 56 million for a programme scheduled for 2024–2027 and recorded design and cost documentation as being prepared. Subsequent reporting in 2026 described continued planning and financing discussions, rather than a completed centre; no updated final contract price had been reported. The Podkarpackie Centre for Heart Diseases programme at St Jadwiga Hospital is distinct from a similarly named cardiology development at the Interior Ministry's (MSWiA) hospital in Rzeszów.

== Organization and administration ==
The university is governed by its rector, university senate and statutory academic bodies. Adam Reich, a professor of medicine and specialist in dermatology, became rector on 1 September 2024 for the 2024–2028 term.

=== Faculties ===
Following the reorganisation of its academic structure in January 2025, the university has 15 faculties. Four are grouped in its Medical College (Collegium Medicum):

- Faculty of Medicine
- Faculty of Biotechnology
- Faculty of Health Sciences and Psychology
- Faculty of Physical Culture Sciences
- Faculty of Biology, Nature Protection and Sustainable Development
- Faculty of Economics and Finance
- Faculty of Education and Philosophy
- Faculty of Exact and Technical Sciences
- Faculty of Fine Arts
- Faculty of Humanities
- Faculty of Law and Administration
- Faculty of Music
- Faculty of Philology
- Faculty of Social Sciences
- Faculty of Technology and Life Sciences

The university also operates a doctoral school and interdisciplinary research centres.

== Academics ==
University academic buildings in Rzeszów

=== Teaching and degrees ===
The university offers undergraduate and postgraduate study, integrated master's programmes, doctoral training and postgraduate professional education. Disciplines taught include medicine, nursing, physiotherapy, biotechnology, mathematics, information technology, chemistry, biology, archaeology, law, economics, languages, music and the visual arts. Degree programmes in medicine, physiotherapy and selected non-medical fields have also been offered in English.

=== Archaeology and the Scythian settlement at Chotyniec ===
Sylwester Czopek and researchers at the university's Institute of Archaeology have investigated the fortified settlement at Chotyniec in southeastern Poland. Excavations undertaken from 2016 brought to light a hillfort and associated settlements belonging to the forest-steppe variant of the Scythian cultural sphere. Researchers also identified a ritual deposit, or zolnik, containing ceramics, metal artefacts and fragments of Greek amphorae.

The best-known find was a nearly complete Greek wine amphora dated to the early sixth century BC, identified in an interdisciplinary study as the first known artefact of its type found within Poland's modern borders. The Chotyniec project subsequently received funding from the Polish National Science Centre and produced a series of excavation reports and specialist archaeological analyses.

The university's Institute of Archaeology originated in the Higher School of Pedagogy in 1999. It was developed by scholars including Jan Machnik, Michał Parczewski and Sylwester Czopek. Research includes Central European prehistory, the Carpathian borderlands, Bronze and Iron Age societies, early medieval settlement, and archaeological evidence for contacts across the eastern European frontier. The institute also maintains a digital archaeology and source-research laboratory.

The results from Chotyniec have been published in the multi-volume Raport chotyniecki (Chotyniec Report), encompassing excavation records, archaeozoological and archaeometric studies, material culture and the site's fortifications. The publication received a distinction at the 2025 Academia competition for academic books.

=== Medicine, neurophysiology and rehabilitation ===
Medical education and research are conducted by the Collegium Medicum, the university's clinical hospital, and specialist facilities in the Natural and Medical Centre for Innovative Research. Its laboratories support clinical physiology, genetics, rehabilitation and biotechnology.

One clinical neurophysiology laboratory investigates neurological recovery and brain electrical activity using electroencephalography and evoked potential recordings, including studies related to cranial decompression and cranioplasty. The centre also supports research in rehabilitation and clinical measurement.

Other laboratories support magnetic resonance imaging, molecular and genetic studies, and rehabilitation research. The Fryderyk Chopin University Clinical Hospital provides the university's principal setting for clinical teaching and patient care.

=== Clinical medicine and haematopoietic-cell transplantation ===
The university-owned Fryderyk Chopin University Clinical Hospital provides specialist services in oncology, haematology, surgery, psychiatry and other clinical disciplines. Its haematology clinic is authorised by the Polish transplant authority to collect and transplant hematopoietic stem cells using autologous and allogeneic grafts, including from bone marrow, peripheral blood and umbilical cord blood. It also provides diagnostic testing in flow cytometry and cytogenetics.

=== Biomedical and oncological research ===
In 2026, researchers from the Medical College's Faculty of Biotechnology and collaborators at the Medical University of Lublin, the University of Warsaw and the Polish Academy of Sciences reported a biomimetic albumin-based delivery system combining tanespimycin, dasatinib and quercetin for experimental treatment of triple-negative breast cancer. The formulation was evaluated in cancer-cell lines and zebrafish xenograft models; the work was preclinical and did not establish effectiveness in human patients.

A separate joint project with Rzeszów University of Technology produced a patented experimental apparatus for studying prostate tissue ex vivo (Polish patent 249805). Its proposed diagnostic applications remain the subject of research rather than established clinical practice.

=== Microelectronics, nanotechnology and natural sciences ===
The university's Centre for Microelectronics and Nanotechnology contains laboratories for the preparation and analysis of semiconductor and nanoscale structures. These include facilities for molecular-beam epitaxy, photolithography, electron-beam lithography, low-temperature luminescence and magnetotransport measurements. The centre supports teaching and experimental work in semiconductor physics, materials science and related fields.

Experimental research also takes place in biology, biotechnology, and materials and technical sciences, supported by the university’s technology-transfer centre.

=== Ethnobotany, biology and environmental research ===
Biologist Łukasz Łuczaj researches ethnobotany and traditional ecological knowledge, particularly the use of wild edible and medicinal plants. His published fieldwork covers Europe and Asia.

Biochemist Grzegorz Bartosz, a corresponding member of the Polish Academy of Sciences, has investigated reactive oxygen species, free-radical biology and the biochemistry of ageing. He served as president of the Society for Free Radical Research–Europe in 2011–2012. Research in the technology and life sciences faculty includes food production, biotechnology and environmental processes.

=== Humanities, social sciences and fine arts ===
The humanities and social sciences faculties cover history, philosophy, linguistics, literature, law and economics. Historical research includes the Central European borderlands and digital methods for working with documentary sources.

The historian Paweł Grata has led research on the economic and social modernisation of Poland, including the history of Polish social policy in the nineteenth and twentieth centuries. The university has supported multi-year historical projects and the publication of academic monographs and source collections on modernisation and welfare policy.

The university’s Faculty of Fine Arts and Faculty of Music provide degree courses and support artistic practice, exhibitions, performances and scholarly publication.

=== Research funding and knowledge transfer ===
The university's technology-transfer centre manages applied research and invention disclosures. Its commercialisation activities include the university-owned company InventUR. The university has also collaborated with Rzeszów University of Technology on patentable medical-research equipment, including the 2026 prostate-tissue testing apparatus.

=== University press and academic journals ===
The University of Rzeszów Press (Wydawnictwo Uniwersytetu Rzeszowskiego) publishes monographs, academic textbooks and research journals across the university's disciplines. Its historical roots are associated with the publishing activity of the former pedagogical college. The university also operates an Open Journal Systems platform for scholarly periodicals.

An example is Analecta Archaeologica Ressoviensia, a peer-reviewed archaeology journal published since 2006, with articles appearing exclusively in English since 2016. The university's archaeological publishing programme also includes the multi-volume Chotyniec Report, documenting the excavation, chronology and material culture of the Scythian-period settlement.

== Student activities ==
The university supports student research societies, arts and cultural groups, and student and doctoral-student representative organisations. The folk-dance ensemble Resovia Saltans performs as part of the university's cultural activities. Students and staff also participate in Erasmus+ exchanges.

The institution runs the Mały Uniwersytet Rzeszowski (Little University of Rzeszów), educational outreach for younger students, a bilingual university secondary school and a University of the Third Age. These programmes are distinct from degree-level university enrolment.

Student residences include Filon, Laura, Olimp and Merkury.

== Athletics ==
The University Athletics Centre (Uniwersyteckie Centrum Lekkoatletyczne) at ul. Cicha 2B opened in 2021 as a facility for university sport, physical education and research in exercise and rehabilitation. It includes athletics training space and laboratories concerned with biomechanics, exercise physiology and sports-related health research. The adjoining Podkarpackie Academic Sports Centre opened in June 2026 as the second stage of the complex, adding sports halls, teaching spaces and facilities for sport-science research.

University teams participate in competitions organised by the University Sports Association of Poland (AZS). The athletics centre is also used for sports biomechanics, exercise physiology and rehabilitation research.

Among the university's prominent sport-related figures are Anna Wielgosz, a physiotherapy graduate and European indoor 800 metres champion, and Rafał Wilk, a university lecturer and Paralympic champion in handcycling. The university's football team won the men's tournament at the 2026 European Universities Games in Salerno, defeating the University of Würzburg in the final.

== Notable people ==
=== Alumni and former students ===
- Zenon Brzuszko – Polish Army major general and Chief of Staff of Eurocorps since 2025; pursued graduate and postgraduate studies at Rzeszów.
- Anna Wielgosz – middle-distance runner and physiotherapy graduate; gold medallist in the women's 800 metres at the 2025 European Athletics Indoor Championships.
- Łukasz Różański – professional boxer and graduate of physical education; held the WBC bridgerweight world title in 2023–2024.
- Łukasz Federkiewicz (Kortez) – singer-songwriter and graduate of the Faculty of Music.
- Tomasz Szczepanik – musician, founder of the Polish pop-rock band Pectus and graduate of music education.
- Arkadiusz Andrejkow – visual artist and creator of the Cichy Memoriał mural project; graduated from the university's Faculty of Art.
- Oliwer Wdowik – sprinter who competed at the 2024 Summer Olympics; graduated in internal security.

=== Notable faculty ===
- Sylwester Czopek – archaeologist whose excavations at Chotyniec contributed to the identification of a Scythian-period settlement complex in southeastern Poland; rector from 2015 to 2024.
- Grzegorz Bartosz – biochemist whose research focuses on oxidative stress, free radicals and membrane biophysics; former president of the Society for Free Radical Research–Europe.
- Łukasz Łuczaj – ethnobotanist noted for research on wild food plants and traditional ecological knowledge; elected in 2026 to serve as president of the Society for Ethnobotany from 2027.
- Jadwiga Sawicka – visual artist known for text-based painting and installations; recipient of the Jan Cybis Award and the Katarzyna Kobro Award.

== See also ==
- List of universities in Poland
- Rzeszów University of Technology
- Higher education in Poland
- Chotyniec

== Bibliography ==
- Barnaś-Baran, Ewa; Dolata, Elżbieta (2022). "Social, economical and cultural transformations as the factors determining the establishment and development of the University of Rzeszów at the beginning of the XXI century". Pedagogika Szkoły Wyższej, pp. 319–335.
- Czopek, Sylwester; Trybała-Zawiślak, Katarzyna; Tokarczyk, Tomasz (2022). "The fortified settlement in Chotyniec in previous studies". Archaeology and Early History of Ukraine. doi:10.37445/adiu.2022.01.07.
- Łuczaj, Łukasz (2023). "Descriptive ethnobotanical studies are needed for the rescue operation of documenting traditional knowledge". Journal of Ethnobiology and Ethnomedicine 19:37. doi:10.1186/s13002-023-00604-5.
- Deręgowska, Anna, et al. (2026). "Bio-Inspired Albumin Platform for Synergistic Co-Delivery of Tanespimycin, Dasatinib, and Quercetin and Enhanced Therapeutic Efficacy in Triple-Negative Breast Cancer". Advanced Healthcare Materials 15 (37): e71690. doi:10.1002/adhm.71690.
- "The first finding of a Greek amphora in Poland" (2021). Praehistorische Zeitschrift. doi:10.1515/pz-2021-0006.
