= Gosau Group =

Geological group in Austria, Germany and Slovakia

- Stratigraphic range: Late Cretaceous-Eocene; ~90–50 Ma
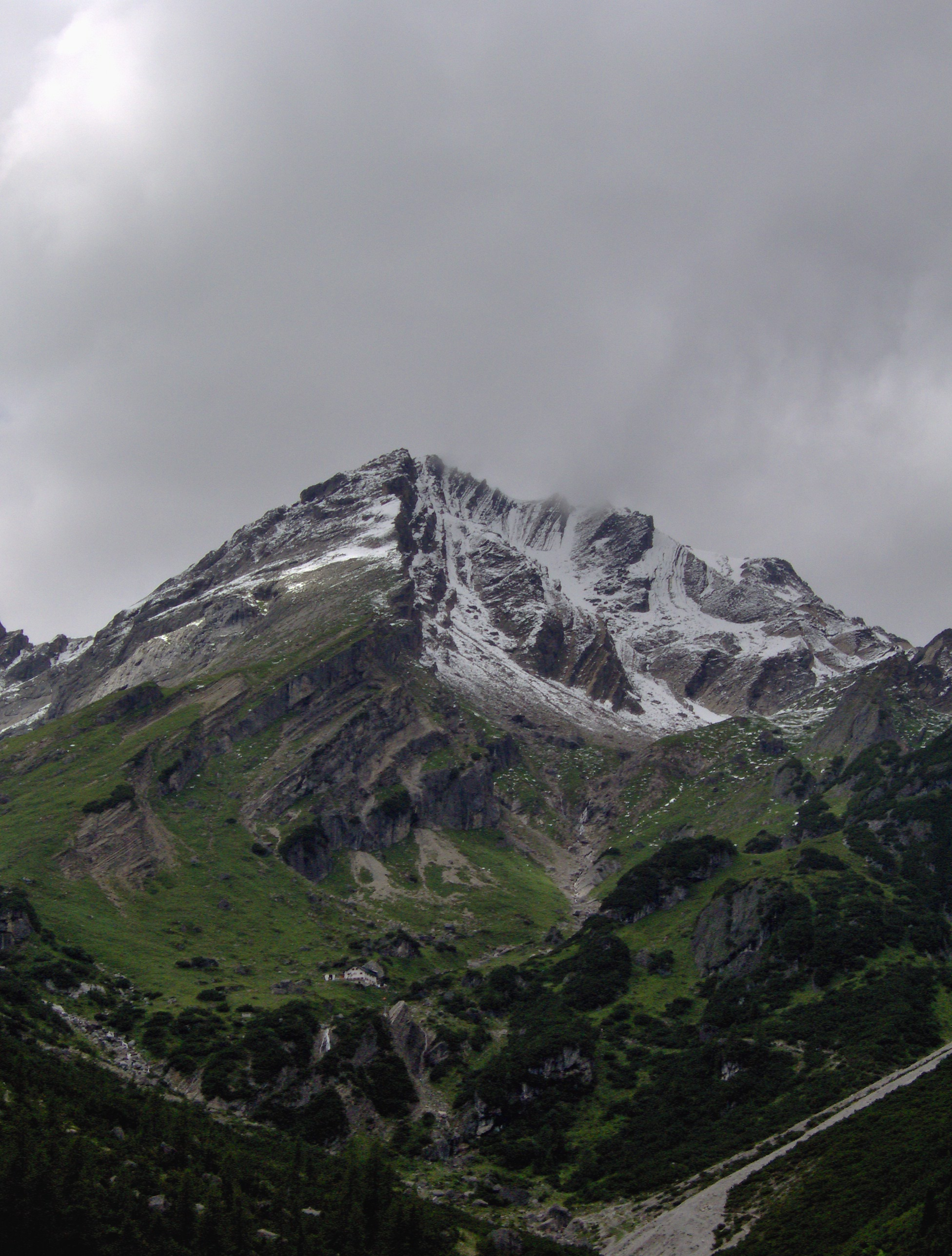
- Rocks of the Gosau Group exposed in the Imster Muttekopf
- Type: stratigraphic group
- Sub-units: Eastern realm: Upper Gosau Subgroup - Piesting & Zweiersdorf Formations Lower Gosau Subgroup - Kreuzgraben, Maiersdorf & Grünbach Formations; Western realm: Upper Gosau Subgroup - Ressen, Nierental & Zwieselalm Formations Lower Gosau Subgroup - Kreuzgraben, Schönleiten, Streiteck, Noth, Grabenbach, Hochmoos & Bibereck Formations
- Overlies: Unconformity with folded and faulted Permian to Lower Cretaceous rocks
- Thickness: 2,200–2,600 m (7,200–8,500 ft)

Location
- Coordinates: 47.6°N 13.5°E
- Approximate paleocoordinates: 32.1°N 15.6°E
- Region: Central Europe
- Country: Austria; Germany; Slovakia
- Extent: Gosau Basin, Limestone Alps
- Gosau Group (Austria)

The Gosau Group (German: Gosau-Gruppe) is a lithostratigraphic term for a geological unit found in Austria, Germany, western Slovakia and Romania. The sediments were deposited between the Late Cretaceous to Eocene and are exposed in numerous isolated basins within the Northern Calcareous Alps. The group is divided into two subgroups, the Lower Gosau Subgroup which dates from the Turonian to Campanian, approximately 90 to 75 Ma and the Upper Gosau Subgroup which dates to the Santonian to Eocene, about 83.5 to 50 Ma.

In the Gosau Basin the unit is over 2,300 m (7,500 ft) thick. The formations within each subunit vary significantly between basin. The sequence is largely marine, but the Grünbach Formation represents a terrestrial deposit and to the south-west of Vienna coal deposits have been worked in the Gosau. There are many fossiliferous units in the group, these contain both marine fossils such as ammonites and terrestrial remains, including those of dinosaurs, in the Grünbach Formation and Schönleiten Formation.

Stratigraphic contacts between the Gosau beds and any earlier units are generally unconformable and the isolated pockets in which they occur are often fault bounded. Because the Gosau Group is a lithostratigraphic unit the time of deposition (in Ma before present) may be vary from place to place but the younger Gosau beds can be distinguished from those which are older than lower Campanian by the assemblage of 'heavy minerals' they contain and in some basins the fossil content allows more accurate dating.

== Tectonic relevance ==
Upper Cretaceous sediments, particularly the Gosau beds, have been of importance in interpreting the tectonic history of the Northern Calcareous Alps.

Gosau beds rest unconformably on thrust contacts between sheets in the Northern Calcareous Alps. The unconformable relationship indicates that the early stages of thrusting ('pre-Gosau') had commenced before the Gosau units were deposited in the upper Cretaceous. During later 'post-Gosau' movements the Gosau beds were severely faulted. Those later events involved flexure folding and the northward movement of the Northern Calcareous Alps resulting in it overlying areas of the molasse deposits of Miocene age.

== Fossil content ==
Fossils which have been described from the Gosau Group include:

reptiles
| Genus | Species | Presence | Notes | Images |
|---|---|---|---|---|
| Struthiosaurus | S. austriacus | Grünbach Formation, Lower Austria | | |
| Mochlodon | M. suessi | Grünbach Formation, Lower Austria | A rhabdodontid iguanodont | |
| Rhadinosaurus | R. alcinus | Grünbach Formation, Lower Austria | Possible indeterminate ankylosaur remains | |
| "Crataeomus" | C. lepidophorus | Grünbach Formation, Lower Austria | Later found to be synonymous with Struthiosaurus austriacus | |
| "Crataeomus" | C. pawlowitschii | Grünbach Formation, Lower Austria | Later found to be synonymous with Struthiosaurus austriacus in partim | |
| "Danubiosaurus" | D. anceps | Grünbach Formation, Lower Austria | Later found to be indeterminate ankylosaurian and Struthiosaurus austriacus remains in partim "Indeterminate fragments" | |
| "Hoplosaurus" | H. ischyrus | Grünbach Formation, Lower Austria | Later found to be synonymous with Struthiosaurus austriacus | |
| "Leipsanosaurus" | L. noricus | Grünbach Formation, Lower Austria | Later found to be synonymous with Struthiosaurus austriacus | |
| "Pleuropeltus" | P. suessi | Grünbach Formation, Lower Austria | Later found to be synonymous with Struthiosaurus austriacus in partim | |
| "Megalosaurus" | M. pannoniensis | Grünbach Formation, Lower Austria | Later found to be indeterminate theropod remains | |
| Ornithocheiridae indet. | | Grünbach Formation, Lower Austria | | |
Mollusca
| Genus | Species | Presence | Notes | Images |
| "Trochactaeon" | T. conicus | Nördliche Kalkalpen, Niederösterreich, Austria | Very common fossil, rock forming | |

| Color key: Taxon / Reclassified taxon / Taxon falsely reported as present / Dubious taxon or junior synonym / Ichnotaxon / Ootaxon / Morphotaxon | Notes; Uncertain or tentative taxa are in small text; ~~crossed out~~ taxa are discredited. |

== See also ==
- List of dinosaur-bearing rock formations
