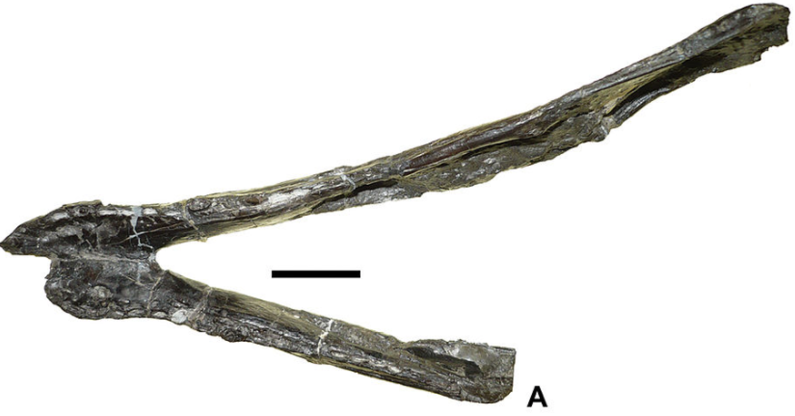
- Holotype mandible of D. carcharidens (specimen PIUW 2349/57)

Scientific classification
- Kingdom: Animalia
- Phylum: Chordata
- Class: Reptilia
- Clade: Pseudosuchia
- Clade: Crocodylomorpha
- Clade: Neosuchia (?)
- Genus: †Doratodon; Seeley, 1881

Type species
- †Doratodon carcharidens (Bunzel, 1871)

Other species
- †D. ibericus Company et al., 2005

Synonyms
- Crocodilus carcharidens Bunzel, 1871; Diratodon von Huene, 1909 (sic); Dorathodon Wellnhofer, 1980 (sic); Rhadinosaurus alcimus? Seeley, 1881

= Doratodon =

Doratodon Temporal range: Late Cretaceous, ~Santonian–Campanian Notosuchian teeth from Coniacian Italy and Maastrichtian Romania are sometimes referred to Doratodon

Extinct genus of reptiles

Doratodon is an extinct genus of Late Cretaceous crocodylomorph. Doratodon was a relatively small animal with ziphodont teeth, meaning the teeth had flattened sides and serrated edges. Two species of Doratodon are known to science: D. carcharidens from Austria (Grünbach Formation), Italy (Villaggio del Pescatore) and Hungary (Csehbánya Formation), the type species; and D. ibericus from Spain (Sierra Perenchiza Formation). Teeth similar to those of Doratodon are also known from Italy, Slovenia and Romania, though they cannot be confidently assigned to this genus. Once classified as a sebecosuchian, a study performed in 2026 suggest it was actually a paralligatorid.

Due to its relationship with crocodylomorphs native to Gondwana, Doratodon is considered to be an important indicator for the repeated faunal interchange between Europe and Africa during the Cretaceous. It was a cosmopolitan genus widespread throughout the islands that formed Europe during its time.

== History and naming ==
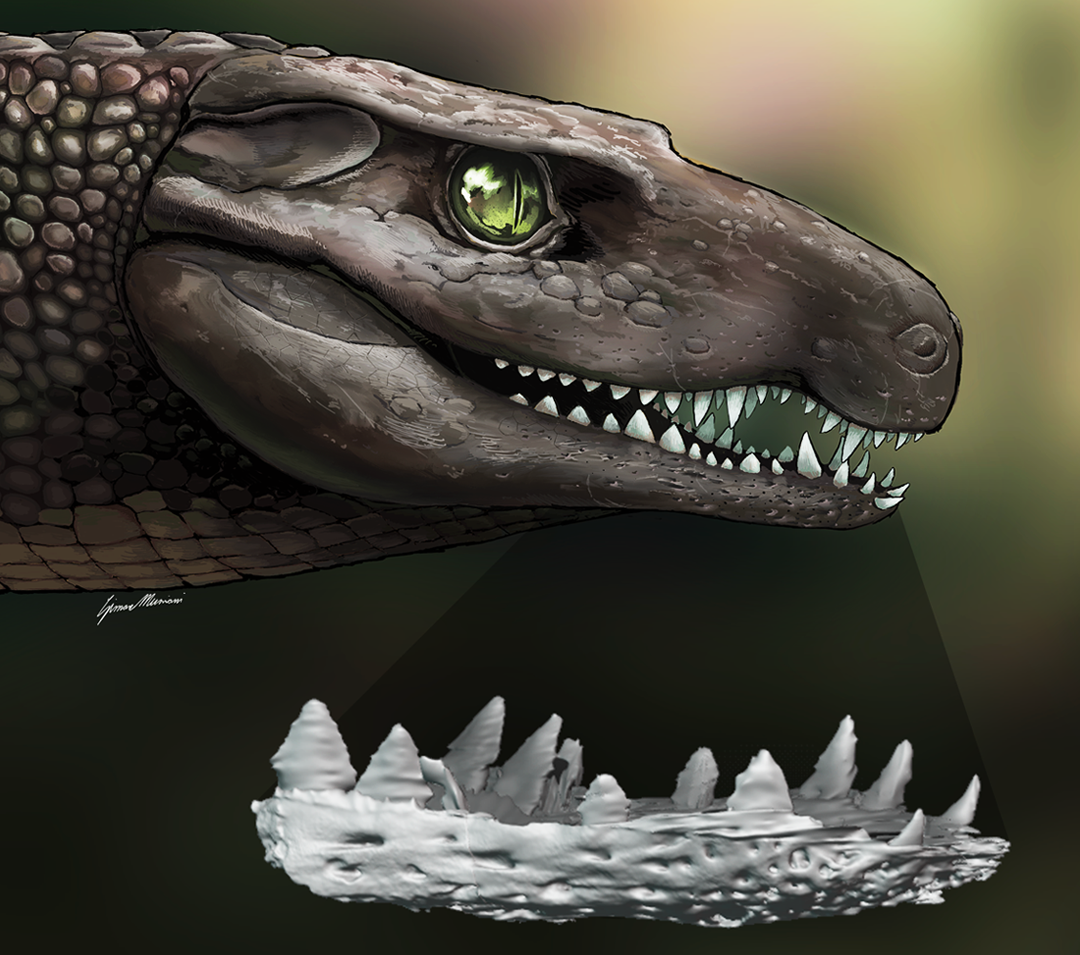
Life restoration of D. carcharidens based on the dentary specimen from Villaggio del Pescatore

The first remains of Doratodon were discovered by geologist Eduard Suess in a coal mine in Muthmannsdorf near Wiener Neustadt, Austria in 1859. Excavations at the site, now known as the Grünbach Formation (a part of the more extensive Gosau Group), yielded a variety of crocodylomorph remains including the holotype mandible PIUW 2349/57 and various other cranial remains. The mandible was described by Emanuel Bunzel as Crocodilus carcharidens in 1871 while referring the additional material only to Crocodilus on a genus level. Harry Govier Seeley however cast doubt over Bunzel's designation in 1881, proposing that the material instead belonged to a dinosaur he called Doratodon, coining the genus name. Although the name was kept, later researchers including Franz Nopcsa and Charles Craig Mook would return to Bunzel's classification of the material as a type of crocodyliform. In 1979 the Austrian crocodyliform material was reviewed by French paleontologist Éric Buffetaut, who concluded that among the additional material, a maxilla, parietal bone and some isolated teeth could all be assigned to Doratodon. However some of the reasoning is not elaborated on by Buffetaut. Between its discovery and today, Doratodon has changed classification several times, at times considered to be a dinosaur, a goniopholid neosuchian, a hsisosuchid and recently most often as a sebecosuchian. Additional material in the form of an incomplete lower jaw was later discovered in the Sierra Perenchiza Formation of Valencia, Spain. The specimen, MGUV 3201, displays the same ziphodont dentition as the type species and was named as a new species of Doratodon, D. ibericus, by Company et al. in 2005. In 2015 Márton Rabi and Nóra Sebők report the discovery of various isolated Doratodon remains from the Santonian Csehbánya Formation of Hungary, making these the oldest confirmed remains of this taxon currently known. The Hungarian material consists of a premaxilla, a maxilla, isolated teeth and two fragments of the lower jaw. In 2025 a partial lower jaw with in-situ dentition from the Campanian of Villaggio del Pescatore (northern Italy) was attributed to D. carcharidens, alongside some of the isolated teeth found in the nearby Kozina (Slovenia). Less complete remains sometimes assigned to Doratodon are known from Romania's Hațeg Island and Italy's Polazzo fossil site, dating to the Maastrichtian and Coniacian-Santonian respectively. However, in both instances these remains consist of isolated teeth only, with the referral to Doratodon being solely based on its status as the only named truly ziphodont crocodyliform of Cretaceous Europe (although Ogresuchus is also a sebecosuchian from Cretaceous Europe, it lacked serrated teeth). Due to this, Dalla Vecchia and Andrea Cau argue that such isolated remains can only be referred to indetermined Notosuchians.

D. carcharidens was named for its triangular, serrated teeth which resemble those of sharks ("carcharias" in Ancient Greek) while the species name of D. ibericus is derived from the Iberian Peninsula.

== Description ==
Doratodon was a small-bodied ziphosuchian with a narrow but deep skull, with much of that depth being formed by the maxillae. Among its defining features is the presence of an antorbital fenestra between the nares and the eye sockets. The premaxilla also shows that the snout was rather tall, as expected from a sebecosuchian, and the nares were located towards the rostrum's tip, positioned in a way that causes them to open primarily dorsolaterally (upward and to the sides) and slightly towards the front. At least four teeth were present in the premaxilla of Doratodon, the first facing somewhat forward and separated from the following three by a diastema, a brief toothless area. The largest of the premaxillary teeth appears to be the 4th. The premaxillary toothrow is not entirely straight and shows a gentle curvature. Based on known remains the maxillary toothrow is thought to have been straight, without the undulating curves seen in many modern crocodiles. However, since most maxillary fossils are believed to be located further towards the back of the skull, it is possible that the front, closer to the premaxilla, could have had more defined curves.

Most of the material known from Doratodon represents the lower jaw. When viewing this part of the skull of D. ibericus from the side, two clearly defined waves can be seen, the first more abrupt raise reaches its apex at the 4th dentary tooth while the second raise peaks with the 10th before more gently transitioning into the surangular bone. This wave-like toothrow is however less pronounced in D. carcharidens and limited to a single raise. The external opening of the mandibular fenestra is closed, which is also seen in Wanosuchus but not in other ziphosuchians.

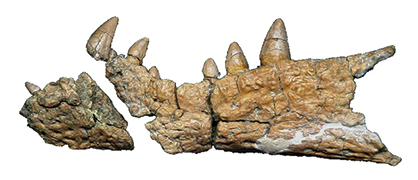
Holotype mandible of D. ibericus (specimen MGUV 3201)

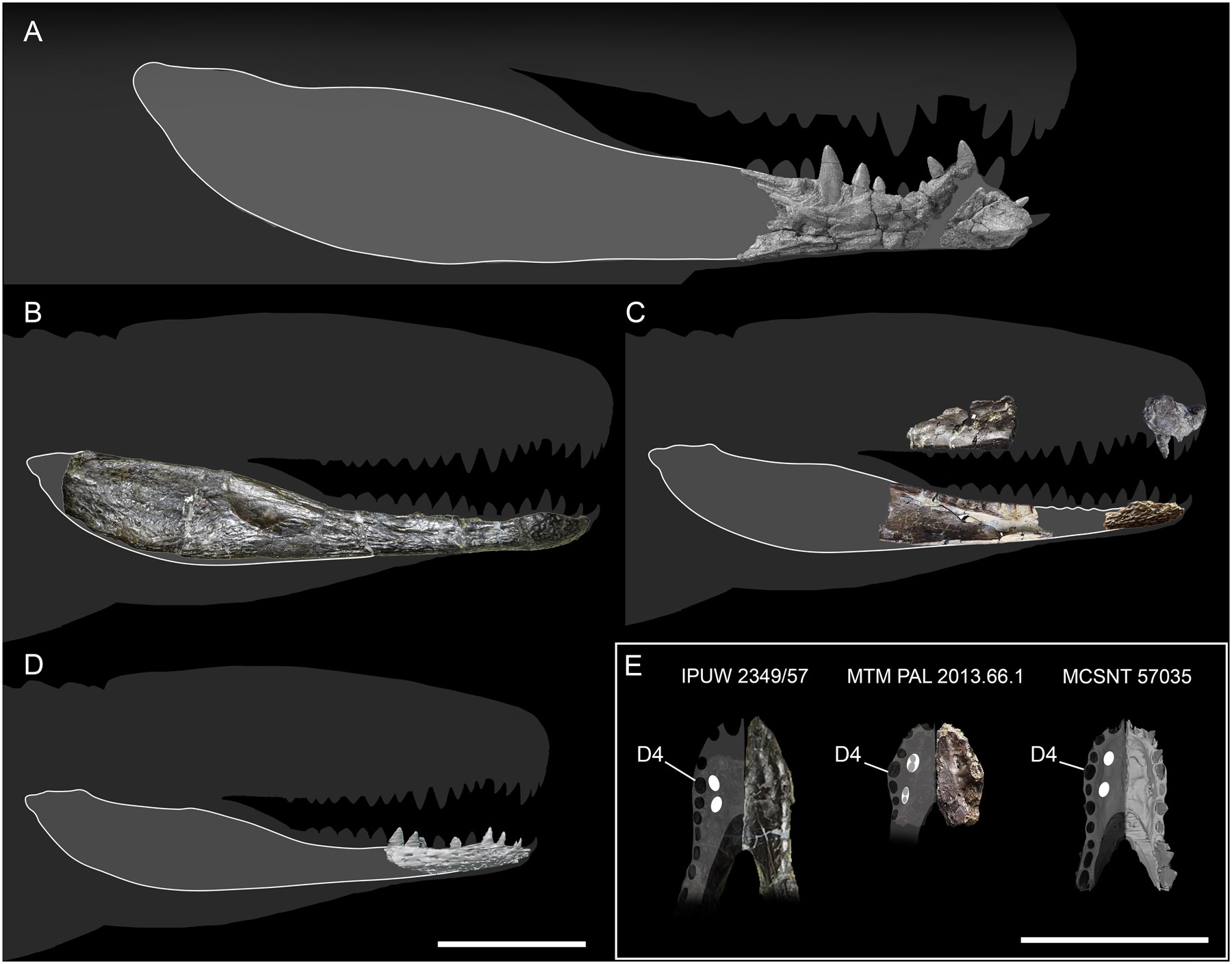
Comparable Doratodon material on scale with interpretative in vivo profiles from Muscioni et al., 2025. A, Doratodon ibericus MGUV 3201 (left dentary), modified from Company et al. (2005). B, Doratodon carcharidens IPUW 2349/57 (left hemimandible), modified from Rabi and Sebők (2015). C, D. carcharidens MTM PAL 2014.122.1 (right premaxilla), MTM PAL 2013.65.1 (left maxilla), MTM V 2010.237.1 (left posterior dentary), and MTM PAL 2013.66.1 (right anterior dentary), modified from Rabi and Sebők (2015). D, Doratodon cf. carcharidens MCSNT 57035 (anterior dentary). Missing mandible silhouettes are based on the type specimen IPUW 2349/57. E, comparison of the three D. carcharidens symphyseal regions in dorsal view, highlighting the ‘occlusal’ symphyseal pits (light ovals), modified from Rabi and Sebők (2015). Abbreviation: D4, fourth dentary alveolus. Scale bars: 50 mm.

Both sides of the lower jaw features pits on the inner side of the mandibular teeth that received the larger teeth of the upper jaw. Overall Doratodon only possessed a small number of teeth, 11 in D. ibericus and up to 13 in D. carcharidens. However, both Buffetaut as well as Rabi and Sebök argue for a higher tooth count in D. carcharidens, possibly up to 20 teeth on either side of the lower jaw. The two species of Doratodon can generally be differentiated by the size variation found among the teeth of the lower jaw. In the type species, D. carcharidens, the teeth show very little variation in size, with the dental alveoli generally ranging between 3–5 mm (0.12–0.20 in) in length with the 4th tooth being the largest (though not hypertrophied as in Baurusuchus). The difference in tooth size in D. ibericus is more developed and noticeable. In this species the 4th tooth of the lower jaw is also enlarged, with the subsequent teeth initially decreasing in size noticeably before increasing again from the 8th tooth onward, culminating in the 10th dentary tooth, the largest of the lower jaw. While the Austrian fossil likely stems from an adult based on the heavily ornamented bone surface, it has been suggested that the curvature of the tooth row may vary between animals of different ages instead of representing a difference between species. Regardless, another way to tell the two species apart is by the number diastemas. In D. carcharidens, only a single diastema is present, located between the 2nd and 3rd tooth of the lower jaw. D. ibericus on the other hand possesses an additional diastema right behind the 7th tooth.

The teeth of Doratodon are mostly ziphodont (with the exception of at least the second lower jaw tooth), which means they are compressed along their sides and lined by a serrated ridge created by a series of small denticles, clearly differentiating their teeth from the smooth, conical teeth of modern crocodilians. The shape of the individual teeth, although consistently ziphodont, can be separated into 4 morphotypes with subtle differences. The first type is relatively weakly compressed, almost conical and slender with a noticeable curve of the crown. The second morphotype, to which one of the largest teeth belongs to, is overall similar in shape to the first morphotype. It is however more strongly compressed, not as slender (twice as long as wide at the base) and with a less developed curvature. There are fossils assigned to these two morphotypes that show varying degrees of serrations, with some having reduced denticles towards the tip or along the front-edge of the tooth. This however may not be an inherent trait and could instead represent the teeth being worn down, as some instances still show the faint remains of the serration. The third tooth type takes on the form of an isosceles triangle, curving barely and being even more compressed than the second morphotype. Some of these teeth are three times longer at their base than they are wide. The fourth and final morphotype is the most extreme in this regard, showing the greatest compression but also being the lowest of the toothrow. Based on the overall form of these teeth and the shape of the tooth sockets, it is thought that they transition into one another along the toothrow, with the more conical teeth at the front and the most compressed teeth being placed at the back of the jaw.

While the absence of postcranial remains makes it difficult to estimate the size of Doratodon, it is thought to have been a rather small animal. Between the two species, D. ibericus appears to have been larger, with the dentary bone being estimated to have reached a length of up to 105 mm (4.1 in) if complete. This is notably larger than the dentary of D. carcharidens, which measures only 72 mm (2.8 in). Overall, the Spanish species also appears to have been proportionally more robust.

== Phylogeny ==
Besides Seeley, who considered Doratodon a type of dinosaur, most researchers agree that the animal represents a type of crocodyliform. Nopcsa was the first to draw parallels between Doratodon and notosuchians, suggesting that it might have had affinities with Notosuchus. This interpretation was mostly dismissed during the early to mid 20th century in favor of Mook's suggestion that it was a goniopholid, a type of neosuchian that more closely resembles modern crocodiles. In 1968 similarities to notosuchians were once again recognized, this time by Othmar Kühn who noted that the teeth resembled those of sebecosuchians. Yet another hypothesis was suggested by Éric Buffetaut, who considered Doratodon to be related to the Asian Hsisosuchus in 1979, this hypothesis was however refuted by Wu et al. (1994). Phylogenetic analysis conducted following the discovery of Doratodon ibericus confirmed the relationship between the genus and sebecosuchians. Company et al. (2005) for instance found Doratodon as the sistertaxon to Sebecosuchia as shown below.

- Ziphosuchia
  - Notosuchus
  - - Libycosuchus
    - - Doratodon
      - Sebecosuchia
        - Baurusuchus
        - Iberosuchus
        - Bergisuchus
        - Sebecidae
          - Sebecus
          - - Itaborai Crocodyliform
            - Bretesuchus

Increased understanding of Notosuchian diversity only served to solidify Doratodon's position in the group. Using both the holotype dentary and the Hungarian material, Rabi and Sebök recovered Doratodon as a basal member within Sebecosuchia itself, rather than a sister taxon to the group. While this tree is only poorly resolved, this is not the fault of Doratodon alone, as other wildcard taxa also add to the imprecise results. Regardless, this result is generally in line with what was previously recovered by Company et al. and marks a clear shift in classification between pre- and post-cladistic systematics. Still, Rabi and Sebök also consider the idea that Doratodon may have been more closely related to members of the Peirosauridae given the absence of sebecids in Cretaceous Africa, or to other crocodyliforms like the Planocraniidae given their geographic range and ziphodont dentition. The phylogenetic tree recovered by this study is shown below.

- - - Uruguaysuchidae
    - - Peirosauridae
      - Kaprosuchus
  - - advanced notosuchians
    - - Chimaerasuchus
      - - Comahuesuchus
        - Sebecosuchia
          - Doratodon carcharidens
          - Pabwehshi
          - Lorosuchus
          - - Iberosuchus
            - Bergisuchus
          - Sebecus icaeorhinus
          - - Ayllusuchus
            - Bretesuchus
          - Baurusuchidae

== Palaeobiology ==
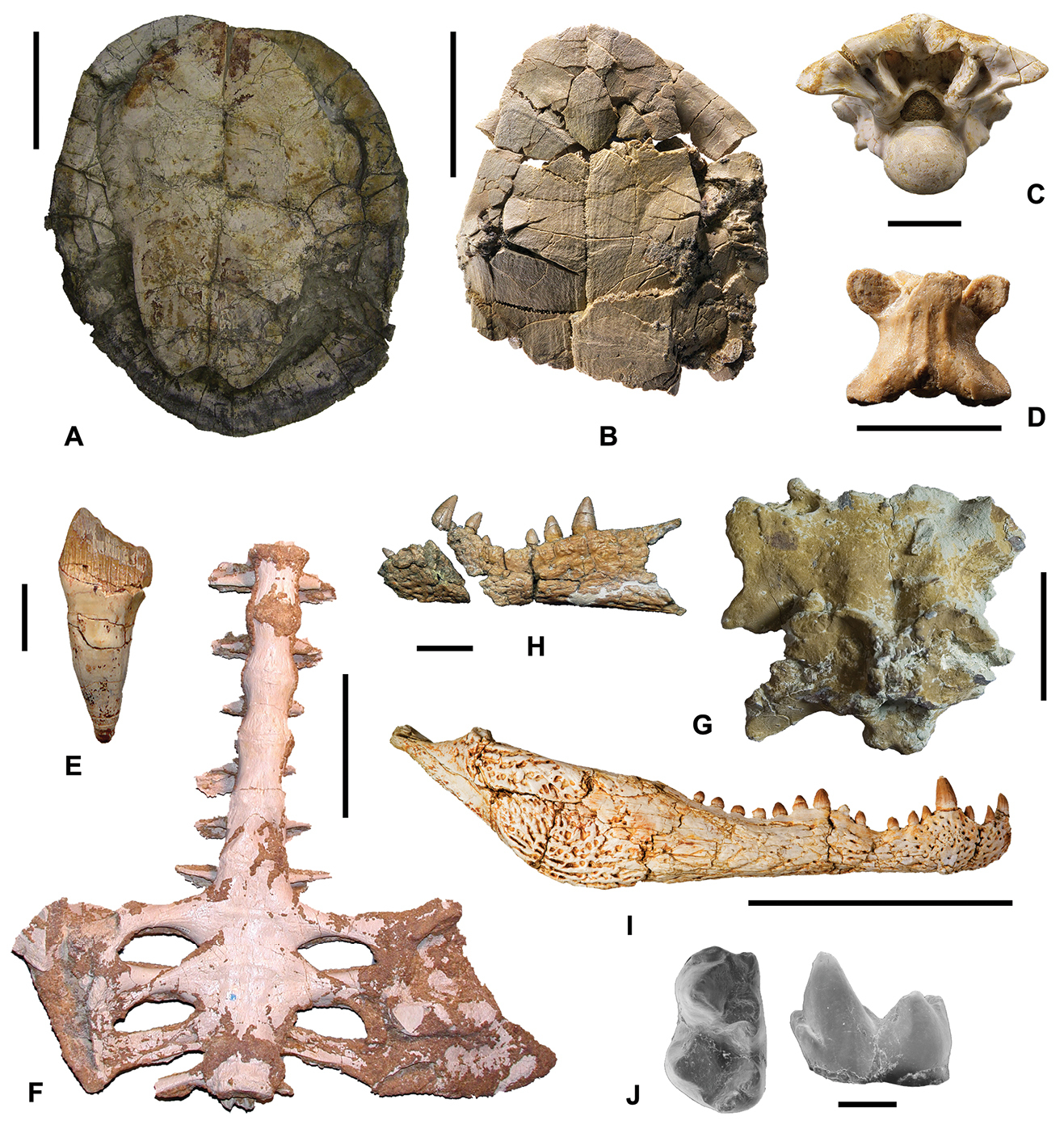
Fossils of various animals that coexisted with Doratodon

=== Palaeoecology ===
Doratodon is a cosmopolitan genus known from various European countries, which at the time would have been split into a series of islands and archipelagos separated by the Tethys Sea. Doratodon carcharidens has been found in the Campanian Grünbach Formation of Austria, Campanian Villaggio del Pescatore of Italy and the Santonian Csehbánya Formation of Hungary. Doratodon ibericus has only been found in the Sierra Perenchiza Formation in Spain, also dating to the Campanian. Its broader presence in Italy and on Romania's Hațeg Island during the Coniacian to Maastrichtian is also possible, but not certain.

It has been suggested that Doratodon, like other ziphodont Notosuchians, was a terrestrial animal, which makes it an outlier in the Cretaceous crocodyliform fauna of Europe which is otherwise primarily composed of neosuchians, which favor more aquatic lifestyles. However, the reconstructed neurovasculature of the lower jaw from the Italian soecimen suggest somewhat developed somatosensory capabilities akin to semiaquatic taxa. This may be related to high foraging plasticity or to a passively retained feature. Doratodon was a predatory animal, actively hunting the animals of its habitat, judging from the triangular, serrated teeth.

The localities that preserve Doratodon are generally dominated by dinosaurs as the primary terrestrial fauna, especially rhabdodontids, the hadrosauroid Tethyshadros and the ankylosaur Struthiosaurus. Crocodylomorphs are also common, but primarily in the form of Neosuchians. For instance, Acynodon was found to inhabit Italy, Hațeg and Spain, while Iharkutosuchus was found in Hungary. Iberia was home to Musturzabalsuchus, Ischyrochampsa and Arenysuchus. Allodaposuchus was another example of a cosmopolitan crocodyliform with a wide distribution across the European archipelago, being found in Romania, Hungary, Spain and various countries that have not yet yielded Doratodon fossils. Both Hațeg and the Csehbánya Formation additionally preserve remains of crocodylomorphs with heterodont and pseudo-ziphodont teeth distinct from Doratodon as well as the remains of the small terrestrial atoposaurids.

=== Paleobiogeography ===
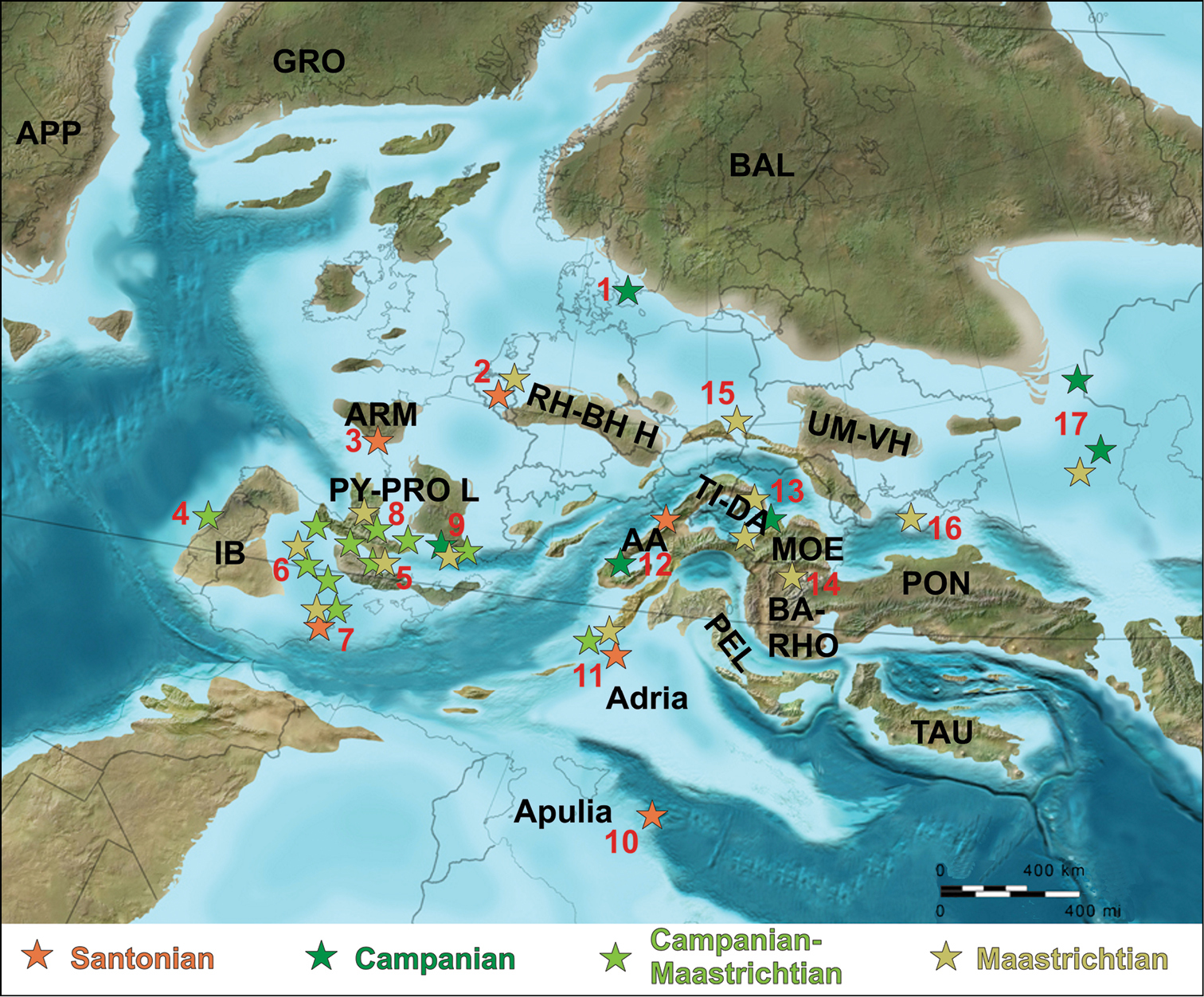
During the Late Cretaceous Europe was largely spit into a series of islands.

The classification of Doratodon as a sebecosuchian or at the very least some type of crocodyliform with Gondwanan relations is an important aspect in determining the paleobiogeography of Cretaceous Europe and Africa. Notosuchians are a traditionally Gondwanan group, primarily found in the Cretaceous of South America and Africa. While some groups such as peirosaurids, uruguaysuchids and mahajangasuchids were found around the Mediterranean, sebecosuchians were incredibly rare in this region until the onset of the Cenozoic, when Eremosuchus lived in Algeria while Bergisuchus and Iberosuchus appeared in Europe. The one exception in addition to Doratodon is Ogresuchus from the Tremp Formation of Spain. This already suggests that sebecosuchians must have been much more widespread than currently known, especially given the fact that phylogenetic analysis failed to find any close relationship between Doratodon and the other European sebecosuchians. Two major models have been proposed to explain the fauna native to the European archipelago and northern Africa during this time. According to the Eurogondwana model, Europe remained connected to Gondwana in some capacity until the Hauterivian, after the fauna of Asia and America had already been isolated from the other continents. The model further proposes that what followed was a period of isolation for Europe until making contact with Asiamerica during the Barremian to Campanian, allowing for a faunal interchange between the two regions. The Antlantogea model meanwhile suggests that during the Campanian to Maastrichtian Europe once again connected to Africa, by that point split from the rest of Gondwana, allowing for fauna to move between the continents until the Eocene.

The discovery of Doratodon remains from the Santonian of Hungary indicates that the connection proposed by the Atlantogea model must have begun at the latest during this time period, pushing the onset of the faunal interchange back by several million years. Further support for this is offered by other vertebrate remains at the locality, which includes Gondwanan groups like bothremydid turtles and abelisaurs. Discoveries from the Coniacian of Italy and the Cenomanian of France may push the faunal interchange back even further, as does the presence of carcharodontosaurs, spinosaurs and pholidosaurs from the Barremian to Aptian on both continents. In general, this clashes with the idea that Africa and Europe became fully isolated from one another after the Hautverian.

Since truly ziphodont crocodyliforms are not known from Europe prior to the appearance of Doratodon, Rabi and Sebök suggest that it must have been a true Late Cretaceous immigrant, rather than the result of a lineage that had arrived in the European archipelago during the Early Cretaceous. Likewise, later European sebecids such as Bergisuchus and Iberosuchus likely arrived through separate events during the Paleogene, as they show no signs of being descendants of Doratodon and instead are considered to be much more derived members of Sebecosuchia. The same applies to Ogresuchus, which nests deep within Sebecidae and is thought to have migrated to Europe independently during the Cretaceous, although its precise relationships are also uncertain.
