= Maiersdorf Formation =

The Maiersdorf Formation is a predominantly shallow-marine geological formation of late Santonian to possibly earliest Campanian age in Lower Austria. It forms part of the Gosau Group in the Grünbach–Neue Welt basin.

== Description ==
This formation comprises laterally variable shallow-marine deposits, including rudist and brachiopod limestones, gastropod-rich calcareous sandstones and plant-bearing siliciclastic sediments. It overlies the terrestrial conglomerates of the Kreuzgraben Formation and is succeeded by the coal-bearing Grünbach Formation, which records terrestrial to marginal-marine conditions. The Piesting Formation,overlying the Grünbach Formation, comprises marine siliciclastic deposits associated with renewed transgression and deepening.

The Maiersdorf Fm. is generally assigned to the late Santonian, although evidence from the Piesting South section suggests that deposition may have continued into the earliest Campanian. Regional age constraints include ammonites and inoceramid bivalves from the type locality, together with calcareous nannofossils and strontium-isotope data from the Piesting South section.

== Fossils ==
The formation characterised by rudists, brachiopods and the gastropod Trochactaeon. There are also multiple reports of plant fragments, with only few identifiable specimens documented. Reported plant remains include a leaf fragment assigned to Pandanites (Order: Pandanales), a palm-like stem impression, and driftwood bearing trace fossils attributed to wood-boring bivalves.
