= Grünbach Formation =

Geological formation in Austria

- Stratigraphic range: Late Santonian to early Campanian 83–78 Ma
- River habitat of Grünbach Formation
- Type: Geological formation
- Unit of: Gosau Group (Grünbach Syncline)
- Sub-units: Dreistetten conglomerate
- Underlies: Piesting Formation
- Overlies: Maiersdorf Formation
- Area: Lower Austria
- Thickness: over 150 m (490 ft)

Lithology
- Primary: Siltstone, sandstone, clay & marl
- Other: Conglomerate & coal

Location
- Region: Central Europe
- Country: Austria
- Extent: Grünbach Syncline

Type section
- Named for: Grünbach am Schneeberg

The Grünbach Formation is an Austrian geological formation that dates from the late Santonian to early Campanian age of the Late Cretaceous. It forms a part of the Gosau Group which was formed in a coastal freshwater/brackish to marine depositional environment. The Grünbach Formation is underlain by the marine carbonate Maiersdorf Formation and overlain by the marine siliciclastic Piesting Formation. The main lithologies are clay, marl, siltstone and sandstone, with a minor conglomerate component. Multible coal seams have also been noted. It is notable for its fossil diversity, including molluscs, vertebrates and the Grünbach flora. All mining operations in the Neue Welt area ceased in 1965, all later finds were made on the gobbins of the coal mines or in historic collections.

The Grünbach Formation records a changing coastal landscape with shallow freshwater habitats, peat-forming swamps and marine incursions. Fossil plants suggest a mosaic of aquatic vegetation, Pandanites swamps, palm-rich wetland forests, riverside vegetation and other forests. Dense stands of Pandanites trinervis probably supplied much of the plant material that formed the coal.

== Vertebrates ==
Most remains have been found at a single locality, which is a thin marl seam in the Konstantin mining tunnel within the Felbering Mine, in the Neue Welt area, north west of Muthmannsdorf in Lower Austria. The initial remains were discovered in 1859, after an ornithopod tooth was found in a piece of coal in a dump outside the mine by Professor Ferdinand Stoliczka, and the productive seam discovered thereafter. The first material was described by Emanuel Bunzel in 1871 and then additional material was described by Harry Seeley in 1881.

Grünbach am Schneeberg is a less well known vertebrate fossil locality of the Grünbach Formation, which has gained some relevance due to newly described fossils. The first known finds were Kallokibotion shell fragments, additionally, lepisosteid teeth were first mentioned in 2025.

=== Fish ===
Actinopterygii of the Grünbach Formation
Genus	Species	Location	Abundance	Notes	Images
Lepisosteidae	Indeterminate	Grünbach am Schneeberg	Two teeth and squamation	Possibly an Atractosteus	

=== Squamates ===
Squamates of the Grünbach Formation
Genus	Species	Location	Abundance	Notes	Images
Araeosaurus	A. gracilis	Muthmannsdorf	Vertebra	Nomen dubium: Bunzel 1871: VI. fig. 11 (Der dritte, Taf. VI, Fig. 11)	

=== Choristoderes ===
Choristoderes of the Grünbach Formation
Genus	Species	Location	Abundance	Notes	Images
Choristodera	Indeterminate	Muthmannsdorf	"Two platycoelous vertebral centra"		

=== Turtles ===
Turtles of the Grünbach Formation
Genus	Species	Location	Abundance	Notes	Images
Dortokidae	Indeterminate	Muthmannsdorf	Shell fragments		
cf. Kallokibotioninae	Indeterminate	Muthmannsdorf, Grünbach am Schneeberg	Shell fragments		cf. Kallokibotioninae shell fragment

=== Crocodyliformes ===
Crocodyliformes of the Grünbach Formation
Genus	Species	Location	Abundance	Notes	Images
Doratodon	D. carcharidens	Muthmannsdorf	"incomplete mandible, a fragmentary right maxilla, a parietal fragment, and isolated teeth"		
Eusuchia	Indeterminate	Muthmannsdorf	"mandible fragment and some postcranial material"		

=== Pterosaurs ===
Pterosaurs of the Grünbach Formation
Genus	Species	Location	Abundance	Notes	Images
Azdarchidae	Indeterminate	Muthmannsdorf	"Proximal portion of a humerus"	Previously referred to "O". buenzeli	
Pterodactyloidea	Indeterminate	Muthmannsdorf	"Articular region of a lower jaw, crushed phalangeal fragments"	Previously referred to "O". buenzeli	

=== Non-avian dinosaurs ===
Dinosaurs of the Grünbach Formation
Genus	Species	Location	Abundance	Notes	Images
Mochlodon	M. suessi	Muthmannsdorf	Cranial and postcranial elements		
Struthiosaurus	S. austriacus	Muthmannsdorf	Cranial and postcranial elements		
Tetanurae	Indeterminate	Muthmannsdorf	"Two fragmentary teeth"	Nomen dubium: ‘Megalosaurus pannoniensis’ Nearly identical to numerous teeth known from the Csehbánya Formation	

=== Coprolites ===
Vertebrate Coprolites of the Grünbach Formation
Genus	Species	Location	Abundance	Notes	Images
Coprolites	Indeterminate	Muthmannsdorf	20 specimens in six morphotypes; most indicate carnivorous to omnivorous diet with some herbivorous ones	Contain arthropod parts, plant fragments, pollen, fungal spores, cyst-like structures and hyphae	

== Aquatic Invertebrates ==
=== Cnidaria ===
Cnidarians of the Grünbach Formation
Genus	Species	Location	Notes	Images
Cunnolites			Inhabited marine habitats	

=== Gastropods ===
Gastropods of the Grünbach Formation
Genus	Species	Location	Notes	Images
Actaeonella	A. glandiformis	Dreistätten—Feibering		
Cerithium	C. münsteri	Dreistätten—Feibering		
Cerithium	C. subgranatum	Dreistätten—Feibering		
Cerithium	C. formosum	Dreistätten—Feibering		
Cerithium	C. sociale	Dreistätten—Feibering		
Cerithium	C. sexangulatum	Dreistätten—Feibering		
Dijamira	D. goldfussi	Dreistätten—Feibering		
Fusus	F. ex aff. tritonium	Dreistätten—Feibering		
Omphalia	O. kerfersteini	Dreistätten—Feibering		
Pseudomelania	P. turrita	Dreistätten—Feibering		
Pyrgulifera		Grünbach am Schneeberg	Inhabited brackish habitats	
Rostellaria	R. sp.	Dreistätten—Feibering		
Tanalia	T. acinosa	Dreistätten—Feibering		
Trochactaeon	T. gigantea	Dreistätten—Feibering	Inhabited brackish and marine habitats	
Turbo	T. ex aff. spiniger	Dreistätten—Feibering		

=== Molluscs ===
Molluscs of the Grünbach Formation
Genus	Species	Location	Notes	Images
Cucullaea		Dreistätten—Feibering		
Sphaerium	S. gregaria	Grünbach am Schneeberg	Formerly known as Cyclas gregaria; inhabited freshwater habitats	
Trochoceramus	T. cf. morgana		Identifies minimal age of Grünbach Formation	
Trochoceramus	T. cf. dobrovi		Identifies minimal age of Grünbach Formation	
Unio	U. cretaceous	Grünbach am Schneeberg	Inhabited freshwater habitats	
Polymesoda			Inhabited brackish habitats	

== Terrestrial Invertebrates ==
=== Insects ===
Insects of the Grünbach Formation
Genus	Species	Location	Fossil Type	Material	Notes	Images
Coprolithes	Indeterminate		Ichnofossil	Fecal pellets around 1mm in size	Likely produced by Termites	
Ichnotaxa	Indeterminate	Grünbach am Schneeberg	Ichnofossil	Leaf fossil with insect feeding and egg-laying traces	The egg-laying traces are endophytic and possibly stem from leaf-hoppers or damselflies. More traces like this are likely in Grünbach-Flora; more research is required.	

=== Molluscs ===
Molluscs of the Grünbach Formation
Genus	Species	Location	Fossil Type	Material	Notes	Images
Strophostomella	S. reussi	Type localities: Neualm in Rußbach am Pass Gschütt, Starhemberg castle bei Piestig Additional localities: Grünbach am Schneeberg, Muthmannsdorf	Body fossils	Mulitble specimens from Grünbach am Schneeberg in NHM Vienna and Städtische Museum Neunkirchen	Terrestrial snail, formerly known as Boysia reussi, which is based on a faulty description and drawing from Stoliczka, 1860	

== Grünbach Flora ==
Most of these specimens were found in Grünbach am Schneeberg in lower Austria. Most of these specimens were found in Grünbach am Schneeberg in Lower Austria, hence the name.

=== Pteridophytes ===
Pteridophytes of the Grünbach Formation
Genus	Species	Location	Notes	Images
Cladophlebis	C. gosauensis	Grünbach am Schneeberg, Muthmannsdorf	Foliage of tree ferns, typical for a humid habitat	
Coniopteris	sp.	Grünbach am Schneeberg		
Equisetites	sp.	Grünbach am Schneeberg	A horsetail	
Gosauopteris	G. danaeoides	Grünbach am Schneeberg, Dreistätten, Muthmannsdorf, Frankenhof	Probable affinities with Marattiaceae	
Marsileaceaephyllum	M. campanicum	Grünbach am Schneeberg	Marsileaceae, very similar to extant Marsilea	
Microphyllopteris	M. austriaca	Grünbach am Schneeberg, Muthmannsdorf		
Monheimia	M. ungerii	Grünbach am Schneeberg, Muthmannsdorf	Affinities with Matoniaceae, particularly Phanerosorus	
Raphaelia	R. lobifolia	Grünbach am Schneeberg, Höflein		
Sphenopteris	S. gruenbachiana	Grünbach am Schneeberg	Probable affinities with Schizaeaceae	
Sphenopteris	S. heterophylla	Muthmannsdorf		
Sphenopteris	S. ungeri	Grünbach am Schneeberg		
Sphenopteris	S. sp.	Grünbach am Schneeberg		

=== Gymnosperms ===
Gymnosperms of the Grünbach Formation
Genus	Species	Location	Notes	Images
Geinitzia	G. formosa	Grünbach am Schneeberg	Pinopsida, Taxodioid affinity; inhabited riparian wetland forests	
Geinitzia	G. reichenbachii	Grünbach am Schneeberg, Frankenhof	Pinopsida, Taxodioid affinity	
Lindleycladus	L. lanceolatus	Grünbach am Schneeberg		
Nilsonia	N. cf. holyi	Grünbach am Schneeberg	Bennettitales; indicates a cooler climate	
Pagiophyllum	sp.	Grünbach am Schneeberg	Part of upland vegetation	
Podozamites	sp.	Grünbach am Schneeberg	Part of upland vegetation	

=== Angiosperms ===
==== Monocots ====
Monocots of the Grünbach Formation
Genus	Species	Location	Notes	Images
Gruenbachia	G. pandanoides	Grünbach am Schneeberg, Muthmannsdorf	Pandanaceae, reproductive organs of Pandanites	
Lysichiton	L. austriacus		Araceae, genus extant	
Orontiophyllum	austriacum	Grünbach am Schneeberg		
Pandanites	P. trinervis	Grünbach am Schneeberg, Dreistätten, Muthmannsdorf, Frankenhof	Pandanaceae, main coal forming plant in Grünbach Formation	
Sabalites	S. longirhachis	Grünbach am Schneeberg, Muthmannsdorf, Felbering, Maiersdorf	Palm; inhabited riparian wetland forests	
Theiaiphyllum	T. kollmannii	Grünbach am Schneeberg		

==== Dicots ====
Dicots of the Grünbach Formation
Genus	Species	Location	Notes	Images
Brasenites	B. krasserii	Grünbach am Schneeberg	affinity with Brasenia; aquatic freshwater plant	
Celastrophyllum	C. johannae	Grünbach am Schneeberg, Muthmannsdorf	Hamamelidae	
Celastrophyllum	sp.	Grünbach am Schneeberg	Hamamelidae	
Ceratoxylon	sp.	Grünbach am Schneeberg	Reproductive structure	
Compositiphyllum	C. serratum	Grünbach am Schneeberg		
Debeya	D. insignis	Grünbach am Schneeberg		
Dicotylophyllum	D. proteoides	Grünbach am Schneeberg, Muthmannsdorf, Frankenhof		
Dicotylophyllum	D. sp.1, sp.2, sp.3, sp.4, sp.5, sp.6, sp.7	Grünbach am Schneeberg		
Ettingshausenia	E. gruenbachiana	Grünbach am Schneeberg, Maiersdorf	Platanaceae; characterizes meandering rivers	
Ettingshausenia	E. cf. laevis	Grünbach am Schneeberg	Platanaceae; characterizes meandering rivers	
Ettingshausenia	E. sp.	Grünbach am Schneeberg	Platanaceae; characterizes meandering rivers	
Grebenkia	G. europeica	Grünbach am Schneeberg		
cf. Grevilleophyllum	G. constans		Nomen dubium.	
Juglandiphyllites	J. pelagicus	Grünbach am Schneeberg, Dreistätten, Muthmannsdorf	possible affinity with Juglandaceae; characterizes meandering rivers and riparian wetland forests	
Leguminosites	L. mucronata	Grünbach am Schneeberg	Part of upland vegetation	
Menispermites	M. ettingshausenii	Grünbach am Schneeberg		
Menispermites	M. summesbergerii	Grünbach am Schneeberg		
Myricophyllum	M. serratum	Grünbach am Schneeberg	Affinities with Myrica	
Myricophyllum	M. cf. zenkeri	Grünbach am Schneeberg	Affinities with Myrica	
cf. Pandemophyllum	Indeterminate, P. cf. proteoides			
Quereuxia	Q. angulata	Grünbach am Schneeberg	Possible affinity with Trapa; aquatic freshwater plant	
Rogersia	sp.	Grünbach am Schneeberg		
Ternstroemites	T. (?) neueweltensis	Grünbach am Schneeberg		
Viburniphyllum	V. austriacum	Grünbach am Schneeberg		
Viburniphyllum	V. ermannii	Grünbach am Schneeberg		

== Pollen and Spores ==
=== Bryophytes ===
Bryophytes of the Grünbach Formation
Genus	Species	Location	Notes	Images
Stereisporites	Indeterminate		Representative of Sphagnaceae	

=== Lycopodiophyta ===
Lycopodiophytes of the Grünbach Formation
Genus	Species	Location	Notes	Images
Camarozonosporites	Indeterminate		Representative of Lycopodiaceae	
Retitriletes	Indeterminate		Representative of Lycopodium	

=== Pteridophytes ===
Pteridophytes of the Grünbach Formation
Genus	Species	Location	Notes	Images
Appendicisporites	A. tricuspidatus		Probable affinities with Schizaeaceae	
Cicatricosisporites	Indeterminate		Probable affinities with Schizaeaceae	
Cingulatisporites	Indeterminate		Affinities with Anemia	
Cyathidites	Indeterminate			
Echinatisporites	Indeterminate			
Gleicheniidites	G. senonicus			
Leiotriletes	Indeterminate		Representative of Lygodium	
Matonisporites	Indeterminate		Found in situ with Monheimia	
Microtaenia	M. austriaca			
Polypodiaceoisporites	Indeterminate			

=== Gymnosperms ===
Gymnosperms of the Grünbach Formation
Genus	Species	Location	Notes	Images
Pityosporites	Indeterminate			
Taxiodiaceaepollenites	Indeterminate		At least 2 taxa	

=== Angiosperms ===
==== Monocots ====
Monocots of the Grünbach Formation
Genus	Species	Location	Notes	Images
Arecipites	Indeterminate		Representative of Palmae	
Spinizonocolpites	Indeterminate		Representative of extant Nypa palm	

==== Dicots ====
Dicots of the Grünbach Formation
Genus	Species	Location	Notes	Images
Clavatipollenites	Indeterminate		Representative of Chloranthaceae	
Complexiopollis	Indeterminate		Affinities with Myricaceae	
Extremipollis	Indeterminate			
Hungaropollis	Indeterminate			
Krutzschipollites	Indeterminate			
Laudaypollis	Indeterminate			
Longanulipollis	Indeterminate			
Momipetes	Indeterminate		Similar to extant Engelhardtia	
Myrtacaedites	Indeterminate		Representative of Myrtaceae	
Normapolles	Indeterminate		Very abundant. possibly associated with Juglandaceae	
Oculipollis	O. sp, O. parvoculus O.zaklinskaiaiae			
Pseudoplicapollis	Indeterminate			
Semioculipollis	Indeterminate			
Suemegipollis	Indeterminate			
Tricolpopollenites	Indeterminate		At least 8 distinct taxa	
