= Rhadinosaurus =

Rhadinosaurus Temporal range: Late Cretaceous, 84.9–70.6 Ma

Scientific classification
- Kingdom: Animalia
- Phylum: Chordata
- Class: Reptilia
- Clade: Dinosauria
- Clade: †Ornithischia
- Clade: †Thyreophora
- Clade: †Ankylosauria
- Clade: †Euankylosauria
- Family: †Nodosauridae
- Genus: †Rhadinosaurus; Seeley, 1881
- Species: †R. alcimus

Binomial name
- †Rhadinosaurus alcimus Seeley, 1881

Extinct genus of dinosaurs

Rhadinosaurus (meaning "slender lizard") is a genus of nodosaurid ankylosaur first described in 1881 by Harry Govier Seeley, based on remains uncovered in Austria sometime between 1859 and 1870 by Edward Suess and Pawlowitsch. It was a herbivore that lived around 84.9 to 70.6 million years ago (during the Late Cretaceous period). The type species is R. alcimus.

== Fossils ==
The Rhadinosaurus hypodigm (holotype) consists of one tibia fragment, one limb fragment, two fibulae, and two dorsal vertebrae. The fibulae (PIUW 2349/34), which are clearly ankylosaurian, were originally identified as femora in the original description, but were eventually re-identified in a 2001 review of ankylosaur specimens from the Grünbach Formation. Sachs and Hornung (2006) re-identified one of the putative humeral bones (PIUW 2348/35) as a tibial fragment of an rhabdodontid ornithopod dinosaur, referring it to Zalmoxes sp.

== Taxonomy ==
Rhadinosaurus was initially classified as a dinosaur of uncertain position, and later considered an ornithosuchid as well as possible synonym of Doratodon, until Franz Nopcsa introduced the now popular theory that classifies it as a probable synonym of Struthiosaurus.
