= Grünbach am Schneeberg =

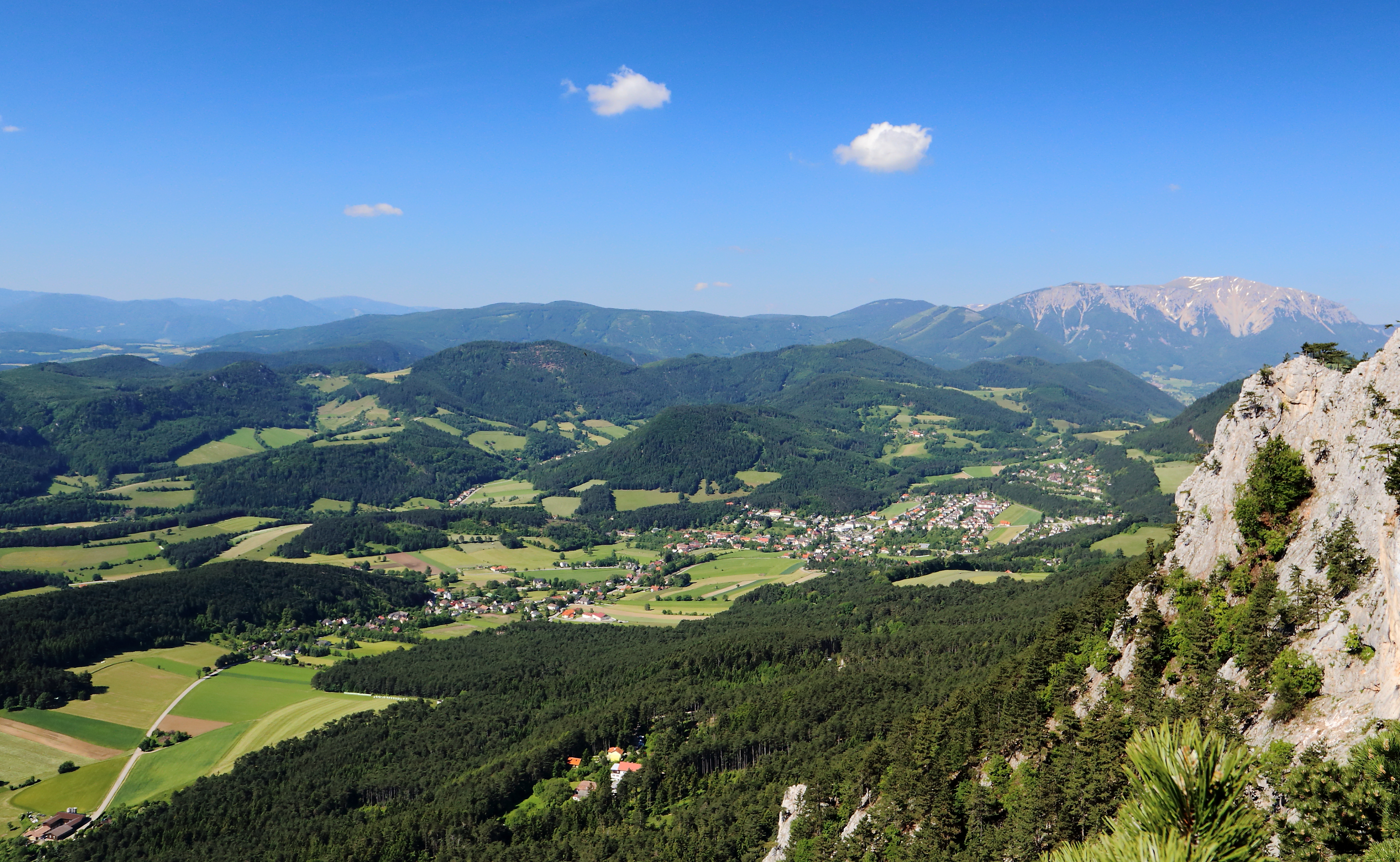

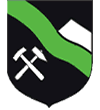
- Coat of arms

- Location within Austria
- Coordinates: 47°48′N 15°59′E
- Country: Austria
- State: Lower Austria
- District: Neunkirchen

Government
  - Mayor: Franz Holzgethan

Area
  - Total: 7.37 km^{2} (2.85 sq mi)
- Elevation: 557 m (1,827 ft)

Population (2018-01-01)
  - Total: 1,647
  - Density: 223/km^{2} (579/sq mi)
- Time zone: UTC+1 (CET)
  - Summer (DST): UTC+2 (CEST)
- Postal code: 2733
- Area code: 02637
- Website: www.gruenbach.com

Grünbach am Schneeberg is a town in the district of Neunkirchen in the Austrian state of Lower Austria. It was the site of prominent coal mining till 1965, which lead to many fossil findings in the Late Cretaceous Grünbach Formation.

== Population ==
Historical population
Year	Pop.	±%
1869	1,082	—
1880	1,091	+0.8%
1890	944	−13.5%
1900	1,127	+19.4%
1910	1,247	+10.6%
1923	2,603	+108.7%
1934	2,570	−1.3%
1939	2456Hx	—
1951	2,513	—
1961	2,487	−1.0%
1971	2,015	−19.0%
1981	1,887	−6.4%
1991	1,852	−1.9%
2001	1,776	−4.1%
2011	1,668	−6.1%
