= Hochmoos Formation =

Geologic formation in Austria

- Stratigraphic range: Santonian; ~85–83.7 Ma
- Type: Formation
- Unit of: Gosau Group
- Sub-units: Hochmoos Member; Hofergraben Member; Sandkalkbank Member
- Underlies: Bibereck Formation
- Overlies: Grabenbach Formation

Lithology
- Primary: Mudstone, sandstone, shale

Location
- Region: Central Europe
- Country: Austria

The Hochmoos Formation is a geologic formation in Austria. It preserves fossils dated to the Santonian age of the Cretaceous period.

== See also ==
- List of fossiliferous stratigraphic units in Austria
