= Sierra Perenchiza Formation =

Geologic formation in Spain

- Stratigraphic range: Late Campanian-early Maastrichtian; ~72–68 Ma
- Type: Geological formation

Lithology
- Primary: Limestone
- Other: Marl

Location
- Coordinates: 39.6°N 1.0°W
- Approximate paleocoordinates: 30.3°N 0.2°E
- Region: Valencia
- Country: Spain

Type section
- Named for: Sierra Perenchiza
- Sierra Perenchiza Formation (Spain)

The Sierra Perenchiza Formation is a geologic formation in Spain. A late Campanian to early Maastrichtian age is supported by paleomagnetic data and fossil pollen analysis. The Sierra Perenchiza Formation "consists mainly of interbedded carbonate marls and lacustrine limestones, interpreted as deposits of small ephemeral lakes and ponds of a coastal environment". Vertebrate fossils are common in the formation: these include dinosaurs, pterosaurs, crocodylomorphs, turtles, squamates, frogs, albanerpetontids, and ray-finned fish, as well as dinosaur eggshell fragments. Also known are freshwater invertebrates (ostracods, gastropods, and bivalves) and plant remains.

== Paleofauna ==
Color key: Taxon / Reclassified taxon / Taxon falsely reported as present / Dubious taxon or junior synonym / Ichnotaxon / Ootaxon / Morphotaxon	Notes; Uncertain or tentative taxa are in small text; ~~crossed out~~ taxa are discredited.

Paleofauna of the Tremp Formation
Genus	Species	Locality	Stratigraphic unit	Material	Description	Images	Notes
Azhdarchidae indet.		La Solana		Cervical vertebrae, wig phalanges	Possibly related to Quetzalcoatlus		
Doratodon	D. ibericus			Incomplete left mandible with teeth	A crocodylomorph, closely related to or within Sebecosuchia		
Megaloolithus	M. aff. siruguei			Unusually thick (up to 4.9 mm) eggshell fragments	Possible titanosaur eggs		
Rhabdodon	R. sp.			A maxillary tooth (MGUV CH-162)	A rhabdodontid		

== See also ==
- List of dinosaur-bearing rock formations
