= Acteonella =

Acteonella Temporal range: Cretaceous

Scientific classification
- Kingdom: Animalia
- Phylum: Mollusca
- Class: Gastropoda
- Family: †Acteonellidae
- Genus: †Acteonella d'Orbigny, 1843

Synonyms
- Actaeonella Herrmannsen, 1846 Actaeonella d'Orbigny, 1843

Genus of gastropods

Acteonella is a genus of extinct sea snails, marine gastropod mollusks in the extinct family Acteonellidae.

The genus is known from the Cretaceous period.

== Species ==
Species within the genus Acteonella include:

- Actaeonella borneensis Sohl and Kollmann, 1985
- Actaeonella briggsi Sohl and Kollmann, 1985
- Actaeonella browni Sohl and Kollmann, 1985
- Actaeonella cincta Winckler, 1861
- Actaeonella coquiensis Sohl and Kollmann, 1985
- Actaeonella cubensis Sohl and Kollmann, 1985
- Actaeonella delgadoi Choffat, 1901
- Actaeonella fusiformis Coquand, 1865
- Actaeonella gigantea Sowerby, 1832
- Actaeonella jicarensis Sohl and Kollmann, 1985
- Actaeonella lucianoi Maury, 1930
- Acteonella murcielaguensis Aguilar et al., 2026
- Actaeonella marchmontensis Sohl and Kollmann, 1985
- Actaeonella oviformis Gabb, 1869
- Actaeonella parvus Stanton, 1947
- Actaeonella pecosensis Stanton, 1947
- Actaeonella pompei Maury, 1930
- Actaeonella robinsoni Sohl and Kollmann, 1985
- Actaeonella silvai Maury, 1925
- Actaeonella tamandarensis Maury, 1930
- Acteonella anchietai Choffat, 1888
- Acteonella frazierensis Anderson, 1958
- Acteonella gracilis Douvillé, 1916
