= Schönleiten Formation =

Austrian geological formation

- Stratigraphic range: Late Turonian
- Type: Geological formation
- Unit of: Gosau Group
- Underlies: Noth Formation
- Overlies: Kreuzgraben Formation
- Thickness: up to 200 metres (660 ft)

Lithology
- Primary: Shale
- Other: Sandstone, coal

Location
- Country: Austria
- Extent: Gams Basin

The Schönleiten Formation is a geological formation in Austria. Part of the Gosau Group it was deposited during the later Turonian of the Cretaceous period. It primarily consists of grey, weathered yellow shales and dense sandstone, with coal bearing shales near the base. The remains of indeterminate frogs, snakes, Tethysaurines, crocodylians and the teeth of cf. Paronychodon and other indeterminate theropod dinosaurs are known from the formation.
