= Wanosuchus =

Wanosuchus Temporal range: Paleocene

Scientific classification
- Kingdom: Animalia
- Phylum: Chordata
- Class: Reptilia
- Clade: Pseudosuchia
- Clade: Crocodylomorpha
- Clade: †Notosuchia
- Family: †Wanosuchidae
- Genus: †Wanosuchus; Zhang, 1981

Type species
- †W. atresus Zhang, 1981

Genus of reptiles

Wanosuchus ("Wangjiang County crocodile") is an extinct genus of sebecosuchian mesoeucrocodylian known from Paleocene-age rocks of southern Anhui, China. It is based on IVPP V 6262, a nearly complete lower jaw, which is also the only known specimen. The bone lacks an external mandibular fenestra and has thirteen teeth, the longest of which are the fourth and eleventh. It was collected between 1970 and 1972 by Institute of Vertebrate Paleontology and Paleoanthropology (IVPP) personnel; the exact location and rock unit that produced the bone are uncertain. Wanosuchus was named in 1981 by Zhang Fakui of the IVPP. The type species is W. atresus, a reference to the absent fenestra. Zhang classified Wanosuchus under its own family within Sebecosuchia, Wanosuchidae. It shares some characteristics with Doratodon, a crocodyliform from the Late Cretaceous of Europe.
