= Grabenbach Formation =

Geologic formation in Austria

- Stratigraphic range: Santonian 86.3–85 Ma
- Type: Formation
- Unit of: Gosau Group
- Underlies: Hochmoos Formation
- Overlies: Streiteck Formation, Noth Formation

Lithology
- Primary: Shale

Location
- Region: Central Europe
- Country: Austria

The Grabenbach Formation is a geologic formation in Austria. It preserves fossils dated to the Santonian of the Cretaceous period.

== See also ==
- List of fossiliferous stratigraphic units in Austria
