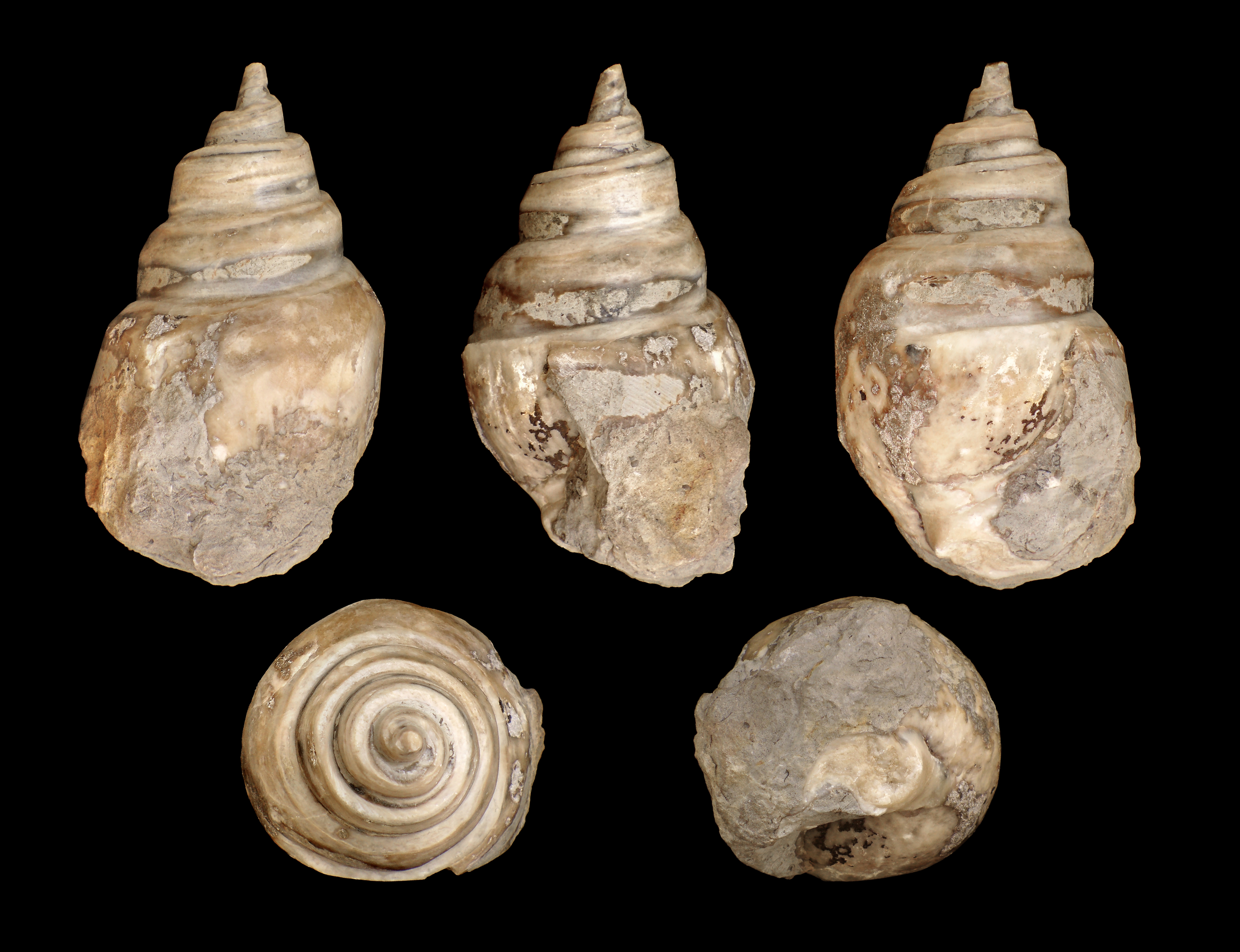
- Trochactaeon conicus

Scientific classification
- Kingdom: Animalia
- Phylum: Mollusca
- Class: Gastropoda
- Subclass: Heterobranchia
- Infraclass: incertae sedis
- Superfamily: †Acteonelloidea
- Family: †Acteonellidae; T. Gill, 1871

= Acteonellidae =

Extinct family of gastropods

Acteonellidae is an extinct family of gastropods in the superfamily Acteonelloidea.

There are five genera assigned to this family:

- Actaeonellina Pchelintsev, 1963
- Acteonella A. d'Orbigny, 1842
- Euactaeonina Wenz, 1947
- Ptychostylus F. Sandberger, 1870
- Trochactaeon Meek, 1863
