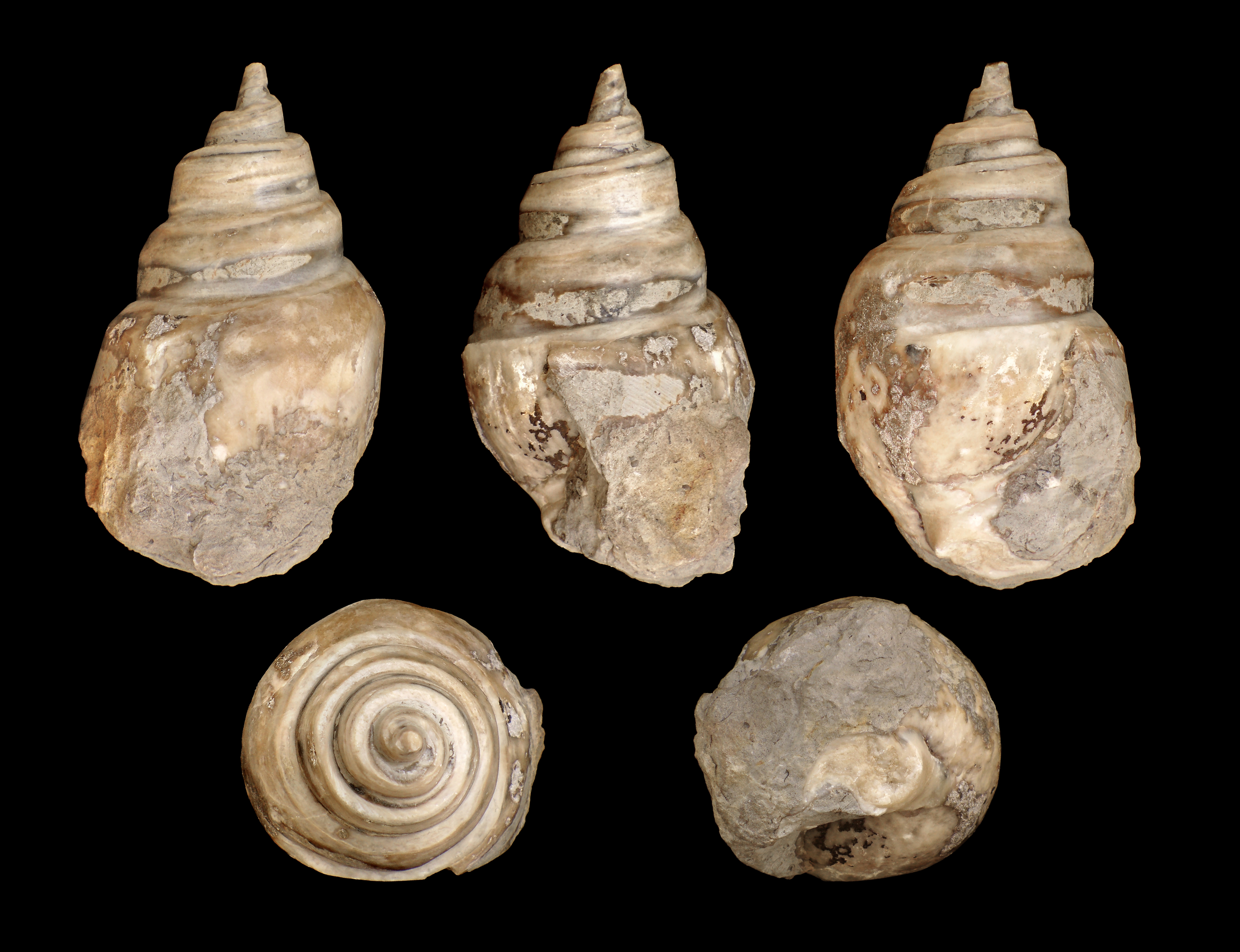
- Five views of a fossil shell of Trochactaeon conicus

Scientific classification
- Kingdom: Animalia
- Phylum: Mollusca
- Class: Gastropoda
- Family: †Acteonellidae
- Genus: †Trochactaeon; Meek, 1863

Synonyms
- Actaeonella (Trochactaeon) Meek, 1863; Imbricaria (Sohlia) Cernohorsky, 1970; Mesotrochactaeon Hacobjan, 1972; Mexicotrochactaeon Hacobjan, 1972; Mitra (Sohlia) Cernohorsky, 1970; Neocylindrites Kollmann, 1967; Neotrochactaeon Hacobjan, 1972; Palaeotrochacteon Hacobjan, 1972; Purpuractaeon Hacobjan, 1963; Sevanella Hacobjan, 1972; Sohlia Cernohorsky, 1970; Spiractaeon Meek, 1863; Trochactaeon (Mexicotrochactaeon) Hacobjan, 1972; Trochactaeon (Neocylindrites) Kollmann, 1967; Trochactaeon (Sevanella) Hacobjan, 1972; Trochactaeon (Spiractaeon) Meek, 1863; Trochactaeon (Trochactaeon) Meek, 1863

= Trochactaeon =

Trochactaeon Temporal range: Cretaceous

Extinct genus of gastropods

Trochactaeon is an extinct genus of fossil sea snails, marine gastropod mollusks in the family Acteonellidae. The genus was named in 1863.

The genus Trochactaeon is known from the Early to the Late Cretaceous epochs.

== Species ==
Species in the genus Trochactaeon include:

- Trochactaeon abbreviatus (Conrad, 1852)
- Trochactaeon absalonis (Fraas, 1867)
- Trochactaeon acuminatus (Frič, 1897)
- Trochactaeon alibeglyensis Pchelintsev, 1954
- Trochactaeon angustatus Pchelintsev, 1953
- Trochactaeon armenicus Pchelintsev, 1954
- Trochactaeon arnaudi (Cossmann, 1895)
- Trochactaeon artsachensis (Hacobjan, 1976)
- Trochactaeon atschadjurensis Pchelintsev, 1954
- Trochactaeon babkovi Djalilov, 1972
- Trochactaeon baconicus Benkő-Czabalay, 1962
- Trochactaeon belgicus (Cossmann, 1895)
- Trochactaeon beyrichii (Drescher, 1863)
- Trochactaeon biconicus Pchelintsev, 1954
- Trochactaeon boutillieri (Cossmann, 1895)
- Trochactaeon briarti Geinitz, 1874
- Trochactaeon burckhardti (Böse, 1923)
- Trochactaeon caucasicus Pchelintsev, 1953
- Trochactaeon choffati Pchelintsev, 1954
- Trochactaeon collignoni (Dartevelle & Brébion, 1956)
- Trochactaeon communis Pchelintsev, 1954
- Trochactaeon conicus (Münster, 1844) - late Cretaceous
- Trochactaeon coniformis (Böse, 1906)
- Trochactaeon conoideus (Matheron, 1843)
- Trochactaeon cordeiroi (Choffat, 1888)
- Trochactaeon cretaceus (J. Müller, 1851)
- Trochactaeon crisminensis Choffat, 1901
- Trochactaeon cumminsi Stanton, 1947
- Trochactaeon cycloideus Pchelintsev, 1954
- Trochactaeon cylindraceus Stoliczka, 1868
- Trochactaeon cylindricus Pchelintsev, 1928
- Trochactaeon dalidagensis Pchelintsev, 1954
- Trochactaeon damesi (Futterer, 1892)
- Trochactaeon darwasensis Djalilov, 1964
- Trochactaeon dolioliformis Pchelintsev, 1953
- Trochactaeon dubertreti (Delpey, 1940)
- Trochactaeon ellipticus (Zekeli, 1852)
- Trochactaeon excelsus Pchelintsev, 1954
- Trochactaeon frazierensis (F. M. Anderson, 1958)
- Trochactaeon galloprovincialis Cossmann, 1896
- Trochactaeon ghazirensis (Delpey, 1940)
- Trochactaeon giganteus (J. De C. Sowerby, 1832)
- Trochactaeon glandiformis (Zekeli, 1852)
- Trochactaeon goldfussi (A. d'Orbigny, 1850)
- Trochactaeon gosaviensis Kollmann, 1967
- Trochactaeon gracilis Pchelintsev, 1954
- Trochactaeon gradatus Kollmann, 1967
- Trochactaeon granthamensis Sohl & Kollmann, 1985
- Trochactaeon gulistanensis Pchelintsev, 1954
- Trochactaeon humei (Greco, 1916)
- Trochactaeon idjevanensis (Hacobjan, 1976)
- Trochactaeon intermedius Choffat, 1901
- Trochactaeon kuehni Kollmann, 1967
- Trochactaeon lamarcki (J. De C. Sowerby, 1835)
- Trochactaeon laticostata (Hacobjan, 1972)
- Trochactaeon latus Pchelintsev, 1954
- Trochactaeon longisulcus (Hacobjan, 1976)
- Trochactaeon mammilatus (Hacobjan, 1976)
- Trochactaeon matensis (Fittipaldi, 1901)
- Trochactaeon melonensis Sohl & Kollmann, 1985
- Trochactaeon minutus Stoliczka, 1868
- Trochactaeon mirabilis Pchelintsev, 1954
- Trochactaeon nelsoni Sohl & Kollmann, 1985
- Trochactaeon obesus Pchelintsev, 1954
- Trochactaeon obtusus (Zekeli, 1852)
- Trochactaeon oliviformis (Coquand, 1865)
- Trochactaeon ornatus Pchelintsev, 1953
- Trochactaeon ouremensis Choffat, 1901
- Trochactaeon ovalis Pchelintsev, 1953
- Trochactaeon packardi (F. M. Anderson, 1958)
- Trochactaeon palmeri Sohl & Kollmann, 1985
- Trochactaeon pamiricum Pchelintsev, 1960
- Trochactaeon parvus (Blanckenhorn, 1890)
- Trochactaeon patagonicus (Feruglio, 1936)
- Trochactaeon pchelincevi (Hacobjan, 1963)
- Trochactaeon projectiliformis Kollmann, 1967
- Trochactaeon punctatus (Maldonado-Koerdell, 1950)
- Trochactaeon quadratus Pchelintsev, 1954
- Trochactaeon regularis Pchelintsev, 1953
- Trochactaeon renauxianus (A. d'Orbigny, 1842)
- Trochactaeon rossi Sohl & Kollmann, 1985
- Trochactaeon sanctaecrucis (Futterer, 1892)
- Trochactaeon scalatus (Schnarrenberger, 1901)
- Trochactaeon schiosensis (G. Böhm, 1895)
- Trochactaeon schirabadensis Pchelintsev, 1953
- Trochactaeon similis Pchelintsev, 1954
- Trochactaeon solidus Pchelintsev, 1954
- Trochactaeon speciosus Pchelintsev, 1954
- Trochactaeon subpruniformis Pchelintsev, 1954
- Trochactaeon subrenauxi Pchelintsev, 1928
- Trochactaeon szontaghi (Todiriță-Mihăilescu, 1966)
- Trochactaeon teaensis Sohl & Kollmann, 1985
- Trochactaeon truncatus Stoliczka, 1868
- Trochactaeon tuberculatus (Hacobjan, 1974)
- Trochactaeon tumidus Pchelintsev, 1953
- Trochactaeon variospiralis (Hacobjan, 1976)
- Trochactaeon vasmikuchensis Djalilov, 1964
- Trochactaeon vediensis (Hacobjan, 1963)
- Trochactaeon ventricosus Hojnos, 1921
- Trochactaeon woodsi (Rennie, 1930)
- Trochactaeon wrighti Sohl & Kollmann, 1985
- Trochactaeon zekelii Pchelintsev, 1954
