= Moran =

Moran may refer to:

== Places ==
=== Antarctica ===
- Moran Bluff, Marie Byrd Land
- Moran Buttress, Marie Byrd Land
- Moran Glacier, Alexander Island

=== Asia ===
- Morinda, Punjab or Moran, a city in Punjab, India
- Moran Town, Assam, India
- Moran, Israel, a kibbutz
- Moran Hill, North Korea
- Moran Station, a station of the Seoul Metropolitan Subway in Seongnam, South Korea

=== North America ===
- Moran, British Columbia, Canada, a railway point
  - Moran Canyon (British Columbia), a natural feature on the Fraser River
- Moran, Indiana, an unincorporated town
- Moran, Kansas, a city
- Moran, Ohio, a neighborhood of Streetsboro, Ohio
- Moran, Texas, a city
- Moran, Wyoming, an unincorporated community
- Moran Canyon (Wyoming)
- Moran Creek (Minnesota)
- Moran Creek (Hay Creek tributary), Montana
- Moran Formation, Texas, a geologic formation
- Moran Lake, British Columbia, Canada
- Moran River, Michigan
- Moran State Park, Washington
- Moran Township, Michigan
- Moran Township, Richland County, North Dakota, Richland County, North Dakota
- Moran Township, Todd County, Minnesota
- Mount Moran, Wyoming

=== South America ===
- Morán Municipality, Venezuela

=== Elsewhere ===
- 10372 Moran, an asteroid

== Persons with the name ==
- Moran (given name), a unisex given name
- Moran (surname), an Irish surname
- Morán, a Spanish surname
- Moran (Syriac), Syriac title for Jesus Christ

== Groups of people ==
- Moran (Maasai) or Il-murran, warriors among the Maasai of Kenya
- Moran people, an ethnic group of Assam, India

== Fictional characters ==
- Moran, the title character of the 1922 American film Moran of the Lady Letty
- Moran, a female Irish Quidditch player in Harry Potter and the Goblet of Fire
- Gia Moran, a female character in Power Rangers Megaforce
- Michael Moran, the title character of the 1928 American film Moran of the Marines
- Sebastian Moran, an enemy of Sherlock Holmes

== Other uses ==
- MORAN, an acronym for Multi-Operator Radio Access Network
- Baron Moran, British peerage title
- Kenyan Morans, nickname of Kenya's national basketball team
- Moran Building, Washington, DC, on the National Register of Historic Places
- Moran Dam, a proposed dam on the Fraser River at Moran, British Columbia, Canada
- Moran language, an extinct Tibeto-Burman language of India
- Moran Medal in Statistical Sciences, awarded every two years by the Australian Academy of Science
- Moran Municipal Generation Station, Burlington, Vermont, a power plant
- Moran Shipping Agencies, a U.S.-based steamship agency company
- Moran's Oyster Cottage, a seafood restaurant and pub in Kilcolgan, County Galway, Ireland

== See also ==
- Morans Falls, Queensland, Australia
- Moren, a surname
- Morin (disambiguation)
- Moron (disambiguation)
- Muran (disambiguation)
- Morano (disambiguation)
