= Moron =

Moron or Morón may refer to:

- Moron (psychology), disused term for a person with a mental age between 7 and 10

== People ==
- Morón (surname), various people so named
- Edgar Moron (1941–2023), German politician

== Places ==
=== Ancient world ===
- Moron (ancient city), mentioned by the Greek geographer Strabo

=== Argentina ===
- Morón, Buenos Aires, a city in Greater Buenos Aires, Argentina
- Roman Catholic Diocese of Morón, Argentina
- Morón Partido, a district in Buenos Aires Province

=== Mongolia ===
- Mörön, a town
- Mörön, Khentii, a district

=== Spain ===
- Morón de la Frontera, also known as Morón, a municipality
  - Morón Air Base, in Morón de la Frontera

=== United States ===
- Moron, later renamed Taft, California, a city
- Moron Lake, a lake in Alaska

=== Elsewhere ===
- Morón, Cuba, a city
- Moron, Grand'Anse, Haiti, a commune
- Morong, Bataan, the Philippines, a municipality formerly known as Moron
- Morón, Venezuela, a town
- Moron (mountain), in Switzerland, part of the Jura Mountains
- Lac de Moron, a lake on the border between France and Switzerland

== Other uses ==
- Moron (bacteriophage), an extra gene in prophage genomes that do not have a phage function in the lysogenic cycle
- Moron (beetle), a genus of beetles in the family Cerambycidae
- Moron (Book of Mormon), a name and a location in the Book of Mormon
- Morón (food), a type of rice cake native in the Eastern Visayas, Philippines
- "Moron" (Sum 41 song)
- "Moron" (KMFDM song)
- Morön BK, Swedish football team
- Moron insult, Rude word insinuating someone is dumb

== See also ==
- Moran (disambiguation)
- Morin (disambiguation)
- Morion (disambiguation)
- Maroon (disambiguation)
