= Moren =

Moren is an Irish surname, which first originated from County Mayo, Ireland. The original Gaelic form of the name Moren is O Morain or O Moghrain, this is derived from the word "mor" which means "big." Notable people with the surname include:

- Lew Moren, baseball pitcher
- Peter Morén, member of Swedish band Peter Bjorn and John
- Peter Morén (drummer), heavy metal drummer
- Teri Moren (born 1969), American basketball coach
- Valtteri Moren, Finnish footballer

== See also ==
- Moran (disambiguation)
- Morin (disambiguation)
- Moron (disambiguation)
- More (disambiguation)
