= Morin =

Morin is a surname of different Romance origins. In northern Italy it derives from the Ladin term for «mill» (molina in Latin). In French it generally refers to people of Moorish descent; or it derives from the ancient Celtic tribe of Morini who once inhabited the coast of modern day Belgium. The Gaulish ethnonym Morini (sing. Morinos) literally means 'those of the sea', that is to say the 'sea people' or the 'sailors'; related to Moran. This use stems from Proto-Celtic *mori 'sea'.

It may also refer to:

== People ==
=== Canada ===
- Albertine Morin-Labrecque (1886–1957) Canadian pianist
- Augustin-Norbert Morin (1803–1865), lawyer, judge and politician, joint Premier of the Province of Canada
- Blain Morin, Canadian politician and labour union organizer
- Claude Morin (ADQ politician) (born 1953), Canadian politician
- Claude Morin (PQ politician) (born 1929), Canadian politician
- Gérard-Raymond Morin (1940–2024), Canadian politician
- Gilles Morin (born 1931), Canadian politician in Ontario
- Guy Paul Morin, Canadian wrongfully convicted of a 1984 murder
- Jacques-Yvan Morin (1931–2023), Canadian politician in Quebec
- Jean-Baptiste Morin (politician) (1840–1911), Canadian politician
- Karl Morin-Strom (also Karl Strom) (born 1952), Canadian politician in Ontario
- Marie-Eve Morin, Canadian philosopher
- Marie-Lucie Morin, Canadian public official and diplomat
- Pat Morin, Canadian computer scientist
- Pete Morin (1915–2000), Canadian hockey player
- Randy Charles Morin (born 1969), Canadian author and blogger
- René Morin (1883–1955), head of the Canadian Broadcasting Corporation during World War II
- Robert Morin (born 1949), Canadian film director
- Samuel Morin (born 1995), Canadian ice hockey player
- Victor Morin, inventor of the Morin code, a parliamentary authority used mainly in Quebec

=== France ===
- Arthur Morin (1795–1880), French physicist
- Bernard Morin (1931–2018), French mathematician, especially a topologist
- Edgar Morin (also Edgar Nahoum; 1921–2026), French philosopher and sociobiologist
- Émilienne Morin (1901–1991) French anarcho-syndicalist, shorthand typist, partner of Buenaventura Durruti.
- Hervé Morin (born 1961), Minister of Defence of France
- Jean Morin (artist) (c.1595 or 1605–1650), French baroque artist
- Jean Morin (theologian) (also Joannes Morinus) (1591–1659), French theologian and biblical scholar
- Jean-Baptiste Morin (composer) (1677–1745), French composer
- Jean-Baptiste Morin (mathematician) (also Morinus) (1583–1656), French mathematician, astrologer and astronomer

=== Italy ===
- Enrico Morin (1841–1910), Italian admiral and politician

=== Sweden ===
- Linus Morin (born 1987), Swedish ice hockey player

=== United Kingdom ===
- Charles Morin, nom de plume used by Winston Churchill
- Nea Morin (1905–1986), British rock climber

=== United States ===
- Andy Morin, American producer and musician with Death Grips
- Brent Morin, American comedian, stand-up comic and actor
- Henry Louis Morin (1899-1949), American farmer, labor union activist, and politician
- Jeremy Morin, American ice hockey player
- John M. Morin (1868–1942), American congressman from Pennsylvania
- Lee Morin (born 1952), American NASA astronaut
- Mike Morin (born 1991), American baseball player
- Parker Morin (born 1991), American baseball coach
- Robert E. Morin, chief judge of the Superior Court of the District of Columbia
- Roger Morin (1941–2019), American Roman Catholic bishop
- William H. Morin, American soldier awarded Medal of Honor

== See also ==
- Moran (disambiguation)
- Morini (disambiguation)
- Morrin (disambiguation)
