= Moran Creek =

Moran Creek may refer to:

- Moran Creek (Minnesota)
- Moran Creek (Hay Creek tributary), a stream in Montana
