= Morón (surname) =

Morón is a surname which may refer to:

- Alonzo G. Morón (1909–1971), Danish Virgin Islands-born American educator, university president, and civil servant
- Guillermo Morón (1926–2021), Venezuelan writer and historian
- Jaime Morón (1950–2005), Colombian footballer
- Daniel Morón (born 1957), Argentine former football goalkeeper who played in Chile
- Álex López Morón (born 1970), Spanish retired tennis player
- Erik Morón (born 1975), Bolivian politician
- Gisela Morón (born 1976), Spanish synchronized swimmer and 2008 Olympic silver medalist

== See also ==
- Edgar Moron (born 1941), German politician
