= 2018 United States Senate election in New York =

- November 6, 2018
- Turnout: 47.99%
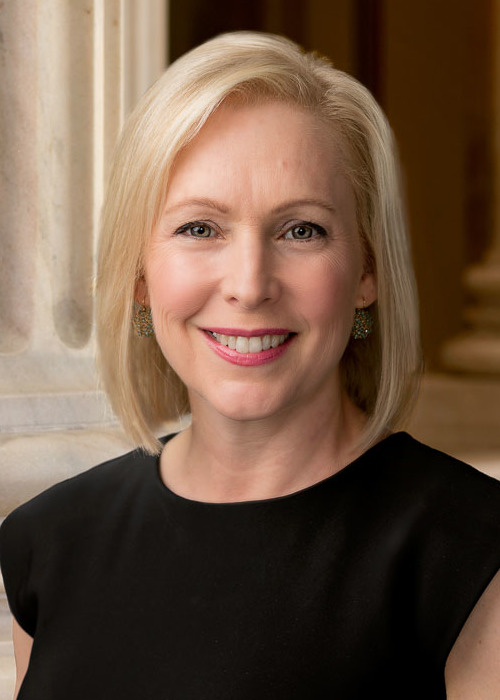

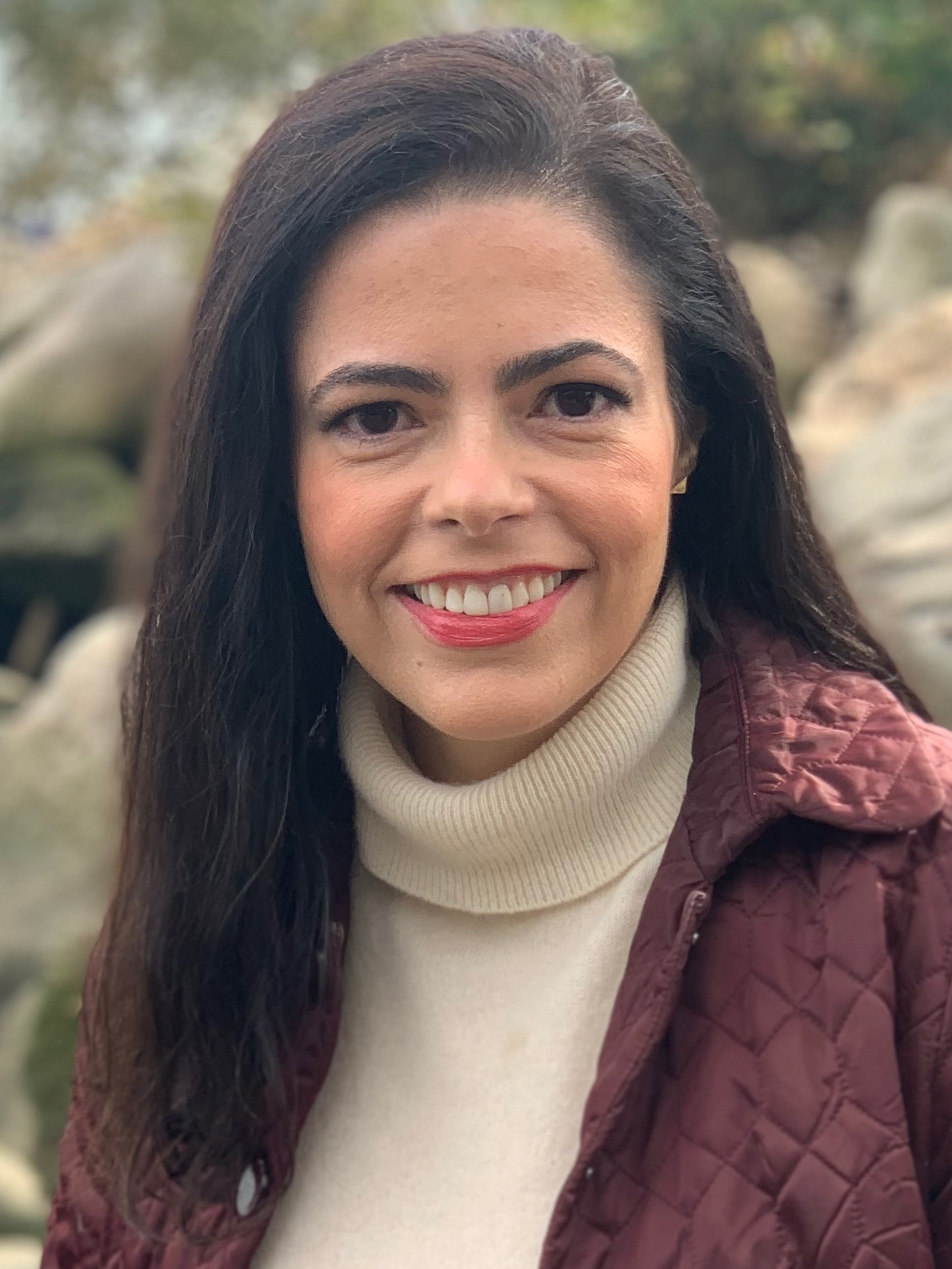
Nominee	Kirsten Gillibrand	Chele Farley
Party	Democratic	Republican
Alliance	Parties: Independence; Working Families; Women's Equality	Parties: Conservative; Reform
Popular vote	4,056,931	1,998,220
Percentage	66.96%	32.98%
- Gillibrand: 40–50% 50–60% 60–70% 70–80% 80–90% >90% Farley: 50–60% 60–70% 70–80% 80–90% >90% Tie: 40–50% 50% No data
U.S. senator before election
Kirsten Gillibrand
Democratic
Elected U.S. Senator
Kirsten Gillibrand
Democratic

The 2018 United States Senate election in New York took place on November 6, 2018. Incumbent U.S. Senator Kirsten Gillibrand was re-elected to a second full term, defeating Republican Chele Chiavacci Farley with nearly 67% of the vote. Gillibrand carried a majority of the state's counties and 26 of the state's 27 congressional districts, including five that elected Republicans the same night.

== Democratic primary ==
Kirsten Gillibrand ran unopposed in the primary and automatically became the Democratic nominee.

=== Candidates ===
==== Nominee ====
- Kirsten Gillibrand, incumbent U.S. senator

==== Failed to file ====
- Scott Noren, oral and maxillofacial surgeon

==== Declined ====
- Chelsea Clinton, daughter of former senator Hillary Clinton
- Andrew Cuomo, incumbent New York governor
- Caroline Kennedy, former United States ambassador to Japan, daughter of former president John F. Kennedy and member of the Kennedy family
- Andrew Yang, entrepreneur (ran for Democratic presidential nomination in 2020)

== Republican primary ==
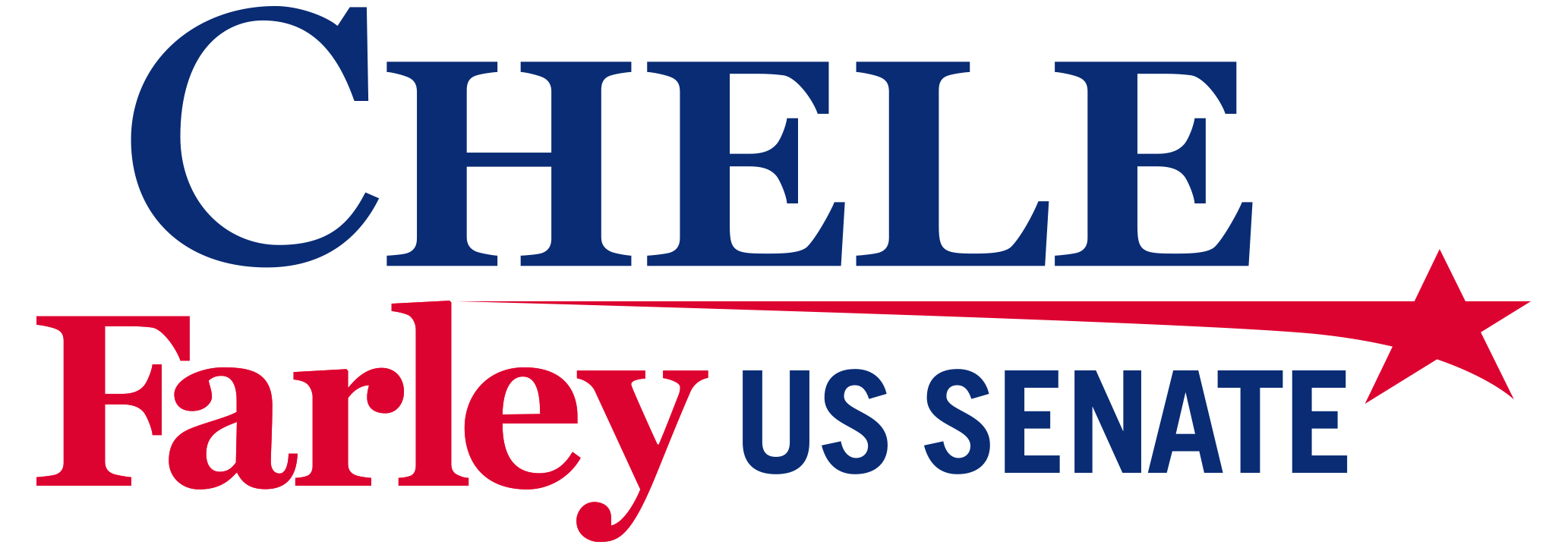
Chele Farley's senate campaign logo

The Republican Party nominated private equity executive Chele Chiavacci Farley.

=== Candidates ===
==== Nominee ====
- Chele Chiavacci Farley, private equity executive

==== Failed to file ====
- Rocky De La Fuente, businessman and perennial candidate
- Patrick John Hahn, civic activist
- Rafael Arden Jones Sr.
- David A. Webber

==== Declined ====
- Chris Gibson, former U.S. representative
- Joseph Holland, former commissioner of the Department of Housing and Community Renewal (running for governor)

== General election ==
=== Endorsements ===
Kirsten Gillibrand (D)

Individuals

- Amy Schumer, actress

Organizations

- AFL-CIO
- CSEA
- EMILY's List
- End Citizens United
- Giffords
- Human Rights Campaign
- National Organization for Women
- Natural Resources Defense Council Action Fund
- New York State United Teachers
- PSC (Professional Staff Congress) CUNY
- Sierra Club
- Working Families

Newspapers

- AM New York
- Newsday
- NY Daily News
- The Post-Standard
- The Post Star
Chele Farley (R)

U.S. president

- Donald Trump, 45th president of the United States

U.S. senators

- Al D'Amato, former U.S. senator (R-NY)

U.S. representative

- Chris Collins, U.S. representative (R-NY-27)
- Dan Donovan, U.S. representative (R-NY-11)
- John Faso, U.S. representative (R-NY-19)
- John Katko, U.S. representative (R-NY-24)
- Peter King, U.S. representative (R-NY-2)
- Tom Reed, U.S. representative (R-NY-23)
- Elise Stefanik, U.S. representative (R-NY-21)
- Claudia Tenney, U.S. representative (R-NY-22)
- Lee Zeldin, U.S. representative (R-NY-1)

Governors

- Mike Huckabee, former governor of Arkansas
- George Pataki, former governor of New York

Individuals

- Rudy Giuliani, former mayor of New York City
- Sean Hannity, conservative talk radio host and host of Hannity

Organizations

- Crown Heights PAC

Newspapers

- The Jewish Press
- New York Post

=== Predictions ===
Source	Ranking	As of
The Cook Political Report	Safe D	October 26, 2018
Inside Elections	Safe D	November 1, 2018
Sabato's Crystal Ball	Safe D	November 5, 2018
Fox News	Likely D	July 9, 2018
CNN	Safe D	July 12, 2018
RealClearPolitics	Safe D	June 7, 2018

†Highest rating given

=== Polling ===
View source data.

Poll source	Date(s) administered	Sample size	Margin of error	Kirsten Gillibrand (D)	Chele Chiavacci Farley (R)	Other	Undecided
Research Co.	November 1–3, 2018	450	± 4.6%	60%	32%	–	8%
Siena College	October 28 – November 1, 2018	641	± 3.9%	58%	35%	0%	8%
Quinnipiac University	October 10–16, 2018	852	± 4.4%	58%	33%	0%	8%
Siena College	September 20–27, 2018	701	± 3.9%	61%	29%	0%	9%
Liberty Opinion Research (R-Reform Party)	August 29–30, 2018	2,783	± 1.9%	51%	36%	–	13%
Quinnipiac University	July 12–16, 2018	934	± 4.1%	57%	30%	1%	10%
Siena College	June 4–7, 2018	745	± 3.7%	61%	28%	0%	8%
Quinnipiac University	April 26 – May 1, 2018	1,076	± 3.7%	58%	23%	1%	16%
Siena College	April 8–12, 2018	692	± 4.3%	58%	27%	0%	13%
Siena College	March 11–16, 2018	772	± 4.0%	60%	24%	0%	14%

=== Results ===
United States Senate election in New York, 2018
Party	Candidate	Votes	%	±%
Democratic	Kirsten Gillibrand	3,755,489	61.98%	−4.38%
Working Families	Kirsten Gillibrand	160,128	2.64%	−1.12%
Independence	Kirsten Gillibrand	99,325	1.64%	−0.43%
Women's Equality	Kirsten Gillibrand	41,989	0.69%	N/A
Total	Kirsten Gillibrand (incumbent)	4,056,931	66.96%	−5.23%
Republican	Chele Chiavacci Farley	1,730,439	28.56%	+5.84%
Conservative	Chele Chiavacci Farley	246,171	4.06%	+0.45%
Reform	Chele Chiavacci Farley	21,610	0.36%	N/A
Total	Chele Chiavacci Farley	1,998,220	32.98%	+6.65%
Write ins	Write ins	3,872	0.06%	
Total votes		6,059,023	100.00%	N/A
Democratic hold				

==== By county ====
County	Kirsten Gillibrand Democratic		Chele Farley Republican		Various candidates Other parties		Margin		Total votes cast
County	#	%	#	%	#	%	#	%	Total votes cast
Albany	78,115	68.1%	36,456	31.8%	124	0.1%	41,659	36.3%	114,695
Allegany	5,460	37.1%	9,261	62.9%	3	0.0%	−3,801	−25.8%	14,724
Bronx	257,723	91.7%	23,033	8.2%	168	0.1%	234,690	83.5%	280,924
Broome	41,145	57.1%	30,897	42.9%	48	0.1%	10,248	14.2%	72,090
Cattaraugus	10,431	44.0%	13,256	56.0%	5	0.0%	−2,825	−12.0%	23,692
Cayuga	13,823	51.1%	13,232	48.9%	9	0.0%	591	2.2%	27,064
Chautauqua	20,810	48.2%	22,361	51.8%	13	0.0%	−1,551	−3.6%	43,184
Chemung	14,347	49.0%	14,902	50.9%	14	0.1%	−555	−1.9%	29,263
Chenango	7,286	44.7%	8,996	55.2%	10	0.1%	−1,710	−10.5%	16,292
Clinton	15,930	61.4%	10,012	38.6%	2	0.0%	5,918	22.8%	25,944
Columbia	18,137	62.1%	11,055	37.8%	21	0.1%	7,082	24.3%	29,213
Cortland	9,113	56.2%	7,099	43.8%	11	0.1%	2,014	12.4%	16,223
Delaware	7,871	46.4%	9,066	53.5%	9	0.1%	−1,195	−7.1%	16,946
Dutchess	63,675	57.4%	47,268	42.6%	48	0.0%	16,407	14.8%	110,991
Erie	206,024	61.7%	127,860	38.3%	0	0.0%	78,164	23.4%	333,884
Essex	8,294	59.7%	5,591	40.2%	7	0.1%	2,703	19.5%	13,892
Franklin	8,245	59.6%	5,576	40.3%	2	0.1%	2,669	19.3%	13,823
Fulton	6,896	41.3%	9,790	58.7%	4	0.0%	−2,894	−17.4%	16,690
Genesee	8,149	39.3%	12,552	60.6%	10	0.1%	−4,403	−21.3%	20,711
Greene	8,944	46.5%	10,293	53.5%	14	0.0%	−1,349	−7.0%	19,251
Hamilton	1,078	39.3%	1,662	60.6%	2	0.1%	−584	−21.3%	2,742
Herkimer	9,395	44.4%	11,742	55.5%	9	0.1%	−2,347	−11.1%	21,146
Jefferson	14,741	49.7%	14,884	50.2%	15	0.1%	−143	−0.5%	29,640
Kings	542,736	86.2%	85,973	13.7%	663	0.1%	456,763	72.5%	629,372
Lewis	3,707	42.0%	5,120	58.0%	3	0.0%	−1,413	−16.0%	8,830
Livingston	11,311	46.9%	12,782	53.0%	7	0.1%	−1,471	−6.1%	24,100
Madison	12,817	49.8%	12,894	50.1%	24	0.1%	-77	-0.3%	25,735
Monroe	174,788	62.4%	105,198	37.6%	111	0.0%	69,590	24.8%	280,097
Montgomery	7,024	46.3%	8,131	53.6%	6	0.1%	−1,107	−7.3%	15,161
Nassau	294,186	58.9%	104,875	41.0%	184	0.1%	89,311	17.9%	499,245
New York	481,779	89.8%	53,813	10.0%	768	0.2%	427,966	79.8%	536,360
Niagara	35,225	49.4%	36,088	50.6%	29	0.0%	-863	-1.2%	71,342
Oneida	38,613	50.7%	37,446	49.2%	28	0.1%	1,167	1.5%	76,087
Onondaga	109,201	62.1%	66,599	37.9%	145	0.0%	42,602	24.2%	175,945
Ontario	23,126	52.9%	20,543	47.0%	14	0.1%	2,583	5.9%	43,683
Orange	67,701	56.2%	52,640	43.7%	36	0.1%	15,061	12.5%	120,377
Orleans	4,545	36.2%	7,999	63.7%	4	0.1%	−3,454	−27.5%	12,548
Oswego	17,717	46.3%	20,499	53.6%	14	0.1%	-2,782	-7.3%	38,230
Otsego	11,453	53.4%	9,969	46.5%	7	0.1%	1,484	6.9%	21,429
Putnam	19,103	49.8%	19,222	50.1%	8	0.1%	−119	−0.3%	38,333
Queens	398,414	81.5%	89,810	18.4%	415	0.1%	308,604	63.1%	488,639
Rensselaer	34,680	57.2%	25,964	42.8%	24	0.0%	8,716	14.4%	60,668
Richmond	71,175	52.1%	65,375	47.8%	116	0.1%	5,800	4.3%	136,666
Rockland	59,386	59.9%	39,730	40.1%	58	0.0%	19,656	19.8%	99,174
Saratoga	52,523	54.9%	43,114	45.1%	12	0.0%	9,409	9.8%	95,649
Schenectady	32,735	59.8%	22,005	40.2%	37	0.0%	10,730	19.6%	54,777
Schoharie	5,355	44.3%	6,726	55.7%	5	0.0%	−1,371	−11.4%	12,086
Schuyler	3,440	47.0%	3,868	52.9%	6	0.1%	−428	−5.9%	7,314
Seneca	5,997	52.2%	5,484	47.7%	10	0.1%	513	4.5%	11,491
St. Lawrence	17,970	55.8%	14,201	44.1%	5	0.1%	3,769	11.7%	32,176
Steuben	13,868	41.2%	19,776	58.8%	6	0.0%	−5,908	−17.6%	33,650
Suffolk	289,528	54.7%	239,477	45.3%	145	0.0%	50,051	9.4%	529,150
Sullivan	12,937	53.3%	11,319	46.6%	14	0.1%	1,618	6.7%	24,270
Tioga	8,002	44.0%	10,188	56.0%	8	0.0%	−2,186	−12.0%	18,198
Tompkins	28,818	77.2%	8,399	22.5%	111	0.3%	20,419	54.7%	37,328
Ulster	50,163	64.6%	27,410	35.3%	45	0.1%	22,753	29.3%	77,618
Warren	14,634	56.8%	11,118	43.2%	7	0.0%	3,516	13.6%	25,759
Washington	10,465	51.3%	9,940	48.7%	5	0.0%	525	2.6%	20,410
Wayne	13,931	44.3%	17,522	55.7%	12	0.0%	−3,591	−11.4%	31,465
Westchester	234,173	70.7%	96,978	29.3%	226	0.0%	137,195	41.4%	331,377
Wyoming	4,330	32.9%	8,837	67.1%	3	0.0%	−4,507	−34.2%	13,170
Yates	3,743	46.3%	4,344	53.7%	3	0.0%	−601	−7.4%	8,090
Totals	4,056,931	66.96%	1,998,220	32.98%	3,872	0.06%	2,058,711	33.98%	6,509,023

Counties that flipped from Democratic to Republican

- Cattaraugus (largest municipality: Olean)
- Chautauqua (largest municipality: Jamestown)
- Chemung (largest municipality: Elmira)
- Chenango (largest municipality: Norwich)
- Delaware (largest municipality: Sidney)
- Fulton (largest municipality: Gloversville)
- Genesee (largest municipality: Batavia)
- Greene (largest municipality: Catskill)
- Hamilton (largest municipality: Long Lake)
- Herkimer (largest municipality: German Flatts)
- Jefferson (largest municipality: Le Ray)
- Lewis (largest municipality: Lowville)
- Livingston (largest municipality: Geneseo)
- Madison (largest municipality: Oneida)
- Montgomery (largest municipality: Amsterdam)
- Niagara (largest municipality: Niagara Falls)
- Orleans (largest municipality: Albion)
- Oswego (largest municipality: Oswego)
- Putnam (largest municipality: Lake Carmel)
- Steuben (largest municipality: Corning)
- Schoharie (largest municipality: Cobleskill)
- Schuyler (largest municipality: Watkins Glen)
- Tioga (largest municipality: Waverly)
- Wayne (largest municipality: Newark)
- Yates (largest municipality: Penn Yan)

==== By congressional district ====
Gillibrand won 26 of 27 congressional districts, including five that elected Republicans.

District	Gillibrand	Farley	Representative
1st	53%	47%	Lee Zeldin
2nd	54%	46%	Peter T. King
3rd	59%	41%	Thomas Suozzi
4th	60%	40%	Kathleen Rice
5th	90%	10%	Gregory Meeks
6th	72%	28%	Grace Meng
7th	92%	8%	Nydia Velázquez
8th	90%	10%	Hakeem Jeffries
9th	89%	11%	Yvette Clarke
10th	84%	16%	Jerry Nadler
11th	55%	45%	Max Rose
12th	87%	13%	Carolyn Maloney
13th	95%	5%	Adriano Espaillat
14th	84%	16%	Alexandria Ocasio Cortez
15th	96%	4%	Jose E. Serrano
16th	79%	21%	Eliot Engel
17th	66%	34%	Nita Lowey
18th	57%	43%	Sean Patrick Maloney
19th	56%	44%	Antonio Delgado
20th	63%	37%	Paul Tonko
21st	53%	47%	Elise Stefanik
22nd	51%	49%	Anthony Brindisi
23rd	51%	49%	Tom Reed
24th	58%	42%	John Katko
25th	63%	37%	Joe Morelle
26th	68%	32%	Brian Higgins
27th	47%	53%	Chris Collins
