= Moran Township =

Moran Township may refer to:

- Moran Township, Michigan
- Moran Township, Todd County, Minnesota
- Moran Township, Richland County, North Dakota, in Richland County, North Dakota
