= Morán =

Morán is a Spanish surname. Notable people with the surname include:

- Carlos Morán, footballer
- Carolina Morán, model
- Fátima Leyva Morán, footballer
- Fernando Morán (politician) (1926–2020), Spanish diplomat and politician
- Fernando Morán (footballer) (born 1976), Spanish footballer
- Fernando Navarro Morán, footballer
- Francisco Morán, outfielder/catcher
- Gregorio Morán (1947–2026), Spanish journalist and writer
- Héctor Morán, footballer
- Humberto Fernández-Morán, scientist
- Jorge Morán, footballer
- José Manuel Mijares Morán, singer
- José Trinidad Morán, Venezuelan militar
- Jovani Morán (born 1997), Puerto Rican baseball player
- Manolo Morán, actor
- María Margarita Morán, beauty pageant participant
- Mario Morán (born 1992), Mexican actor
- Mercedes Morán, actress
- Nitza Morán (born 1970), Puerto Rican politician
- Pedro Escartín Morán, footballer
- Rolando Morán, freedom fighter
- Rubén Morán, footballer
- Ruberth Morán, footballer

== See also ==
- Morán Municipality in Venezuela
- Moran (disambiguation)
- Morin (disambiguation)
