= Kiltiernan Church =

- Cill Tiarnáin
- Location within Ireland
- 53.188048°N 8.843033°W
- Location: Kiltiernan East, Kilcolgan, County Galway
- Country: Ireland
- Denomination: Celtic Christianity

Architecture
- Functional status: inactive
- Architectural type: Celtic Christianity
- Years built: 8th century

Specifications
- Length: 16 m (52 ft)
- Width: 4 m (13 ft)
- Materials: stone

Administration
- Diocese: Galway

National monument of Ireland
- Official name: Kiltiernan
- Reference no.: 446

Kiltiernan Church is a medieval church and National Monument in County Galway, Ireland.

== Location ==
Kiltiernan Church is located 2.9 km (1.8 miles) south-southeast of Kilcolgan, east of Tullynafrankagh Lough.

== History ==
There are no written records of Kiltiernan. It is believed to have been founded by a Saint Tiernan in the 5th century AD, with the surviving stone church dating to the 8th century.

When it was excavated, an enclosure wall not parallel to the church was found.

== Buildings ==
A stone church with a flat-headed trabeate doorway, sloping jambs and single lintel; and a chancel added later. The east window is triangle-headed and formed of two stones.

The enclosure covers 1.55 hectares (3.8 acres). The outlines of over 20 structures (mostly house-sites) can be discerned as mounds, and over 16 sub-enclosures.

== See also ==
- Kilternan, County Dublin
