= Platypodia alcocki =

Scientific classification
- Domain: Eukaryota
- Kingdom: Animalia
- Phylum: Arthropoda
- Class: Malacostraca
- Order: Decapoda
- Suborder: Pleocyemata
- Infraorder: Brachyura
- Family: Xanthidae
- Genus: Platypodia
- Species: P. alcocki

Binomial name
- Platypodia alcocki Buitendijk, 1941

Species of crab

Platypodia alcocki is a species of crab.
