= Morini (disambiguation) =

Morini is an ancient Belgic tribe.

Morini may also refer to:

== People ==
- Alfonsina Morini (1891-1959), Italian cyclist
- Alfonso Morini, the founder of Moto Morini
- Emanuele Morini (born 1982), Italian football player
- Erika Morini (1904–1995), Austrian violinist
- Francesco Morini (1944–2021), Italian football player
- Giorgio Morini (born 1947), Italian midfielder
- Giovanni Morini (born 1995), Italian ice hockey player
- Guido Morini (born 1959), Italian pianist, organist, harpsichordist, musicologist and composer
- Massimo Morini, driver in the 2008 FIA GT Championship

== Biology ==
- Agdistis morini, a moth in the family Pterophoridae
- Ecyroschema morini, a species of beetle in the family Cerambycidae
- Elattoneura morini, a damselfly species in the genus Elattoneura
- Euphaedra morini , a butterfly in the family Nymphalidae
- Homelix morini, a species of beetle in the family Cerambycidae
- Platypodia morini, a crab species in the genus Platypodia

== Other uses ==
- Morini (manufacturer), a Swiss (previously Italian) manufacturer of target pistols
- Moto Morini, Italian maker of motorcycles

== See also ==
- Morin (disambiguation)
- Moreno (disambiguation)
