= Kilcolgan =

Village in County Galway, Ireland

Kilcolgan Cill Cholgáin
- Village
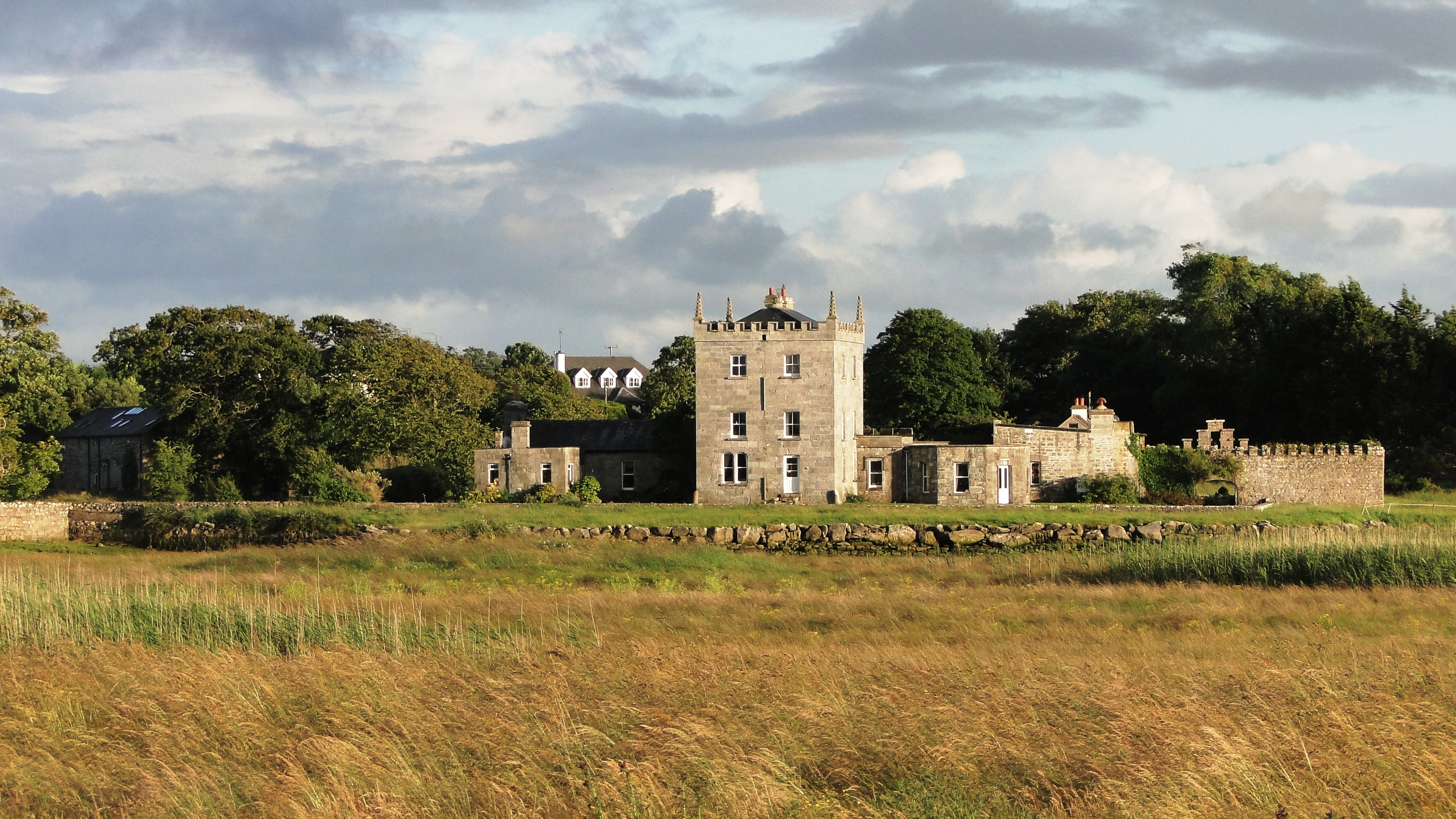
- Kilcolgan Castle

- Location in Ireland
- Coordinates: 53°12′45″N 8°52′21″W
- Country: Ireland
- Province: Connacht
- County: County Galway

Population (2022)
  - Total: 194
- Time zone: UTC+0 (WET)
  - Summer (DST): UTC-1 (IST (WEST))
- Irish Grid Reference: M409203

Kilcolgan (Irish: Cill Cholgáin, meaning 'Colgan's church'), is a village on the mouth of the Kilcolgan River at Dunkellin Bay in County Galway, Ireland. The settlement is at the junction of the N67 and R458 roads, which lies between Gort and Clarinbridge. The village is near the site of the Galway Bay drowning tragedy. Kilcolgan was designated as a census town by the Central Statistics Office for the first time in the 2016 census, at which time it had a population of 141 people. The population was 194 at the 2022 census. The village is in a townland and civil parish of the same name.

== Places of interest ==
- Tyrone House, a ruined manor house
- Kilcolgan Bridge, late 18th-century stone bridge
- Kilcolgan Castle, Gothic Revival country house
- St Sourney (Sairnait)'s church and well, a religious site dating from the 6th Century with an 11th-century gothic carved doorway, a 19th-century mausoleum (celebrated by the British poet Sir John Betjeman) and adjoining graveyard.
- Moran's Oyster Cottage, historic restaurant located in a traditional thatched cottage, established in the 1760s.
- Kiltiernan Church, medieval church and a National Monument

== See also ==
- Galway Bay
- List of abbeys and priories in the Republic of Ireland § County Galway
- List of towns and villages in Ireland
