= William Womack Heath =

American lawyer, educator and diplomat

William Womack Heath (December 7, 1903 – June 22, 1971) was an American lawyer, educator, and diplomat.

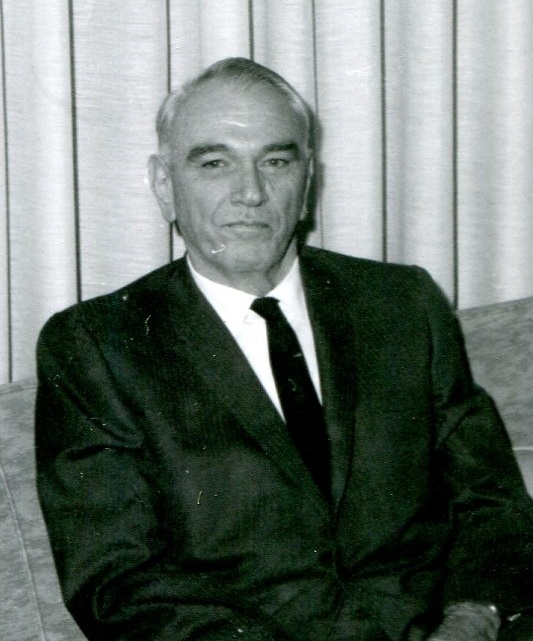
Ambassador Heath at the Stockholm embassy in 1967

== Personal background ==
William W. Heath was born in Normangee, Texas, to John Al and Runie (Née Hill) Heath. On July 14, 1929, William Womack Heath married Mavis Barnett (February 14, 1908—April 9, 1998). The couple remained married until William's death in 1971, after which Mavis remarried to David Harold Byrd on her birthday, February 14, 1974.

== Career ==
As a young man, Heath attended the University of Texas law school. He was elected county attorney of Grimes County. After admission to the state bar in the fall of 1924, Heath served two terms as county attorney (1925–29) and one term as county judge (1931–32). In 1933 he was appointed secretary of state by Governor Miriam A. Ferguson. He served as assistant attorney general under Governor James V. Allred from 1935 to 1937. Heath retired to privately practice insurance law in 1937. In 1950 he purchased Circle Bar Ranch in Blanco County near the property of his long-time friend Lyndon B. Johnson.

Heath reentered public service in 1952, when Governor Price Daniel appointed him chairman of the Texas Board of State Hospitals and Special Schools. In 1959 he was named to the board of regents of the University of Texas, which he served as chairman from 1962 to 1966.

In August 1965, Heath proposed the establishment of the Lyndon B. Johnson Presidential Library in Austin, Texas.

== Ambassador to Sweden ==
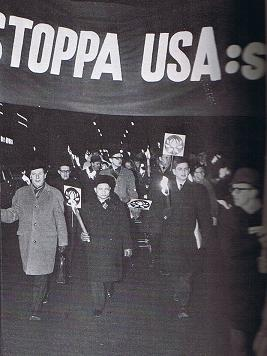
Olof Palme demonstrating side by side with North Vietnam ambassador Nguyen Tho Chyan on February 21, 1968 in Stockholm.

On March 22, 1967, Heath accepted Johnson's appointment as ambassador to Sweden. On March 8, 1968, however, he was recalled to the United States in a demonstration of American displeasure with Swedish education minister Olof Palme's participation in an anti-Vietnam War protest that took place on February 21. Heath left Sweden on March 12 and didn't return until April 17. On January 23, 1969, Heath finally left Sweden, just a few days after Richard Nixon was sworn in as president. The U.S. would not appoint a new ambassador to Sweden until 1970 when Jerome H. Holland was appointed.

== Sources ==
- William Womack Heath on Texas State Historical Association

Diplomatic posts
Preceded by J. Graham Parsons	U.S. Ambassador to Sweden; 1967-1969	Succeeded by None, tense diplomatic relations (Jerome H. Holland)
