= Moran Dam =

- Location of the proposed dam in Canada
- Country: Canada
- Location: Near Lillooet, British Columbia
- Coordinates: 50°55′26″N 121°52′11″W
- Status: Proposed
- Construction began: 1955
- Opening date: Never
- Construction cost: US$ 4.15 billion (Note: Adjusted for inflation from a figure of $500 million in 1952 dollars.) (projected)

Dam and spillways
- Type of dam: Concrete thick arch
- Impounds: Fraser River
- Height: 261 m (856 ft)
- Length: 950 m (3,120 ft) (Note: Measured along the 460 m contour on Canadian topo maps of the Fraser River canyon at the site assuming a straight-axis construction.)

Reservoir
- Total capacity: 35.4 km^{3} (28,700,000 acre⋅ft)
- Catchment area: 146,500 km^{2} (56,600 sq mi) (Note: Catchment area is estimated from the Water Survey of Canada's "Fraser River at Big Bar Creek" gauge on the Fraser River, the closest one (about 30 km (19 mi) upstream) to the Moran Dam site with a drainage area measurement.)
- Maximum length: 260 km (160 mi)
- Normal elevation: 460 m (1,510 ft) (Note: The elevation of the river at the dam site is 240 m (790 ft). The maximum depth of the reservoir would be 220 m (720 ft).)

Power Station
- Hydraulic head: 220 m (720 ft)
- Installed capacity: 14,000 MW
- Capacity factor: 23.97% (Note: Calculated from the average annual production of 30 billion KWh.)
- Annual generation: 30 billion KWh (Note: Amount estimated by adding the net annual generation of Grand Coulee Dam (21 billion KWh) with twice the annual generation of Hoover Dam (8.4 billion KWh).)

Moran Dam, also called High Moran Dam or Moran Canyon Dam, was a 1950s proposal to dam the Fraser River in the Canadian province of British Columbia (BC). The structure was planned in the wake of devastating floods in a time of rapidly growing power demand, and if built, would have powered the largest hydroelectric facility in North America. After a protracted environmental battle, Moran Dam was defeated in 1972, mainly over concerns of its adverse impact on salmon populations in the Fraser River basin. The shelving of the project also influenced cancellation of other hydro developments along the river, and today the Fraser remains one of the most productive salmon fisheries on the continent.

== Proposal ==
As early as 1934, the Moran Canyon site was identified as an excellent location for a large hydroelectric dam. During the dam-building era of the mid-20th century, up to five major hydropower projects were proposed on the main stem of the Fraser River. The largest of these, a dam near the railway point of Moran, some 20 kilometres (12 mi) upstream of Lillooet, was put forth by the Moran Development Corporation (MDC). This American firm put forth US$500 million in 1952 to finance the construction of the dam, which would have been the tallest in the world. The Fraser River was favoured over other large rivers in BC, such as the Columbia or Peace, because of its relative proximity to urban centres like Vancouver.

The dam would have been 261 metres (856 ft) high, generating as much power on average as Grand Coulee Dam and two Hoover Dams combined. Much of this energy would have been sold to the northwestern United States. It would form a gigantic reservoir 260 kilometres (160 mi) long, containing some 35.4 cubic kilometres (28,700,000 acre⋅ft) of water at maximum pool, reaching almost to the city of Quesnel. A significant portion of this capacity would be reserved for flood control as the dam had been proposed in the wake of major floods that occurred just three years before then, in 1948. The BC government gave MDC clearance to begin preliminary work at the site in 1955. However, MDC lacked the funds to build such a gigantic dam and to acquire all the lands that would be flooded under the reservoir, and a rival company, BC Electric (today part of BC Hydro), acquired similar rights to the site that same year.

== Controversy and defeat ==
…the economic cost of destroyed salmon runs would make the power produced by Moran Dam too expensive.

— from Salmon Without Rivers: A History of the Pacific Salmon Crisis

Moran Dam's tremendous height would make artificial fish passage nearly impossible, and would thus cut off a large portion of the Fraser's prodigious runs of Pacific salmon and steelhead trout. During the later 1950s and 1960s, determined opposition from environmentalists including Roderick Haig-Brown, fishermen and others stalled the project, citing that the dam would block access to over 70% of anadromous fish spawning habitat in the Fraser basin. In addition, it would cause losses of up to 50% of catches along the main stem Fraser and its delta below the dam because of sediment blockage, water temperature changes, and flow fluctuations. The defeat of the dam project, which had one of the largest power potentials of any in North America, uniquely occurred during the height of the continent's dam-building era, before determined environmentalist opposition towards dams such as at New Melones, twenty years later. (Note: During the 1950s, there was also a fight over the proposed Echo Park Dam in Utah in the United States, perhaps one of the most famous dam controversies of all time. However, the conflict was mainly because said dam would have been inside the Dinosaur National Monument. The Moran Dam site was not federally protected, nor was wilderness.)

In 1970, BC Hydro released a report that predicted annual provincial rises in power consumption of over 10 percent. As a result, the proposed dam project was briefly revived, to the point at which test bores were made at the site in May of that year. After continuing concern over what the dam would do to the Fraser's salmon runs, the Moran Dam was defeated again in 1972. The downfall of the Moran project led to decreased call for power generation on the Fraser River, as Moran would have been the key facility for that matter. If Moran Dam had been built, the vast construction could open much of the Fraser River for development, to the point where it might have even ended up like the dam-straitjacketed Columbia River. Today, despite its alluring hydroelectric potential, the Fraser River remains one of the longest undammed rivers in North America and one of the continent's most productive salmon fisheries.

== See also ==
- Kemano, British Columbia
- Kenney Dam
- Moran (disambiguation)

== Works cited ==
- Evenden, Matthew Dominic (2004). Fish versus power: an environmental history of the Fraser River. Cambridge University Press. ISBN 0-521-83099-0.
- Lichatowich, Jim; Lichatowich, James A. (2001). Salmon Without Rivers: A History of the Pacific Salmon Crisis. Island Press. ISBN 1-55963-361-1.
- McGillivray, Brett (2000). Geography of British Columbia: people and landscapes in transition. UBC Press. ISBN 0-7748-0785-7.
