= Landtag of North Rhine-Westphalia =

State parliament (Landtag) of North Rhine-Westphalia, Germany

Coordinates: 51.219°N 6.764°E

Landtag of North Rhine-Westphalia Landtag Nordrhein-Westfalen
- Landtag of North Rhine-Westphalia Logo

Type
- Type: Landtag
- Term limits: 5 years
- Established: 2 October 1946

Leadership
- President: André Kuper, CDU since 01 June 2017
- First Vice President: Rainer Schmeltzer, SPD; 1June 2022
- Second Vice President: Berivan Aymaz, Greens; 1June 2022
- Third Vice President: Christof Rasche, FDP; 1June 2022

Structure
- Seats: 195
- Political groups: Government (115) CDU (76) Greens (39) Opposition (80) SPD (56) FDP (12) AfD (12)

Elections
- Last election: 15 May 2022
- Next election: 2027

Meeting place
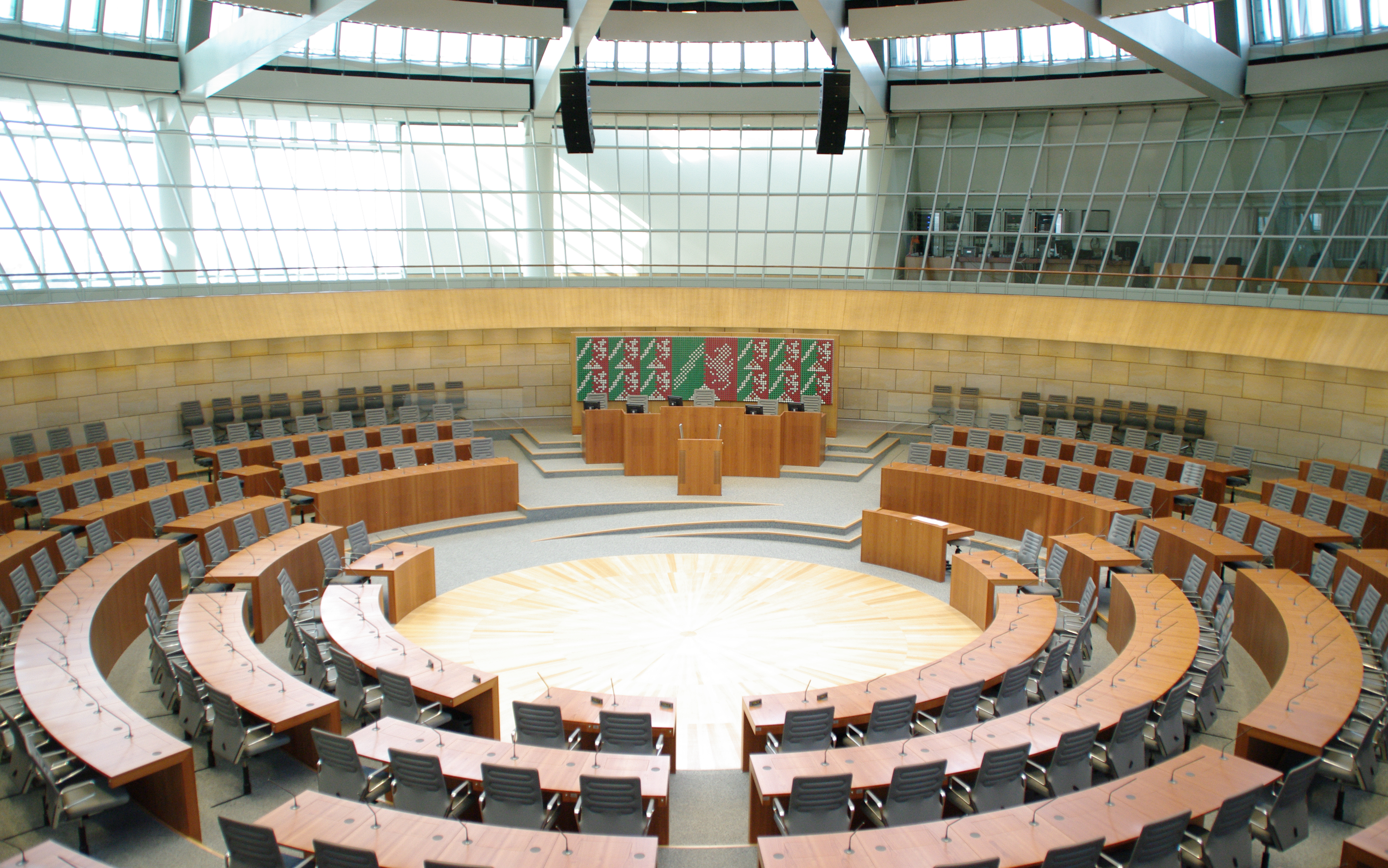

Website
- www.landtag.nrw.de

The Landtag of North Rhine-Westphalia is the state parliament (Landtag) of the German state of North Rhine-Westphalia, which convenes in the state capital of Düsseldorf, in the eastern part of the district of Hafen. The parliament is the central legislative body in the political system of North Rhine-Westphalia. In addition to the passage of laws, its most important tasks are the election of the Minister-President of the state and the administration of the government. The current government is a coalition of the CDU and the Greens, supporting the cabinet of Minister-President Hendrik Wüst since June 2022.

The most recent state election took place on 15 May 2022.

== Legislature ==
The State Parliament's position in the government

The State Parliament is the central legislative body of the state. It establishes or changes laws that fall within its legislative authority, which includes the regulation of education, police matters, and municipal law.

=== Legislative process ===
Bills can be brought before the parliament by a parliamentary group (caucus) or a group of at least seven members of parliament. Additionally, the state government itself can bring relevant bill proposals to parliament for consideration. In practice, most bill proposals originate from the government. These generally are detailed proposals submitted in writing. They are first read and heavily discussed in a plenary assembly open to all members of parliament, before being given over to a specific committee (or sometimes more than one) that is organized around a relevant subject matter and will therefore provide specific counseling on the matter. If necessary, the bill proposal will also be delivered to external experts that are in contact with lobby groups, and to those who will be directly affected by the bill's passage. The specific parliamentary committees will then pass the reformulated bill with recommended decisions back to the parliament at large for a second reading. At this stage, members of parliament again make suggestions regarding the bill. Each member has the ability to make suggestions to change the bill, and afterwards, the assembly will vote on each proposed amendment individually before finally voting on the entire bill.

Bills are enacted by majority vote, as the constitution does not require any more stringent criteria for passage. The parliament operates by a quorum decision-making process, meaning that only half of its legal members must be present. Constitutional amendments and the budget must go through the advisory process three times, instead of the standard two. For any proposed legislature, a third reading, deliberation, or committee counseling can be requested either by a party or by at least a quarter of the assembly. The president of the parliament delivers each ratified law to the Minister-President, who signs and disseminates it as part of her duties as head of state for North Rhine-Westphalia. The law enters into force after it is written in the Law and Ordinance Record for the State of North Rhine-Westphalia (Gesetz- und Verordnungsblatt für das Land Nordrhein-Westfalen).

=== Petitions and referendums ===
Referendums in Germany are similar to bill proposals from parliament and the state government in that they can be submitted by the people to parliament to undergo the same legislative process. If parliament rejects the referendum, then a plebiscite is undertaken in which the people at large can vote. A successful plebiscite leads to the referendum being passed as law. A plebiscite can also be enacted at the request of the government, if parliament fails to pass one of their proposed bills. In practice, this form of direct democracy does not play a large role in the legislative process.

=== Limitations of legislative authority ===
The authority of the state parliament in numerous legal areas has waned in the last few decades. This is due to the overriding legal authority of the federal government in Berlin. Indeed, while the Federal Reforms of 2006 more clearly defined the legal authorities of both federal and state governments, especially with regards to each other, it has also led to greater legislative activity by the federal government in many areas, which has in turn narrowed the field of authority possessed by the states. The European Union likewise has a strong influence on the passage of laws at the national level. Other than the direct participation of the state President-Ministers in the Bundesrat of Germany, the states have no direct contact with the European Union. However, through the Bundesrat, each state has a direct say in national matters, including those that involve the EU.

=== Election of minister-presidents ===
As stated in Article 51 of the State Constitution, the State Parliament of North Rhine-Westphalia elects the minister-president of North Rhine-Westphalia "from its center" ("aus seiner Mitte") in a secret election that requires at least half of parliament's legally-seated members to vote in favor. Therefore, the Minister-President must always first be a member of parliament. If a majority of affirmative votes is not reached in the first vote, a second (and possibly third) vote is held within 14 days, with whoever winning a simple majority becoming Minister-President. If no such majority results, a runoff vote between two nominees takes place. The winner of this vote then becomes Minister-President. Abstentions and invalid votes do not count as votes cast. Thus far, the Minister-President has always been approved in the first vote, with the exceptions of the reelection of Franz Meyers on 25 July 1966 and the election of Hannelore Kraft on 14 July 2010, both of whom were elected in the second round of voting. The removal of the Minister-President is possible at any time through a motion of no confidence, which requires a majority of dissenting votes. As of 2013, there have been two successful votes of no confidence on the State Parliament of North Rhine-Westphalia (the first on 20 February 1956 and the second on 8 December 1966). Parliament has no direct influence on the appointment or dismissal of other state ministers, who (together with the Minister-President) make up the government. A vote of no confidence dissolves the government and therefore automatically dismisses all state ministers.

Provided that no single party wins an absolute majority, a coalition is formed in most cases between several parties whose members together make up a majority of parliament and who can, therefore, easily elect an agreed upon Minister-President. Occasionally the governing coalition is a minority government. The Minister-President, in most cases, puts the government together with people from the coalition parties. In practice, the election of a Minister-President leads to a stable government with a clear majority that can exert considerable influence over the legislative process and thus pursue its own legislative agenda.

Though the electorate does not vote directly for the Minister-President, the selected person is generally a dominant figure in the state political system, and since the larger parties declare their lead candidate before the election, voting for a particular party means voting in favor of having that lead candidate be in the running for President-Minister. The lead candidate for smaller coalition parties are regularly included in the government as ministers.

=== Control of the government ===
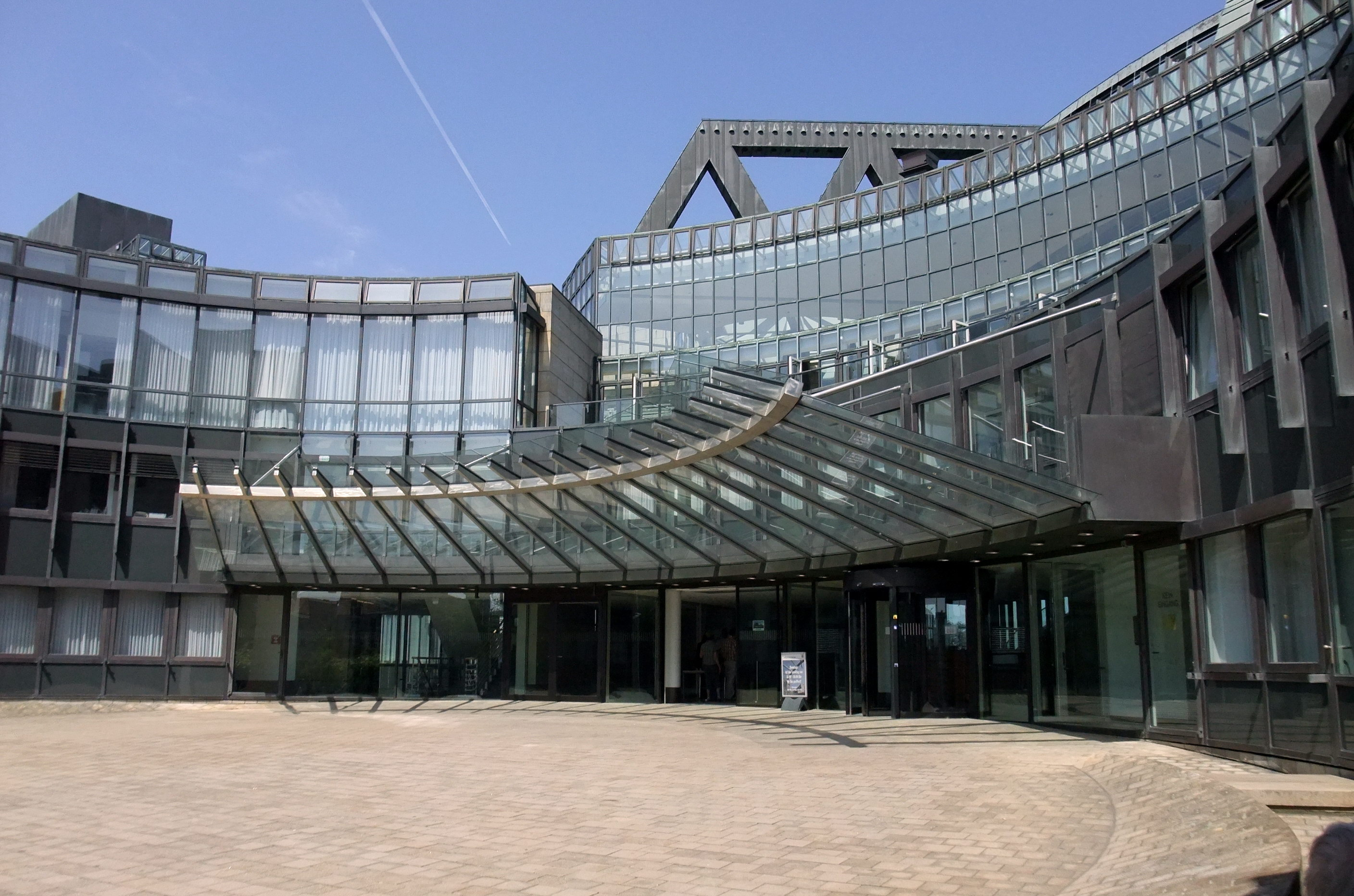
Entrance area

Compared to the state government, the state parliament has extensive powers. It can call members of government in for questioning before parliament, and it has the power to approve the state budget proposed by the government. Parliament also votes on closed states contracts. And, as mentioned above, parliament has the power to dissolve the government through a motion of no confidence. The Court of Audit controls the use of state funds by all state governmental bodies. This court likewise controls the finances of the parliament, but it also reports to parliament, which elects the court's highest members.

=== Election of constitutional judges ===
Parliament elects four members of the Constitutional Court for the State of North Rhine-Westphalia (Verfassungsgerichtshof für das Land Nordrhein-Westfalen) to terms of six years each. Altogether this court has seven members. The long term of office, which is staggered so that each judge will not face reelection at the same time, ensures that parliament cannot place undue pressure on the court through election manipulation. This is meant to strengthen the independence of the judges on the court.

=== Election of members to the Federal Convention ===
While the state government appoints representatives to the Bundesrat at its own discretion, parliament elects the state's representatives to the Federal Convention. The number of representatives of each party present in the Federal Convention is dependent on how many representatives belonging to that party are in the state parliament. Based on population statistics, North Rhine-Westphalia is responsible for about a fifth of the members of the Federal Convention. Roughly half of these individuals are, by virtue of their membership in the federal parliament (Bundestag (Germany), already members of the Federal Convention. The state parliament fills all those seats designated to the state that remain.

== Organization ==
The majority of work by the parliament takes place in committees, rather than in plenary sessions (which include all parliament members). In general, members of the state parliament are career politicians and sit together according to what party they belong to. At the beginning of each legislative period, parliament members elect a Präsidium, which is headed by the president of the parliament (distinct from the minister-president), and a Council of Elders (Ältestenrat), which is essentially a board to help with managerial issues. It is also during this period that committee seats are filled.

=== President of the parliament ===
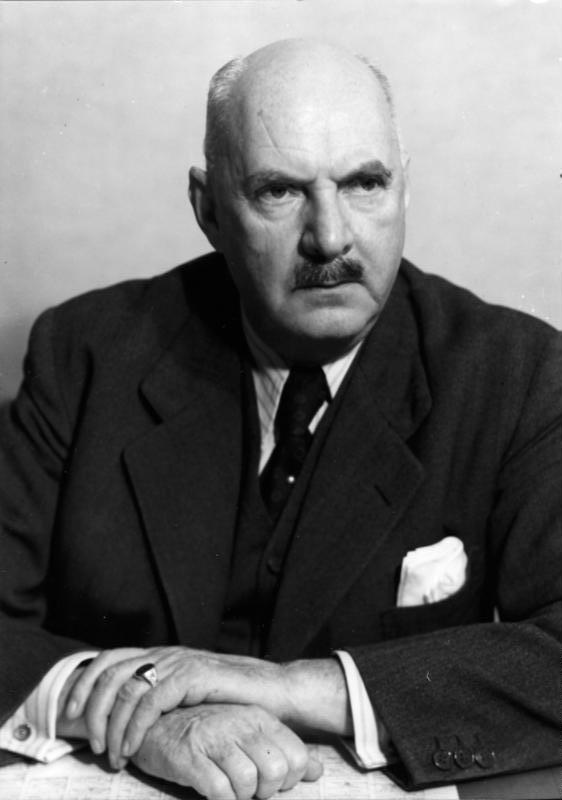
Robert Lehr

The Präsidium is headed by the president of the parliament (Landtagspräsident), who is chosen from among the ranks of parliament. In general, the president of the parliament comes from the largest constituent political party in the government. The following individuals have been parliament president:

President	Party	In office	
Ernst Gnoß	SPD	10/02/1946	12/19/1946
Robert Lehr	CDU	12/19/1946	04/19/1947
Josef Gockeln	CDU	04/19/1947	12/06/1958
Wilhelm Johnen	CDU	01/13/1959	04/19/1966
Josef Hermann Dufhues	CDU	04/19/1966	07/23/1966
John van Nes Ziegler	SPD	07/25/1966	07/25/1970
Wilhelm Lenz	CDU	07/27/1970	05/28/1980
John van Nes Ziegler	SPD	05/29/1980	05/29/1985
Karl Josef Denzer	SPD	05/30/1985	05/29/1990
Ingeborg Friebe	SPD	05/31/1990	05/31/1995
Ulrich Schmidt	SPD	06/01/1995	06/02/2005
Regina van Dinther	CDU	06/08/2005	06/09/2010
Edgar Moron (Note: After the parliament election on 9 May 2010, the election of the new president of the parliament did not occur until 13 July 2010. At an inaugural meeting on 9 June 2010, the outgoing President Regina van Dinther would have continued in her position, according to article 38, paragraph 2 of the Constitution of North Rhine Westphalia, which states: "The incumbent remains in office until a new Parliament President is elected." However, because she was no longer a member of the parliament, her term as Parliament President ended that day. The leadership of parliament was held from then until 13 July 2010 by first deputy Edgar Moron (SPD), who also was no longer a member of parliament, and the Vice-Presidents Oliver Keymis (GRÜNE) and Angela Freimuth (FDP). The delay of the election on 9 June 2010 was criticized as "parliamentary suicide".)	SPD	06/10/2010	07/13/2010
Eckhard Uhlenberg	CDU	07/13/2010	05/31/2012
Carina Gödecke	SPD	05/31/2012	06/01/2017
André Kuper	CDU	06/01/2017	present

== Members ==
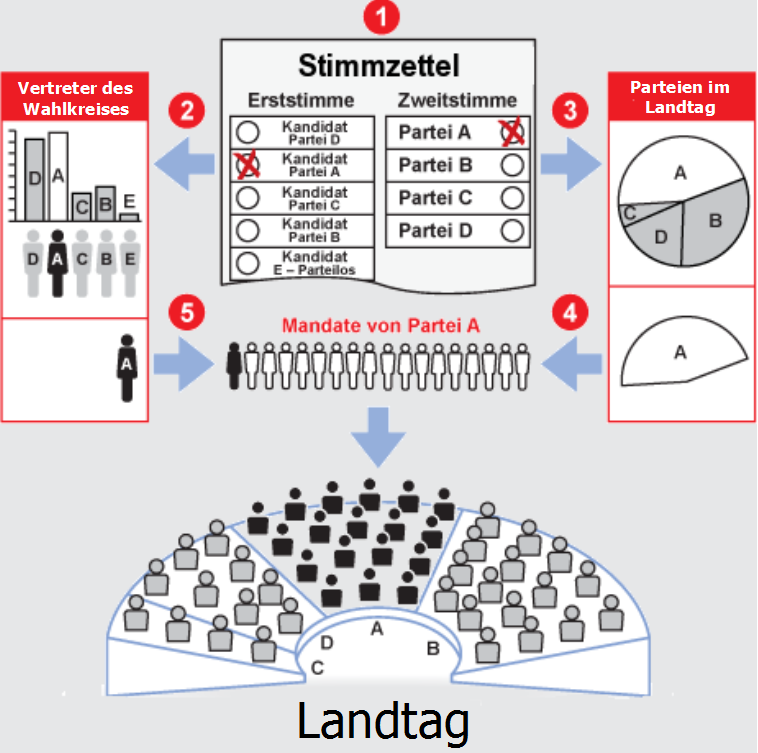
Diagram of the state election process. The election process in North Rhine-Westphalia basically follows the election process for the federal government.

=== Election ===
==== Overview ====
The Parliament of North Rhine-Westphalia is elected by a system of personalized proportional representation. Parliament members are selected by a universal, equal, direct, secret, and free vote. Parliament has at least 181 members. Additionally, the inclusion of overhang seats and leveling seats is possible. 128 members are elected by a direct mandate to represent specific constituencies. The remaining seats are allocated to candidates who appear on party lists. Each voter has two votes. The first vote is cast directly for a candidate to represent a specific district. The second vote is for a party and largely determines the relative size of each party's bloc in the new parliament.

==== Eligible voters ====
All Germans who have reached the age of 18, who live in North Rhine-Westphalia at least 16 days before the election, and who are not excluded from voting due to court decision are eligible to vote in the state parliamentary elections. If they have moved to the state between closing of the electoral rolls 35 days before the election and the eligibility cut-off 16 days before the election, they need to assert their right to vote by appealing to the voter registry in their new community. Those who wish to stand for office must be a registered resident of North Rhine-Westphalia for at least three months prior to the election. The state has 17,554,329 residents (as of 31 December 2012), of which about 13.2 million citizens have the right to vote.

==== Electoral districts ====
The state is divided into 128 electoral districts of approximately equal population. If an electoral district differs more than 20% from the average size, new borders are drawn up. Each electoral district is calculated to contain roughly 140,000 residents. In practice, each political district of the state (somewhat similar to county) is broken up into several overlapping electoral districts (with the exception of the district of Höxter and the district of Olpe). The division of the state into electoral districts is only relevant to the direct election of candidates with the first vote (as opposed to the second vote, which is specifically for party lists).

=== Nominations ===
Nominations for the election in each electoral district can come from parties, vote groups, and individual voters. Party lists can only be put up for a vote by the parties themselves. Nominations for individual candidates, as well as for party lists, must be submitted to the district's election registry no later than 6 pm on the 48th day before the election. This deadline can be shortened by resolution of the parliament. Parties that are not in the state parliament or have not been nominated to the Bundestag from North Rhine-Westphalia in the last electoral period must submit at least 1000 signatures from legal voters in support of the party. For district nominations, both parties as well as non-party potential candidates must submit at least 100 signatures from registered votes in support of their candidacy in the electoral district. Each voter is only allowed to support a single nomination, and a nomination is only permitted to name a single candidate, whose name must be the same as it is listed on the party list. Nominations from parties and electoral groups must be decided by secret ballot of their members or by delegates selected likewise by secret ballot; however the state leaderships of the parties have a unique right to appeal the decision of these nominations. If such an appeal is filed, the process must be repeated to either confirm the candidate or to select a new one. Through this rule, the leadership of the CDU successfully opposed a candidate in one of the electoral districts of Cologne during the parliamentary elections of 2005.

==== Election of direct candidates ====
The first vote that each voter casts is for a direct candidate to represent one of the 128 electoral districts. The winner of this vote enters the state parliament regardless of how the second vote (for the party list) turns out. Since 1954 only candidates from the two biggest parties, the CDU and the SPD, have been selected through the direct first vote. Theoretically, this directly elected member of parliament should represent all the residents of the electoral district, but in practice, their party membership plays a paramount role in their work in parliament. When a party receives more candidates by direct vote (the first vote) than they would be entitled to through the party list vote (the second vote), the extra candidates are said to occupy overhang seats (detailed below).

==== Distribution of seats in parliament ====
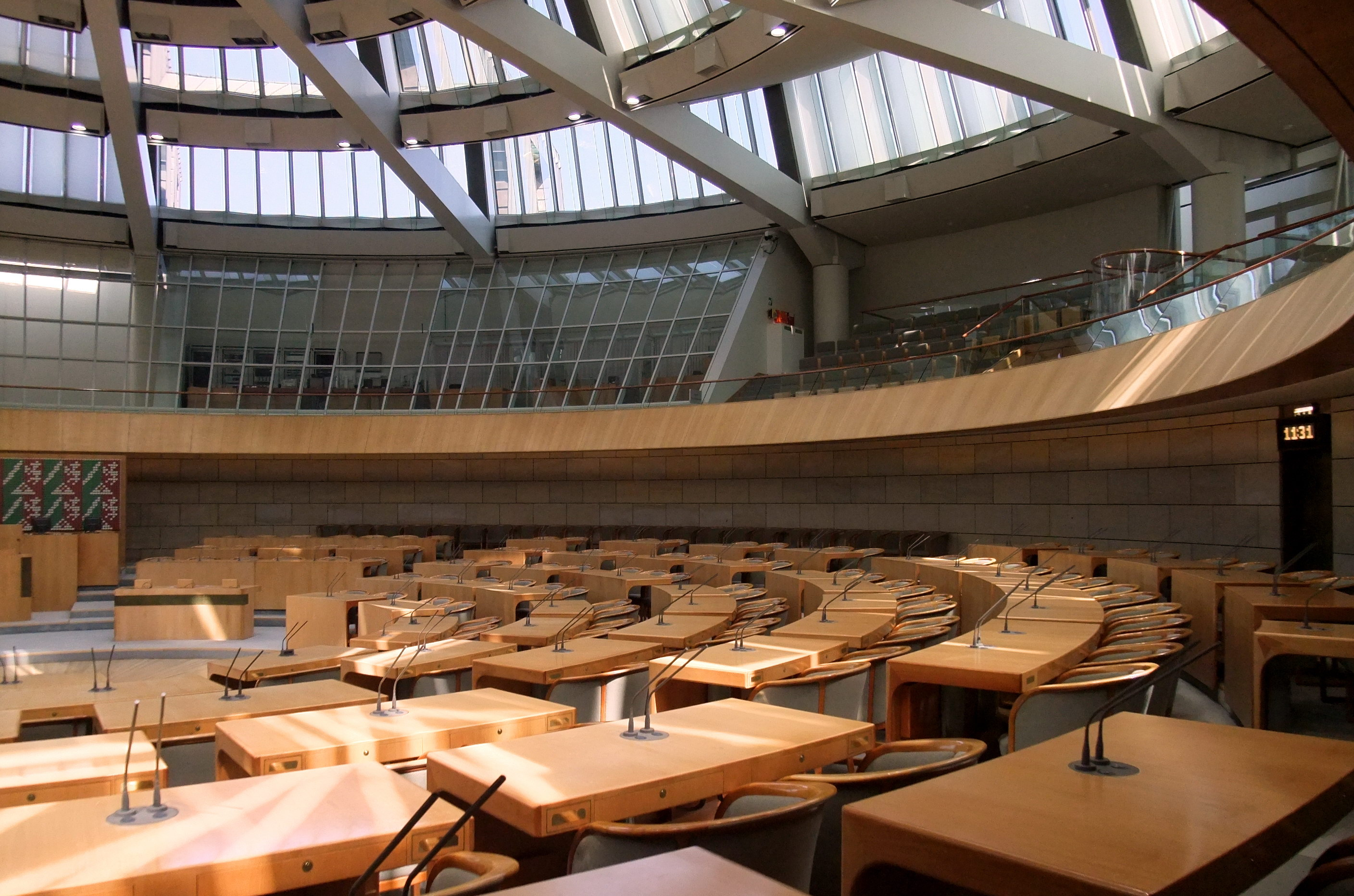
Plenary Chamber (before its renovation in 2012). The view is of the SPD seating area.

For the distribution of seats for each party, the second vote is of particular significance. In an effort to balance representation, the second vote is not counted when:

- The party voted for receives less than 5% of the valid votes cast, and
- when the voter's first vote is cast for a successful candidate who did not stand for election as a member of a party and is therefore not on a party list. These votes are disregarded because they would allow a voter both to elect a candidate directly and to vote for a separate group of politicians, effectively letting the voter elect more than one candidate.

Since the founding of the country, direct mandates have only gone to candidates of parties that received more than 5% of the votes. In addition to the 181 seats filled by the first vote, the remaining seats are divided based on the results of the second vote, using the Sainte-Laguë method and excluding those ruled out by the above listed rules. These seats are distributed to candidates among the winning parties in the order that they were listed in the party list.

With about 70% of their parliament members elected by direct mandate, North Rhine-Westphalia has the highest proportion of directly elected members of any state in Germany (with most of the others, as well as in the Federal Parliament, having only around 50% of their members elected directly). This means that a party often gets more seats to represent specific electoral districts than they are entitled to based on party list votes, which results in overhang seats. In this case, the other parties obtain leveling seats, in order to establish a proportional allocation of seats; the size of parliament, therefore, is not fixed, but rather expands in relation to the number of overhang and leveling seats. In theory, several parties can have overhang seats at the same time, though this has not yet occurred. Of course, this scheme for adding seats can lead to an expansion of parliament to a size larger than is necessary to produce proportional representation.

From 1985 until 2012 (with the exception of the 2010 elections), every parliamentary election had overhang seats so that parliament routinely had more representatives than the minimum number necessary.

==== Ballot ====
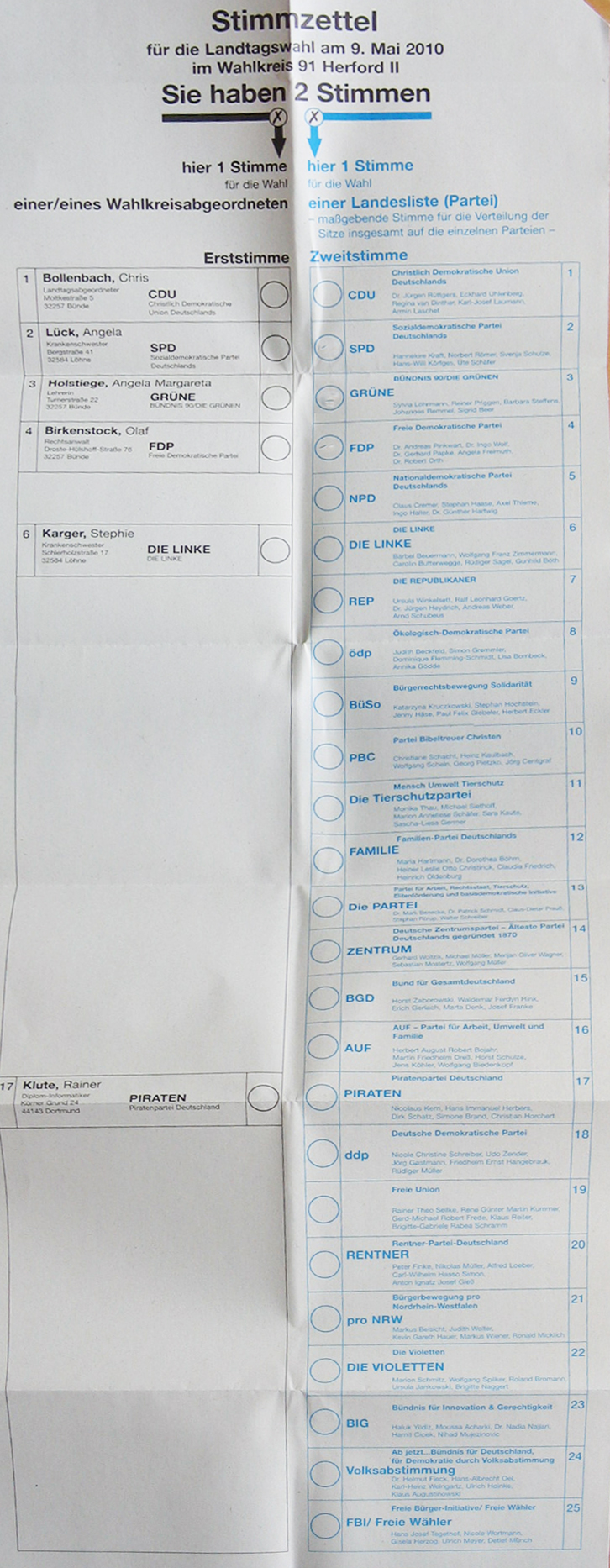
Ballot for the electoral district of Herford II, in the 2010 election

The left column of the ballot is designated for the first vote, which is for a direct candidate, and the right column is for the second vote, which is for a party list. The order of the parties depends first on the number of votes achieved by each party in the last state election. These are followed by parties running for the first time, listed in the order that they registered with the state electoral commission.

=== Replacing individual members ===
Through resignation, loss of eligibility, or death, outgoing members of parliament will be replaced, regardless of whether they were elected by direct mandate or through the lists, by the next person on the party list who has not yet taken office (for instance, if ten of eleven people on a party list are sent to parliament, but one of those ten resigns, then the eleventh person who did not get elected will take his place). For members who were elected directly and do not belong to a party list, a special election is held.

For the loss of a seat as a result of the banning of a party, it is necessary to distinguish between representatives who were elected directly from an electoral district, versus those who were elected from the lists. In the case of a direct mandate, a new election takes place in which the individual who lost his seat is not eligible to run. Regarding those elected from lists, the representative in question will only be replaced if they were elected as part of an unconstitutional party.

=== Terms ===
The parliament elected in 1947 only had a term of three years. The constitution from 1950 then established a four-year term for members of parliament, which was extended to five years in 1969. The term for each parliament member begins at the first session of parliament, and a regular parliamentary election must take place within the last three months of the term. Each new parliament convenes for the first time within 20 days of the election, but not before the end of term for the outgoing parliament. Parliament can be dissolved by a majority vote of its members, and this occurred for the first time on 14 March 2012. The state government has never dissolved parliament since before this could happen, the electorate would have to approve a bill through referendum that the state government had proposed and that the parliament had already rejected. In all cases, new elections must take place within 60 days of the dissolution of parliament.

=== Changes to electoral law ===
After the election in 2005, parliament shrank from 201 regular members to 181, after the electoral districts were reduced from 151 to 128, and the list-elected members were increased from 50 to 53. (Of course, due to overhang and leveling seats, parliament still has over 200 members.)

The method to divide the seats based on votes for the parties (the second vote) also changed in 2005, switching from the largest remainder method to the Sainte-Laguë Method.

Until 2005, the voting system in North Rhine-Westphalia was quite distinct from both the federal system and those found in the other states of Germany. While federal elections had already instituted the two vote system discussed above, North Rhine-Westphalia voters only had one vote to cast for the candidate of their choice in their electoral district. These votes then were also counted for the list of the candidate's political party and were used to divide the seats not apportioned to particular electoral districts. This disadvantaged certain parties, such as the Left Party (with candidates only in 116 districts) and the Ecological Democratic Party (only in 78 districts), since they could not field candidates in every district, and thus did not have the same number of potential voters for their lists. The introduction of the second vote in May 2010 changed all that.

=== Election results ===
==== Landtag 2012 ====
Results by district, 2012

In the 2012 state election, which brought to power the 16th Parliament of North Rhine-Westphalia, parliament was again made up of five parties. However, the Left Party fell below the 5% threshold and was forced to give up its seats in parliament, while the Pirate Party, with 7.8% of the popular vote, captured 20 seats. The SPD won 99 seats, while the CDU managed to pick up 67. This marked the first time in 12 years that the SPD won the largest percentage of votes, and it marked a transition of their minority coalition with the Greens to one with a legislative majority. The following table details the results:

Summary of the 13 May 2012 Landtag of North Rhine-Westphalia elections results
Party	Popular vote			Seats	
Party	Votes	%	+/–	Seats	+/–
Social Democratic Party of Germany; Sozialdemokratische Partei Deutschlands - SPD	3,050,160	39.1%	▲4.6%	99	▲32
Christian Democratic Union; Christlich Demokratische Union Deutschlands - CDU	2,050,633	26.3%	▼8.3%	67	Steady
Alliance '90/The Greens; Bündnis 90/Die Grünen	884,136	11.3%	▼0.8%	29	▲6
Free Democratic Party; Freie Demokratische Partei – FDP	669,971	8.6%	▲1.9%	22	▲9
Pirate Party Germany; Piratenpartei Deutschland	608,957	7.8%	▲6.2%	20	▲20
Die Linke; Die Linke	194,239	2.5%	▼3.1%	0	▼11
Other parties	335,730	4.4%	▲0.9%	0	Steady
Valid votes	7,794,126	98.6%	Steady		
Invalid votes	107,796	1.4%	Steady		
Totals and voter turnout	7,901,922	59.6%	▲0.3%	237	▲56
Electorate	13,264,231	100.00	—		
Source: Die Landeswahlleiterin des Landes Nordrhein-Westfalen

==== Parliament before 2012 ====
State elections and administrations in North Rhine-Westphalia, Germany, since 1946

The first parliament of North Rhine-Westphalia was actually appointed during the British occupation following WWII, and was not replaced by a democratically elected body until 1947. Until 2005, the state was a stronghold of the SPD and social democracy, with each President-Minister between 1966 and 2005 coming from that party. Under the leadership of Karl Arnold, the CDU lead the government from 1947 until 1956 (the longest period that the CDU has been in power in the state). They again held the position of President-Minister from 1958 until 1966 under Franz Meyers as coalition leader, and during the period of SPD rule from 1966 until 2005, they were the largest party in parliament during two election periods. They could not, however, organize a coalition either time. The 2005 state parliament elections led for the first time in decades their return to power over the SPD, who nevertheless maintained their domination in the Ruhr. The CDU suffered heavy losses in the elections of 2010, but remained a strong force in parliament. Because they could not form a majority with the FDP and after the SPD rejected offers of a grand coalition under a CDU Minister-President, the SPD and the Greens formed a minority government under Minister-President Hannelore Kraft (SPD), who was elected to the position with support from the Left.

=== Proportion of women in parliament ===
In the most recent legislative period (which elected the 16th Parliament of the State of North Rhine-Westphalia), the proportion of female deputies in parliament was nearly 30%. After falling during recent election periods, this percentage increased slightly over the 15th Parliament, which was 27.07% female, but was lower than both the 14th Parliament (31.02%), as well as the 13th (32.47%).

The Greens have the highest percentage of women in parliament, at 51.7%, which is well above the SPD, which is 33.3% female, the CDU, at 22.4%, and the FDP, at 18.2%. At the bottom of the list is the Pirate Party, whose representatives are only 15% female.

The leadership of the 16th Parliament is once again led by a woman, namely the newly elected President of Parliament Carina Gödecke, who replaced Eckhard Uhlenberg.

As in previous election periods, the state party leaders are entirely male. For two parties (the Pirate Party and the Greens), the management of the parties' parliamentary groups is in the hands of women.

Additionally, the election of Hannelore Kraft marks the first time ever that a woman has headed the state government. Likewise, Sylvia Löhrmann remains a Deputy Minister-President.

The following table compares the percentage of women in parliament from each party in the current parliament term and the previous one. Figures from the previous term are denoted by parentheses:

Party	Total	Women	Percent
CDU	67 (67)	15 (10)	22.4% (14.93%)
FDP	22 (13)	4 (2)	18.2% (15.38%)
SPD	99 (67)	33 (19)	33.33% (28.36%)
The Greens	29 (23)	15 (12)	51.7% (52.17%)
Pirate Party	20	3	15%
Parliament Total	237 (181)	70 (49)	29.54% (27.07%)

(Figures from the website of the State Parliament of North Rhine-Westphalia.)

== See also ==
- 1995 North Rhine-Westphalia state election
- 2000 North Rhine-Westphalia state election
- 2005 North Rhine-Westphalia state election
- 2010 North Rhine-Westphalia state election
- 2012 North Rhine-Westphalia state election
- 2017 North Rhine-Westphalia state election
- List of members of the Landtag of North Rhine-Westphalia 2017-2022
