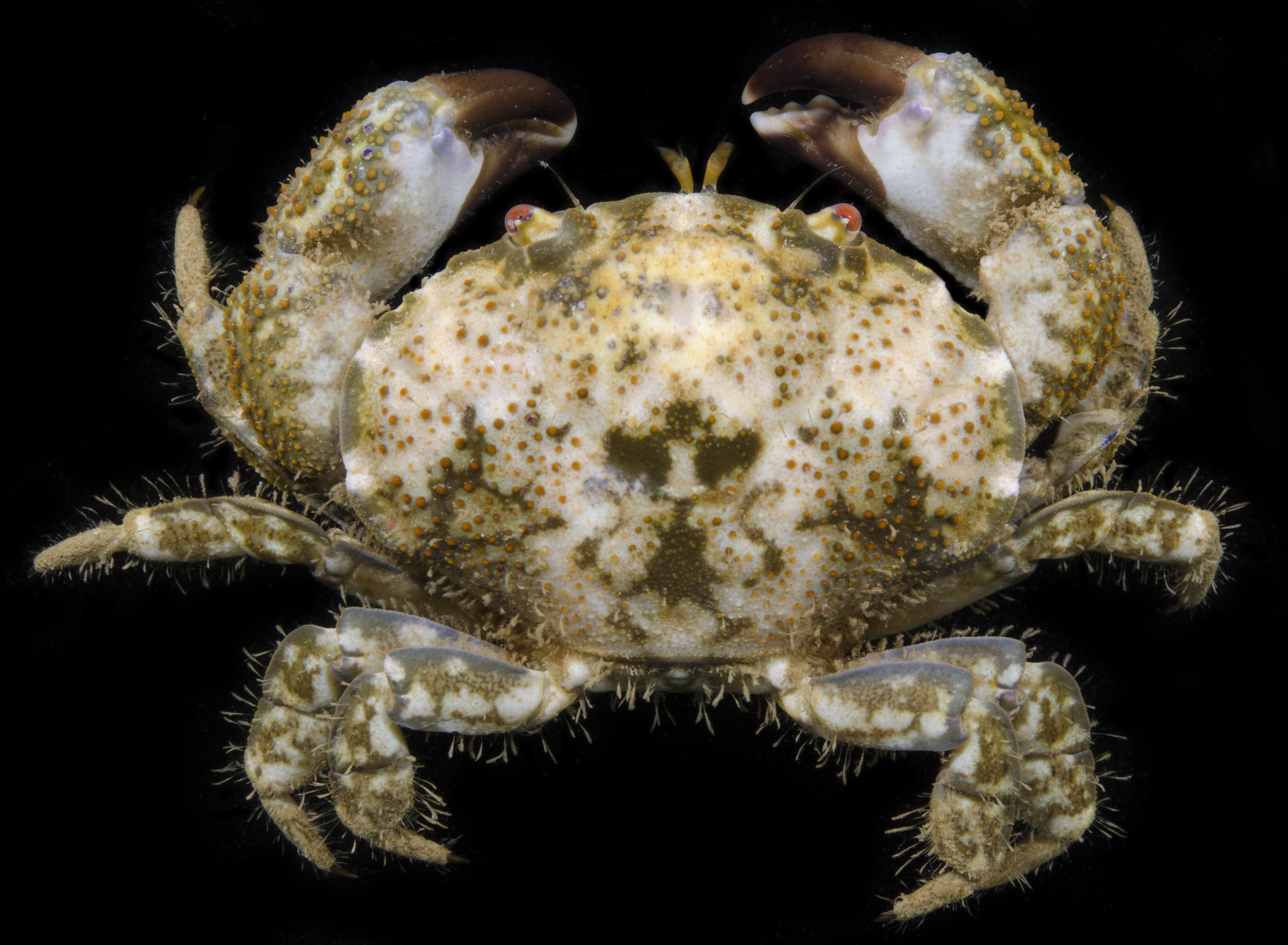

Scientific classification
- Kingdom: Animalia
- Phylum: Arthropoda
- Clade: Pancrustacea
- Class: Malacostraca
- Order: Decapoda
- Suborder: Pleocyemata
- Infraorder: Brachyura
- Family: Xanthidae
- Genus: Platypodia
- Species: P. eydouxi

Binomial name
- Platypodia eydouxi (A. Milne-Edwards, 1865)

= Platypodia eydouxi =

Species of crab

Platypodia eydouxi, also called the red-eyed xanthid crab, is a crab that belongs to the family Xanthidae. It is primarily found in coral reefs and shallow marine environments across the Indo-Pacific, including Hawaii, where it is crucial in maintaining marine biodiversity.

== Description ==
Platypodia eydouxi is characterized by its distinctive red eyes, which contrast with its brownish, oval-shaped carapace. The species typically has a broad and flattened body, with a sturdy carapace that provides protection. Males tend to have slightly larger and more pronounced claws compared to females, though both genders share similar body structures. These physical traits allow the species to blend into its coral reef environment, aiding in both defense and predation.

== Distribution and habitat ==
Platypodia eydouxi is primarily found in the Indo-Pacific region, with populations spread across countries such as Japan, Indonesia, and Australia. This species thrives in marine habitats like coral reefs, mangroves, and rocky shores, where it finds shelter and abundant food sources. To survive, Platypodia eydouxi relies on warm water temperatures and a steady supply of small marine organisms, which support its ecological role as both predator and prey in these environments.
