= Jerome H. Holland =

American diplomat (1916–1985)

United States Ambassador to Sweden
- In office April 14, 1970 – August 30, 1972
- President: Richard Nixon
- Preceded by: William Womack Heath
- Succeeded by: Robert Strausz-Hupé

9th President of Hampton University
- In office 1960–1970
- Preceded by: Alonzo G. Morón
- Succeeded by: Roy D. Savage

President of Delaware State College
- In office 1953–1960
- Preceded by: Oscar J. Chapman
- Succeeded by: Luna I. Mishoe

Personal details
- Born: Jerome Heartwell Holland; January 9, 1916 Auburn, New York, U.S.
- Died: January 13, 1985 (aged 69) New York City, U.S.
- Party: Republican
- Spouses: Madeline Smalls (m. 1941; div. 1944); Laura Mitchell (m. 1948)
- Children: 4
- Education: Cornell University; University of Pennsylvania
- Awards: Presidential Medal of Freedom; NFF Distinguished American Award (1972)
- Football career

No. 86 – Cornell Big Red
- Position: End

Personal information
- Listed height: 6 ft 0 in (1.83 m)
- Listed weight: 205 lb (93 kg)

Career information
- High school: Auburn (Auburn, New York)
- College: Cornell (1936–1938)

Awards and highlights
- Consensus All-American (1938); First-team All-American (1937); 2× First-team All-Eastern (1937, 1938); Second-team All-Eastern (1936)
- College Football Hall of Fame (Class of 1965)

Jerome Heartwell "Brud" Holland (January 9, 1916 – January 13, 1985) was an American university president and diplomat. He was the first African American to play college football at Cornell University, and was chosen as an All American in 1937 and 1938. He was also the first African American to chair the American Red Cross Board of Governors, which named its Laboratory for the Biomedical Sciences in his honor. He was the first African-American to sit on the board of the New York Stock Exchange (1972), and the first appointed to Massachusetts Institute of Technology's governing body, "The Corporation".

== Early life and education ==
Jerome Holland was born January 9, 1916, in Auburn, New York, the fourth child of Robert Holland Jr., and Viola Holland.

He attended Auburn High School from 1930 to 1934, where he played football and basketball, lettering in both sports. After beginning his collegiate studies at the New York State School of Agriculture in 1935, he soon thereafter enrolled in undergraduate studies at Cornell University. He studied sociology, receiving his Bachelor of Science in 1939 and Master's degree in 1941. Holland became the first African American to play on Cornell's football team. He was named an All-American in 1937 and 1938.

His Cornell football exploits later led to his induction into the College Football Hall of Fame in 1965.

== Delaware State College presidency ==
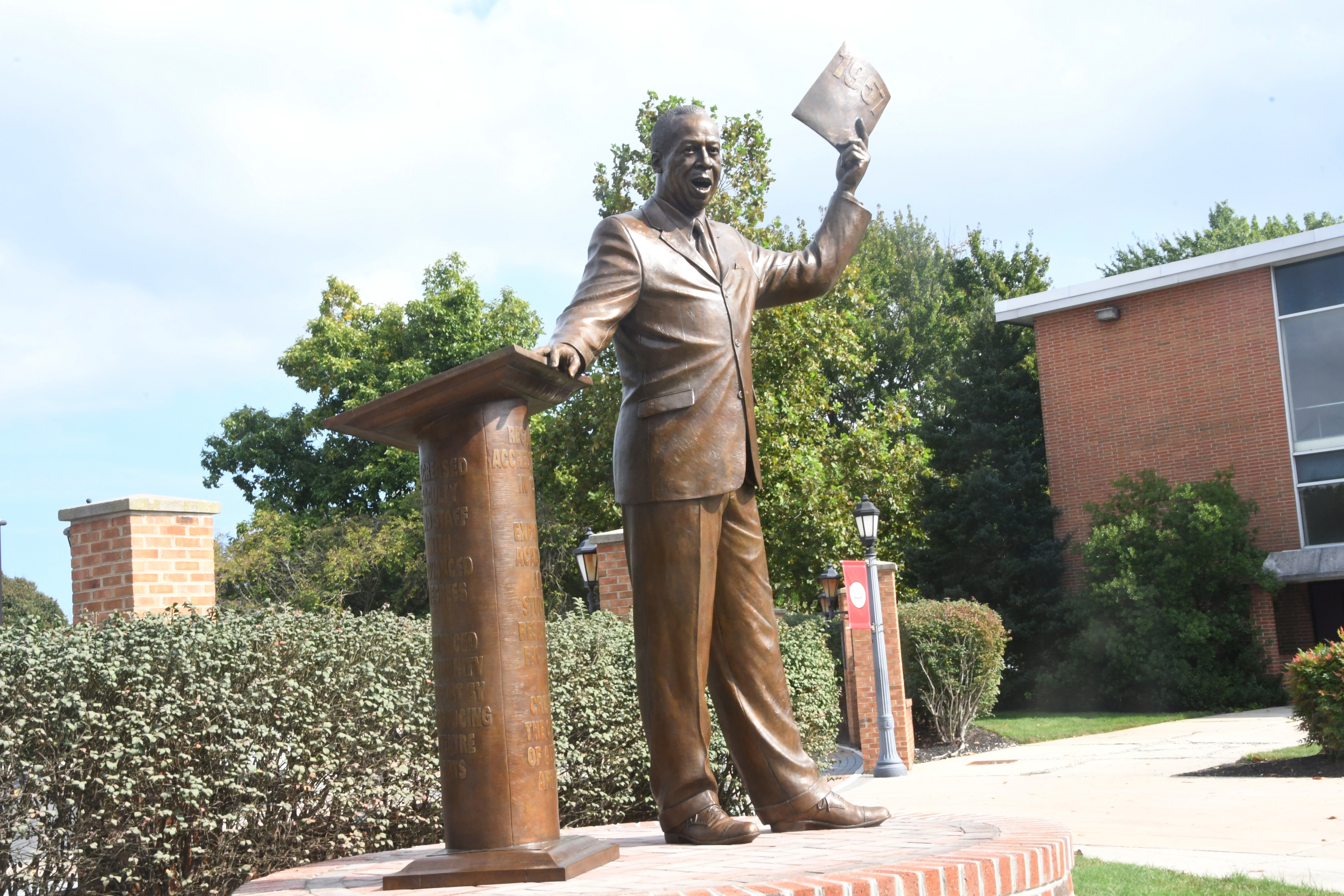
Memorial statue of Dr. Jerome Holland, president of Delaware State College from 1953 to 1960

In early 1953, Holland met newly elected Delaware Gov. J. Caleb Boggs. After a couple of meetings between the two, Gov. Boggs convinced the Board of Trustees of Delaware State College to fill the school's leadership vacancy by appointing Holland to be the sixth president in the then-62-year history of the institution. In assuming the presidency of the DSC on July 1, 1953, Holland took over the leadership of a school that was at the lowest point in its history. The historically black college had lost its accreditation as a four-year institution of higher education in 1949. In the subsequent years, some state officials were calling for the closure of DSC, while other advocated that it be converted to a junior college for Blacks.

Under President Holland's leadership, significant improvements were made to the operation of the DSC Business Office. Dr. Holland then persuaded the Delaware General Assembly (DSC) to appropriate $2.45 million to the college, which resulted in the construction of five new buildings, some faculty housing units, as well as other building additions and renovations. He oversaw the reorganization of the school's administrative structure and athletics programs, and the streamlining of its academic departments. The college's first-ever general education program was established during his tenure, and there was a significant increase volume of books and the usage of the campus library.

President Holland persuaded the Delaware General Assembly to pass legislation that increased the DSC Board of Trustees from six to 11 members, with five members appointed by the board. It was also during his tenure that the DSU integrated for the first time by the hiring of its first white faculty members and the enrollment of its first white students.

Most importantly, the predominant achievement of President Holland's seven-year tenure was 1957 reaccreditation of Delaware State College by the Middle States Association of Colleges and Schools (the accrediting body for the Mid-Atlantic region).

Dr. Holland is also credited with greatly strengthening what previously had been a dormant relationship between the college and its alumni through the establishment of an Office of Alumni Affairs. Under Dr. Holland's leadership, the college also began attracting new philanthropic funding support.

In March 1960, Dr. Holland announced his resignation from Delaware State College to accept a new appointment—the presidency of then-Hampton Institute (now University).

In 2018, Delaware State University erected and dedicated the Dr. Jerome H. Holland Memorial Statue on the front of the campus near the main entrance. The statue was created by Brad Vanneman, a sculptor artist from Wilmington, Del.

== Hampton Institute presidency ==
Holland succeeded Alonzo G. Morón as the ninth president of the Hampton Institute (now called Hampton University) in a tenure that lasted from 1960 to 1970.

During his ten-year presidency, Hampton experienced a new period of growth that included the construction of 12 new buildings at the cost of approximately $19 million. Alumni contributions increased by 643 percent; the annual budget of the school increased by 300 percent; the faculty increased in number by 66 percent and the average faculty salary doubled.

== Post academia years and death ==
Soon after Holland's retirement as president of Hampton Institute, he served as ambassador to Sweden for two years between 1970 and 1972. His appointment was protested by some Swedish people, and the demonstrations contained racist attacks for which the Swedish government issued an official apology. Holland was the first African American to sit on the board of the New York Stock Exchange, and served on the boards of AT&T, General Foods, the Culbro Corporation, Federated Department Stores, Manufacturers Hanover Trust, Pan American Bankshares, the Union Carbide Corporation, Zurn Industries, and Continental Corporation.

In 1979, as the result of his appointment by President Jimmy Carter, Holland became the first African American to serve as the chairman of the Red Cross Board of Governors, a position he held until his death. The Red Cross renamed its research and development laboratory in Holland's honor in 1987.

Holland died in New York City on January 13, 1985. He was posthumously awarded the Presidential Medal of Freedom in April 1985 by President Ronald Reagan.

== Family ==
Holland was one of 10 children. His son Joe Holland also played football for Cornell. He was selected as a third team All-American running back by the Associated Press for its 1978 team, and as a graduate student with a 3.70 GPA, the same year, as an Academic All American. In 1991, he became a member of the Academic Hall of Fame. An attorney, playwright and entrepreneur, Joe Holland is a Republican, as was his father. He filed as a candidate for Governor of New York in the 2018 election.

== Sources ==
- Remarks at the Presentation Ceremony for the Presidential Medal of Freedom

Diplomatic posts
Preceded by William Womack Heath	U.S. Ambassador to Sweden; 1970–1972	Succeeded by Robert Strausz-Hupé
