= André Kuper =

German politician (born 1960)

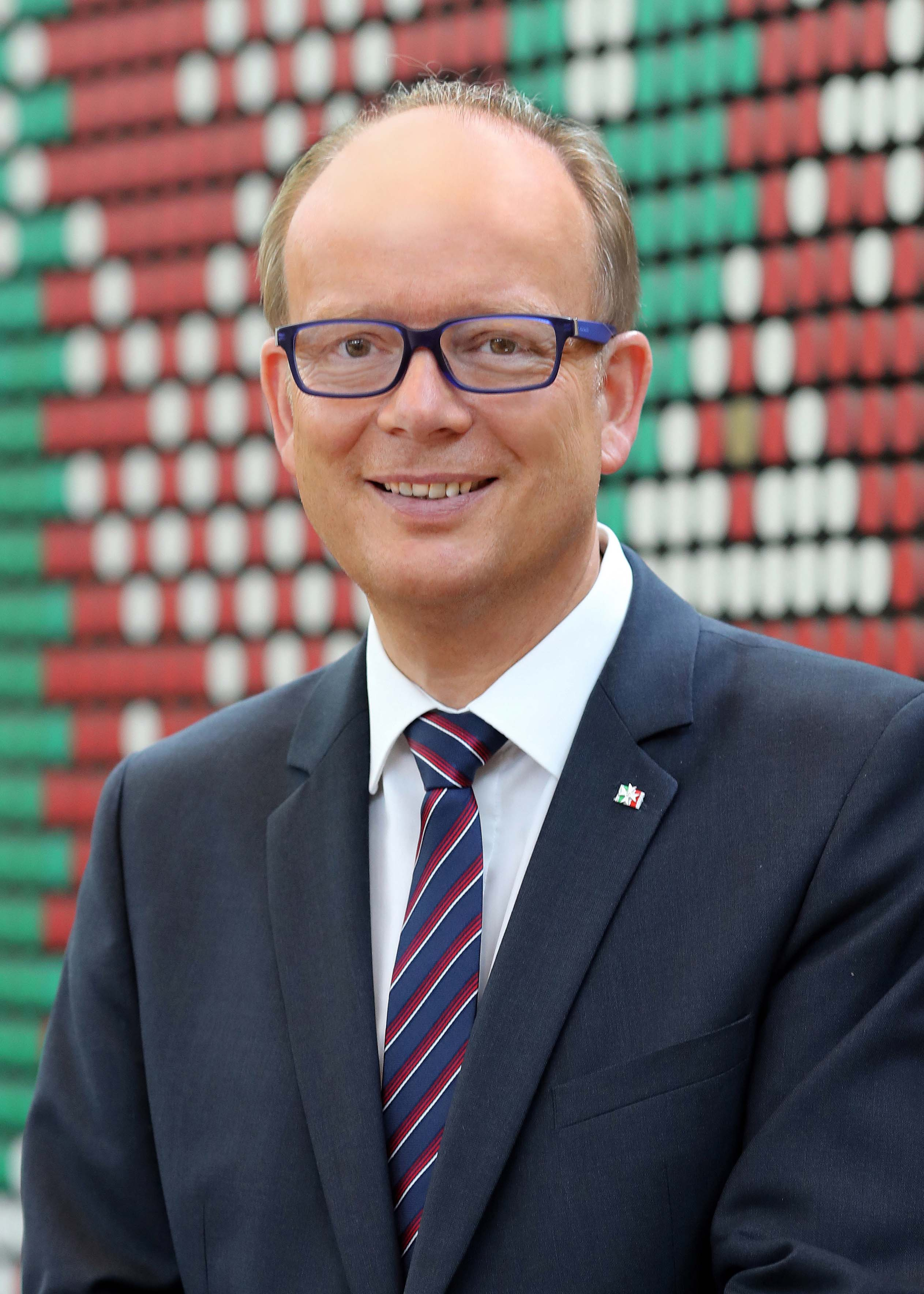
André Kuper in 2017

André Kuper (born 14 December 1960 in Wiedenbrück) is a German politician from the Christian Democratic Union. Between 1997 and 2012 he was mayor of the city of Rietberg. Since then he has been a member of the Landtag of North Rhine-Westphalia. Kuper was elected president of the State Parliament on 1 June 2017. In 2022 he was re-elected to this office for another five years.
