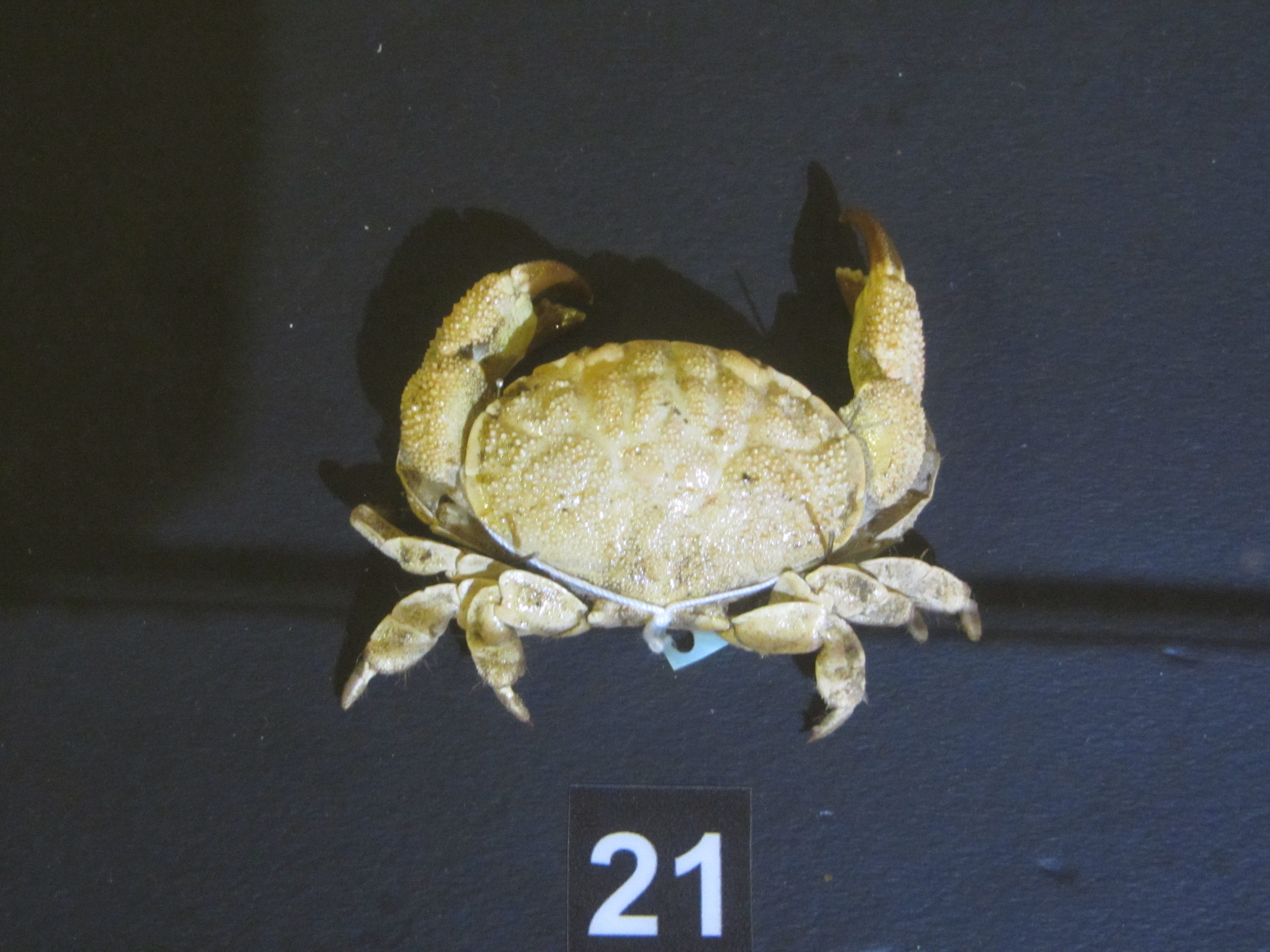
- Platypodia granulosa

Scientific classification
- Domain: Eukaryota
- Kingdom: Animalia
- Phylum: Arthropoda
- Class: Malacostraca
- Order: Decapoda
- Suborder: Pleocyemata
- Infraorder: Brachyura
- Family: Xanthidae
- Subfamily: Zosiminae
- Genus: Platypodia; Bell, 1835

= Platypodia =

Genus of crabs

Platypodia is a genus of crabs in the family Xanthidae, containing the following species:

- Platypodia alcocki Buitendijk, 1941
- Platypodia cristata (A. Milne Edwards, 1865)
- Platypodia delli Takeda & Webber, 2006
- Platypodia eydouxi (A. Milne Edwards, 1865)
- Platypodia foresti Serene, 1984
- Platypodia granulosa (Ruppell, 1830)
- Platypodia morini (Ward, 1942)
- Platypodia pseudogranulosa Serene, 1984
- Platypodia semigranosa (Heller, 1861)
- Platypodia tomentosa (De Man, 1902)
