= Moron Lake =

Lake in the state of Alaska, United States

- Location within Alaska
- Location: Aleutians West Census Area, Alaska, United States
- Coordinates: 52°0′17″N 177°30′27″E
- Type: lake

Moron Lake is a lake in Aleutians West Census Area, Alaska, in the United States.

Moron Lake was so named, because the U.S. military needed a name to begin with the letter M in order to fit with their alphabetical naming system.
