= Linus Morin =

Swedish ice hockey player

- Born: January 30, 1987 (age 39) Uppsala, Sweden
- Height: 5 ft 11 in (180 cm)
- Weight: 176 lb (80 kg; 12 st 8 lb)
- Position: Defence
- Shot: Left
- Played for: Gimo IF; Brynäs IF; Nybro Vikings IF; VIK Västerås HK; IK Oskarshamn
- Playing career: 2004–2018

Linus Morin (born January 30, 1987, in Uppsala) is a Swedish ice hockey player. He is currently playing with the IK Oskarshamn in the HockeyAllsvenskan. He has played with the Brynäs IF in the Elitserien.

== Career statistics ==
			Regular season					Playoffs
Season	Team	League	GP	G	A	Pts	PIM	GP	G	A	Pts	PIM
2001–02	Gimo IF	Division 1	13	0	0	0	0	—	—	—	—	—
2002–03	Gimo IF	Division 1	25	1	2	3	4	—	—	—	—	—
2003–04	Brynäs IF J18	J18 Allsvenskan	7	1	2	3	2	3	2	1	3	0
2003–04	Brynäs IF J20	J20 SuperElit	15	0	0	0	4	5	2	0	2	0
2004–05	Brynäs IF J20	J20 SuperElit	33	5	7	12	2	—	—	—	—	—
2004–05	Brynäs IF	Elitserien	2	0	0	0	0	—	—	—	—	—
2005–06	Brynäs IF J20	J20 SuperElit	14	2	1	3	6	2	1	0	1	0
2005–06	Brynäs IF	Elitserien	5	0	0	0	0	—	—	—	—	—
2006–07	Brynäs IF J20	J20 SuperElit	13	2	8	10	4	4	1	0	1	0
2006–07	Brynäs IF	Elitserien	14	0	0	0	4	—	—	—	—	—
2006–07	Nybro Vikings IF	HockeyAllsvenskan	16	6	5	11	20	—	—	—	—	—
2007–08	VIK Västerås HK	HockeyAllsvenskan	40	1	9	10	31	10	0	0	0	4
2008–09	IK Oskarshamn	HockeyAllsvenskan	30	1	6	7	6	—	—	—	—	—
2009–10	IK Oskarshamn	HockeyAllsvenskan	34	1	2	3	10	—	—	—	—	—
2010–11	IK Oskarshamn	HockeyAllsvenskan	47	2	10	12	18	—	—	—	—	—
2011–12	IK Oskarshamn	HockeyAllsvenskan	52	1	4	5	2	6	0	0	0	0
2012–13	IK Oskarshamn J20	J20 Elit	1	0	0	0	2	—	—	—	—	—
2012–13	IK Oskarshamn	HockeyAllsvenskan	45	6	2	8	12	6	0	1	1	2
2013–14	IK Oskarshamn	HockeyAllsvenskan	24	2	2	4	4	—	—	—	—	—
2014–15	IK Oskarshamn J20	J20 Elit	1	0	0	0	0	—	—	—	—	—
2014–15	IK Oskarshamn	HockeyAllsvenskan	13	0	0	0	0	—	—	—	—	—
2015–16	IK Oskarshamn	HockeyAllsvenskan	50	0	0	0	4	2	0	0	0	0
2016–17	IK Oskarshamn	HockeyAllsvenskan	17	0	2	2	4	—	—	—	—	—
2017–18	IK Oskarshamn	HockeyAllsvenskan	14	1	0	1	0	—	—	—	—	—
Elitserien totals			21	0	0	0	4	—	—	—	—	—
HockeyAllsvenskan totals			382	21	42	63	111	24	0	1	1	6
