= Moran (given name) =

Moran is a unisex given name. In Hebrew it refers to the viburnum plant.

- Moran Atias (born 1981), Israeli actress
- Moran Doc Boggs (1898-1971), American singer, songwriter and banjo player
- Moran Buzovski (born 1992), Israeli rhythmic gymnast
- Moran Fridman (born 1990), Israeli footballer
- Moran Lavi (born 1983), Israeli footballer
- Moran Mazor (born 1991), Israeli singer
- Moran Roth (born 1982), Israeli basketball player
- Moran Samuel (born 1982), Israeli paralympic basketball player and world champion rower
- Moran Sarkar, Indian dancer who married Maharaja Ranjit Singh of Punjab in 1802

== See also ==
- Edward James Moran Campbell (1925–2004), Canadian physician and academic
- Torrance Moran Norris (born 1978), American former National Football League player
