= Alonzo G. Morón =

American educator and civil servant (1909–1971)

Alonzo Graseano Morón

Commissioner of Education and of Welfare in the U.S. Virgin Islands
- In office 1933–1936

8th President of Hampton University
- In office October 1949 – 1959
- Preceded by: Ralph P. Bridgman
- Succeeded by: Jerome H. Holland

Deputy Regional Director of United States Department of Housing and Urban Development in Puerto Rico
- In office c. 1964–1971

Personal details
- Born: Alonzo Graseano Brown; April 12, 1909 Charlotte Amalie, St. Thomas, Danish Virgin Islands
- Died: October 31, 1971 (aged 62) San Juan, Puerto Rico
- Spouse: Leola "Lee" Rowena Churchill
- Education: Hampton Institute
- Alma mater: Brown University, University of Pittsburgh, Harvard Law School
- Occupation: Educator, civil servant

Alonzo Graseano Morón (née Alonzo Graseano Brown; 1909–1971), was a Danish Virgin Islands-born American educator, university president, sociologist, and civil servant. He was the first Black president of the Hampton Institute (now Hampton University) a HBCU in Virginia, from 1949 to 1959; a former Commissioner of Education and of Welfare in the Virgin Islands; and a former deputy regional director of the United States Department of Housing and Urban Development in San Juan, Puerto Rico.

== Early life and education ==
Alonzo Graseano Brown was born April 12, 1909, in Charlotte Amalie, St. Thomas, Danish Virgin Islands (now United States Virgin Islands). He and his sibling were primarily raised by their single mother, Caroline Louisa Brown. In 1917, the island became a territory of the United States, but there were not many educational opportunities. In 1923 at age 14, he left the island to attend a secondary vocational school and learn the trade of upholstery at Hampton's Academy in Virginia, a school affiliated with Hampton Institute (now Hampton University).

He continued his studies at Brown University in Providence, Rhode Island, where he graduated with a B.A. degree (1932) in sociology and was elected to Phi Beta Kappa. While attending college, he changed his surname to his father's surname of Morón. In 1932, he married Leola "Lee" Rowena Churchill from Farnham, Virginia. They never had children.

With the Rosenwald Fellowship starting in 1944, he was able to attend Harvard Law School in Cambridge, Massachusetts; and he received a L.L.B. (1947). In 1950, Wilberforce University awarded him an honorary law degree (L.L.D.).

== Career ==
The National Urban League provided Morón with a scholarship to study at the University of Pittsburgh, where he received a master's degree (1933) in social work. After graduation he worked as a case worker at the Baltimore's Emergency Relief Commission briefly, where he was the first Black employee. Followed by working for Paul Martin Pearson, the first civilian governor of the U.S. Virgin Islands. While working for Pearson, Morón was appointed by President Franklin D. Roosevelt in the role of Commissioner of Education and of Welfare in the Virgin Islands, serving from 1933 to 1936.

Morón had a very close relationship with educator John Hope, who had urged him to enroll in a training institution for housing management and offered him support. In 1936, he moved to Atlanta, Georgia to serve as the assistant administrator of the acting president Florence Read of Atlanta University (now Clark Atlanta University). While living in Atlanta, he managed a 675-unit housing project apartment building; he managed the John Hope Homes (or University Homes); and lectured on housing issues at Atlanta University.

While he was still attending law school, he worked as a business management consultant for Hampton Institute, a historically Black university in Virginia. He had been the acting president of Hampton starting in April 1949, and moved up to the role of president in October 1949. Morón was the first Black president of Hampton University, serving from 1949 to 1959. During his time at Hampton Institute, the school was admitted to the Southern Association of Colleges and Schools (SACS). Morón resigned as president due to issue with the school's Board of Trustees; they had rejected Morón's proposals for university fundraising, and the board had violated proper channels of administrative rule over grievances with faculty and students, happening during the period right before the civil rights movement.

After leaving Hampton Institute in 1959, he moved with his family to St. Thomas. He served as the deputy regional director of the United States Department of Housing and Urban Development in San Juan, Puerto Rico from c. 1964 until his death in 1971.

== Death and legacy ==
Morón died on October 31, 1971, in San Juan, Puerto Rico. His archives are held at the Hampton University Archives Collection.

He was the subject of the book, Civil Rights and Politics at Hampton Institute: The Legacy of Alonzo G. Moron (University of Illinois Press, 2007) by Hoda M. Zaki.
