= Moran's Oyster Cottage =

Seafood restaurant and pub in Kilcolgan, Ireland

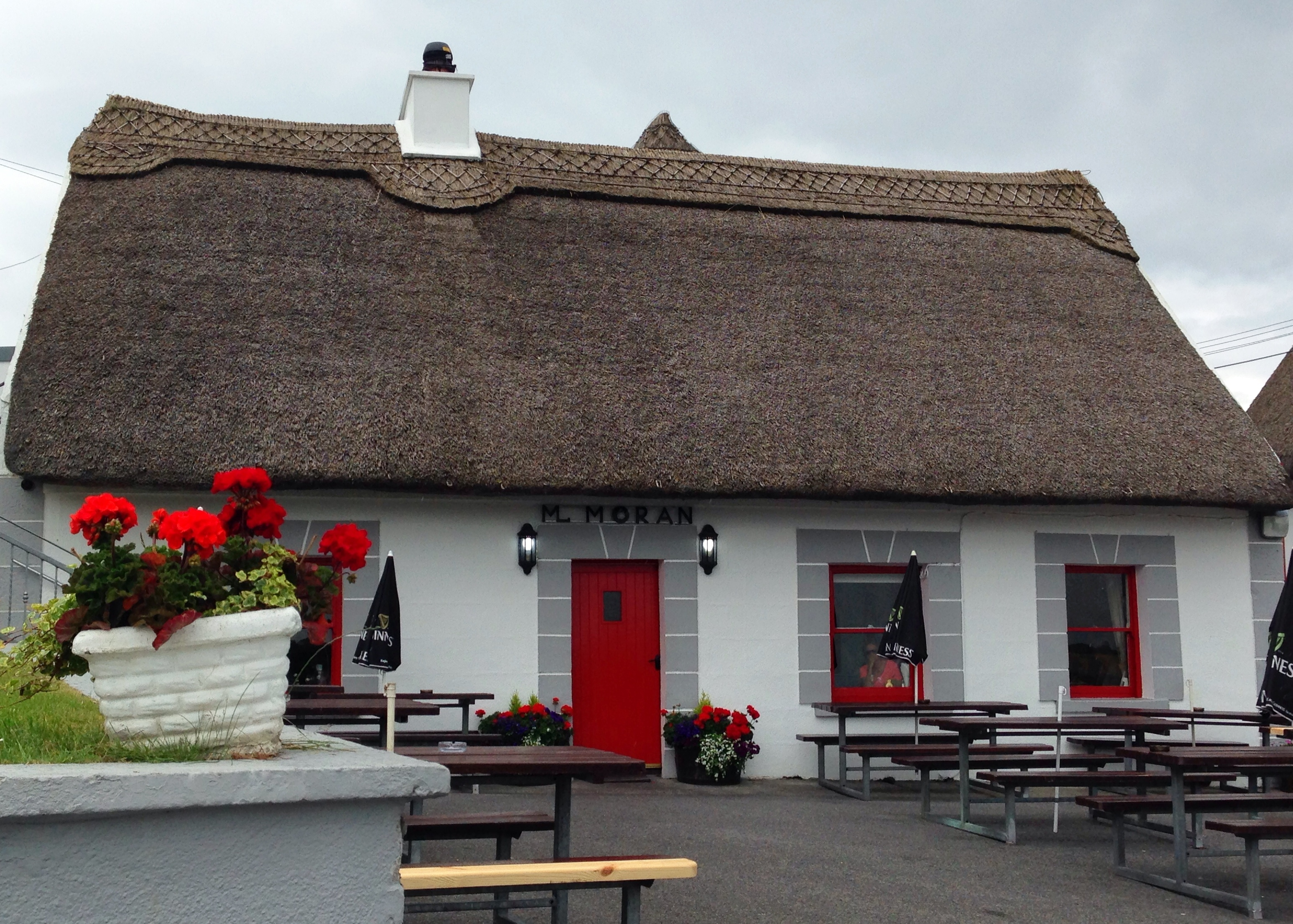

Restaurant information
- Established: 1760s
- Food type: Irish seafood
- Location: The Weir, Kilcolgan, County Galway, Ireland
- Website: MoransOysterCottage.com

Moran's Oyster Cottage is a seafood restaurant and pub located at The Weir, Kilcolgan, in County Galway, Ireland, close to the village of Clarinbridge, and ten miles south of Galway City. Known for its seafood, including oysters and smoked salmon, the business has hosted several celebrities. Nobel laureate Seamus Heaney's poem "Oysters" was reputedly inspired by a meal at Moran's.

== Location and history ==
The restaurant is located on an inlet of Galway Bay in a traditional thatched cottage and has historically been owned by members of the Moran family.

Daniel Moran first obtained a liquor licence and opened a pub in the area in the 1760s. The pub began "making a business of seafood" in the 1960s, after the Galway Oyster Festival was founded.

The pub and restaurant has hosted a number of celebrities, including Julia Roberts, Pierce Brosnan and the Emperor and Empress of Japan.

== See also ==
- List of seafood restaurants
