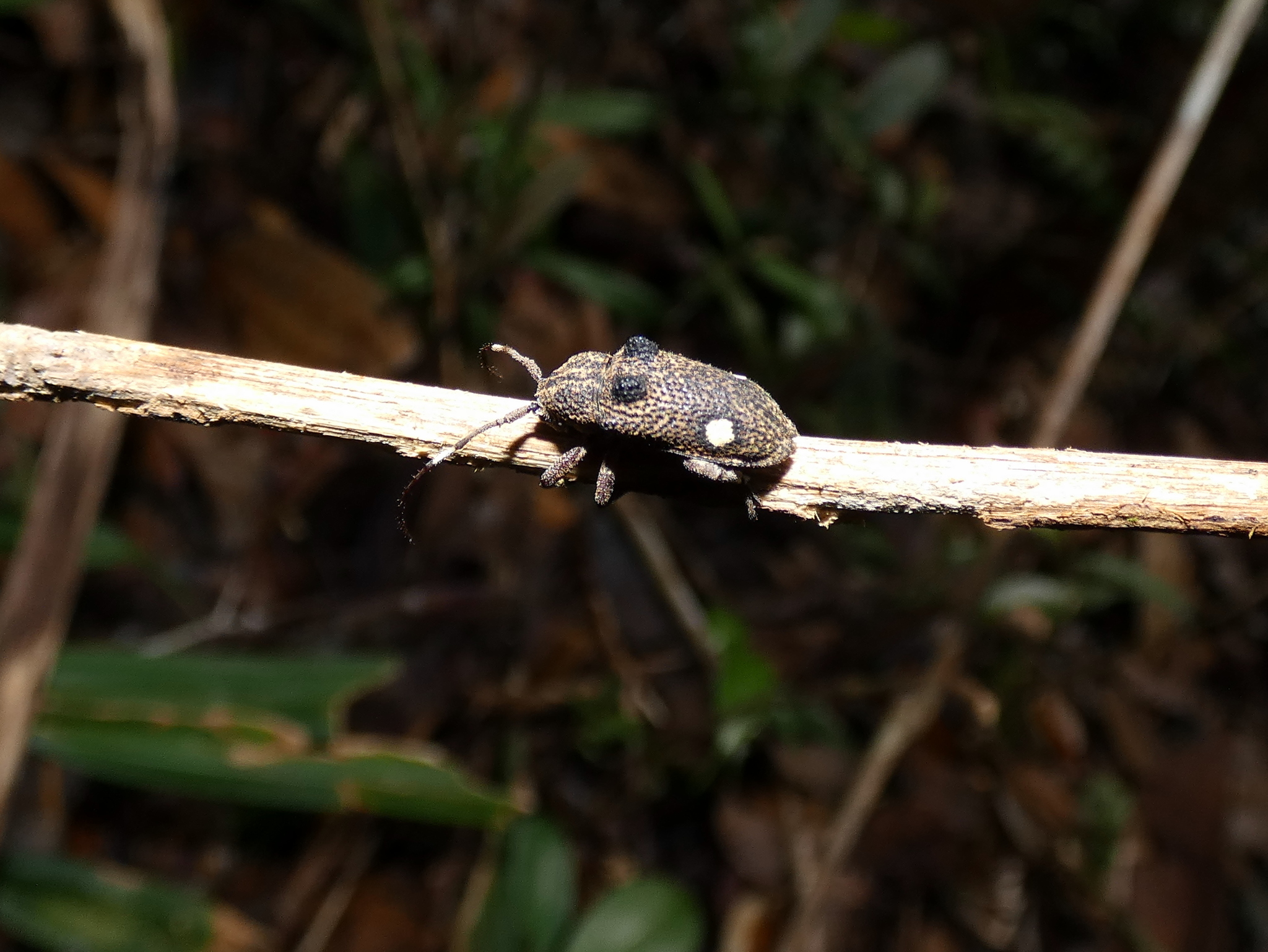
- Moron distigma, Malaysia

Scientific classification
- Kingdom: Animalia
- Phylum: Arthropoda
- Class: Insecta
- Order: Coleoptera
- Suborder: Polyphaga
- Infraorder: Cucujiformia
- Family: Cerambycidae
- Subfamily: Lamiinae
- Tribe: Pteropliini
- Genus: Moron
- Species: M. distigma

Binomial name
- Moron distigma Pascoe, 1858

= Moron distigma =

Species of beetle

Moron distigma is a species of longhorned beetle in the family Cerambycidae, the only species of the genus Moron. It is found on Borneo.
