= Moran Township, Todd County, Minnesota =

Moran Township, Minnesota
- Township
- Location within the state of Minnesota Moran Township, Minnesota (the United States)
- Coordinates: 46°14′27″N 94°49′23″W
- Country: United States
- State: Minnesota
- County: Todd

Area
  - Total: 36.0 sq mi (93.3 km^{2})
  - Land: 35.6 sq mi (92.1 km^{2})
  - Water: 0.46 sq mi (1.2 km^{2})
- Elevation: 1,266 ft (386 m)

Population (2020)
  - Total: 489
  - Density: 15/sq mi (5.6/km^{2})
- Time zone: UTC-6 (Central (CST))
  - Summer (DST): UTC-5 (CDT)
- ZIP code: 56479
- Area code: 218
- FIPS code: 27-44062
- GNIS feature ID: 0665030

Moran Township is a township in Todd County, Minnesota, United States. The population was 515 at the 2000 census. By the 2020 census the population had declined to 489.

Moran Township was organized in 1877, and named after Moran Creek which joins the Long Prairie River in the township. Upham says that Moran Creek was named for an early lumberman. He also writes that there was a post office called Miram Brook there from 1874 - ’76. At a later date the post office was transferred to William J. Graves hotel in the village of Moran. The post office closed in 1914.

== Geography ==
According to the United States Census Bureau, the township has a total area of 36.0 square miles (93.3 km^{2}), of which 35.6 square miles (92.1 km^{2}) is land and 0.5 square mile (1.2 km^{2}) (1.28%) is water. The Long Prairie River flows northwardly through the eastern part of the township.

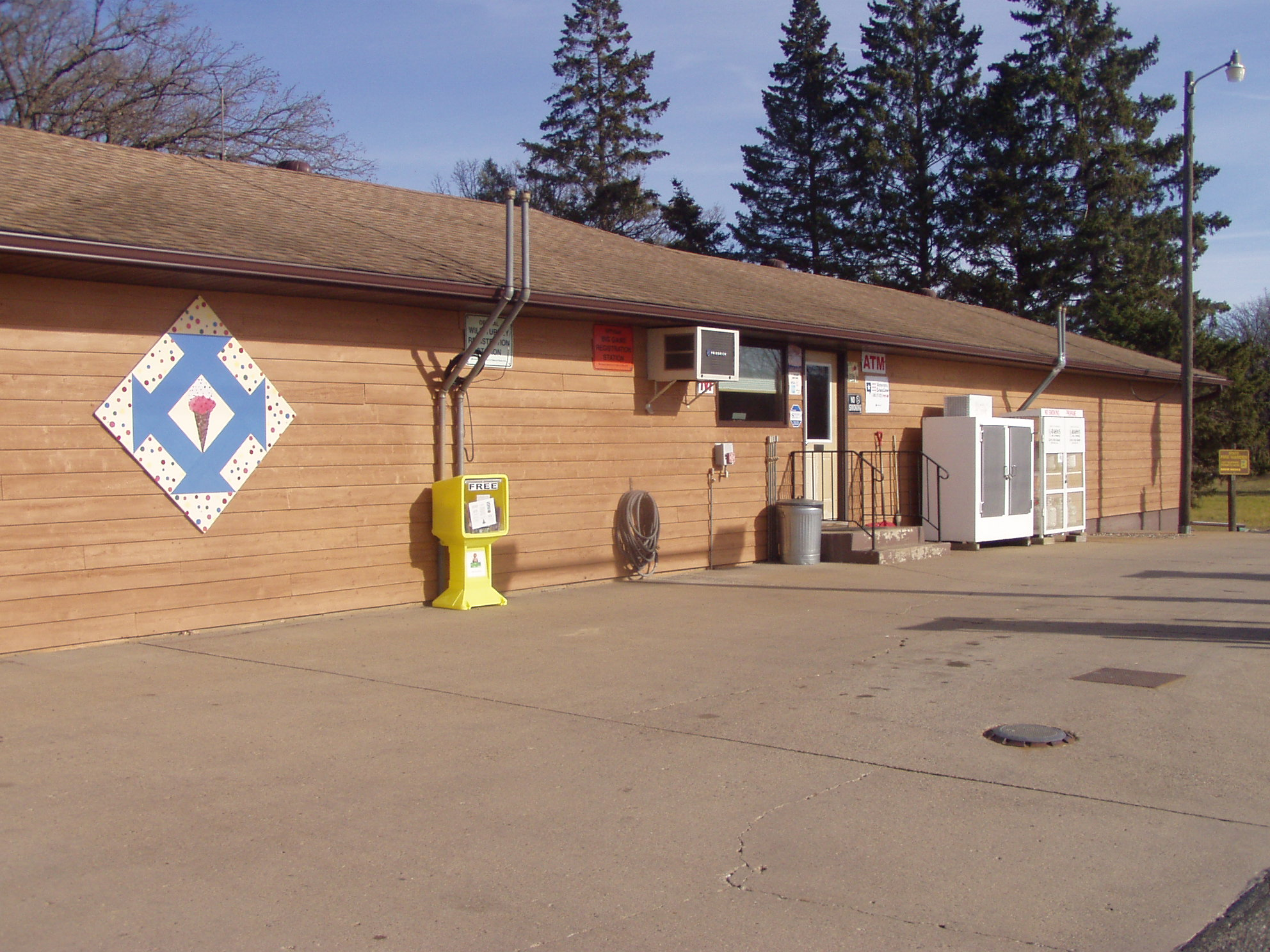
Don and Dave's is a Moran Township land mark.

== Demographics ==
As of the census of 2000, there were 515 people, 186 households, and 143 families residing in the township. The population density was 14.5 people per square mile (5.6/km^{2}). There were 235 housing units at an average density of 6.6/sq mi (2.6/km^{2}). The racial makeup of the township was 96.70% White, 0.58% African American, 0.78% Native American, 1.55% from other races, and 0.39% from two or more races. Hispanic or Latino of any race were 1.55% of the population.

There were 186 households, out of which 33.9% had children under the age of 18 living with them, 67.7% were married couples living together, 4.3% had a female householder with no husband present, and 23.1% were non-families. 19.4% of all households were made up of individuals, and 7.5% had someone living alone who was 65 years of age or older. The average household size was 2.77 and the average family size was 3.20.

In the township the population was spread out, with 28.9% under the age of 18, 7.0% from 18 to 24, 27.6% from 25 to 44, 25.4% from 45 to 64, and 11.1% who were 65 years of age or older. The median age was 38 years. For every 100 females, there were 111.1 males. For every 100 females age 18 and over, there were 119.2 males.

The median income for a household in the township was $27,083, and the median income for a family was $29,125. Males had a median income of $24,464 versus $16,528 for females. The per capita income for the township was $15,144. About 13.1% of families and 18.0% of the population were below the poverty line, including 19.3% of those under age 18 and 23.6% of those age 65 or over.

St. Isidore's Roman Catholic Church, founded by Polish immigrants in 1899, is located in the township.
