= Morion =

Morion may refer to:

- Morion (helmet), a type of military helmet
- Morion (mineral), a variety of smoky quartz
- Morion (beetle), a genus of beetles in the family Carabidae
- MV Morion formerly Empire Fang, an Empire F type coaster
