= Morrin =

Morrin may refer to:

== Places ==
- Morrin, Iran, a village in Kerman Province, Iran
- Morrin, Alberta, a village in Alberta, Canada

== Facilities ==
- Morrin College, the first anglophone institute of higher education in Quebec City, Quebec, Canada
- Morrin Centre, a cultural centre in Quebec City, Quebec, Canada

== People ==
- Joseph Morrin (1794–1862), Scottish Canadian doctor and mayor
- Thomas H. Morrin, an American engineer and the director of engineering at SRI International from 1948 to 1963
- Wayne Morrin (born 1953), a retired Canadian professional ice hockey player
- Brad Morrin (born 1981), an Australian professional rugby league footballer
- Kurtis Morrin (born 2000), an Australian professional rugby league footballer

== See also ==
- Morin
