= Joseph H. Holland =

American politician

Commissioner of the New York State Department of Housing and Community Renewal
- In office January 1995 – October 1996
- Governor: George Pataki
- Preceded by: Angelo Aponte
- Succeeded by: Joseph Lynch

Personal details
- Born: New York City
- Party: Republican
- Relations: Jerome H. Holland (father)
- Children: 3
- Education: Harvard Law School; Cornell University
- Occupation: Lawyer, author, businessman, public servant

Joseph H. Holland is an American businessman, real estate developer, attorney, public servant, author, and civic leader. Holland was selected by Governor George Pataki to serve as Commissioner of the New York State Department of Housing and Community Renewal, a position he held from 1995 until his resignation in October 1996. Holland ran for Attorney General of New York in 1994 and 2018 and ran for Governor of New York in 2018; he has also run for New York State Senate.

== Early life and education ==
One of ten children, Holland is the son of Laura Mitchell Holland and Jerome H. Holland, who served as the United States Ambassador to Sweden under President Richard Nixon. He received a B.A. and an M.A. from Cornell University. Holland played on the Cornell Big Red football squad. He became a member of the Academic Hall of Fame and was president of the Quill and Dagger Society. Holland attended Harvard Law School, graduating in 1983.

== Political career ==
A Republican, Holland served as co-chair of George Pataki's successful 1994 gubernatorial campaign. Following his 1994 victory, Gov. Pataki appointed Holland Commissioner of the New York State Department of Housing and Community Renewal. Holland held this position from 1995 until October 1996, when he resigned to "'focus on resolving outstanding personal business matters'" following "threats by creditors to [garnish] his state salary in a bid to enforce court judgments." At the time, a spokesperson for Gov. Pataki stated that the Governor "accepted Holland's resignation 'regretfully'" and added that "'Commissioner Holland [had] served the state exceptionally well.'"

Holland has run for New York State Senate; he also ran for Attorney General of New York in the 1994 Republican primary, but "dropped out of the race under pressure from GOP leaders to clear the way for Dennis Vacco, who won in November."

In early 2018, Holland announced that he was running for Governor of New York. Holland withdrew from the race on May 22, 2018, to instead run for Attorney General of New York. At the 2018 New York State Republican Party Convention, Holland gained enough votes to force a primary for the attorney general post; however, he threw his support to the first-place finisher, Keith Wofford.

== Career outside politics ==
According to The New York Times, Holland moved to Harlem in 1982; in the following decade, he opened a law office, "started and ran a 15-bed homeless shelter in a church basement, founded a drug rehabilitation program and acquired a travel agency. He also opened the first Ben & Jerry's store in Harlem and a soul food restaurant, staffing both with homeless-shelter residents". During the mid-1980s, Holland worked in Albany as Counsel to the New York State Senate Housing Committee.

Following his stint as Commissioner of the New York Department of Housing and Community Renewal, Holland was a partner at the law firm of Wilson, Elser, Moskowitz, Edelman & Dicker. Holland left that post to form Uptown Partners, a real estate development company that focused on housing in Harlem; he reportedly sought to "aid churches and nonprofit organizations by developing their underused properties, and encourage successful African-Americans to invest in blighted neighborhoods". One of his projects, the Uptown Grand restaurant, enmeshed him in a flood of accusations and counter-accusations with regard to the financing of the enterprise and conflicts with his partner Thomas Lopez-Pierre.

An author, Holland has published a spiritual memoir entitled From Harlem With Love: An Ivy Leaguer’s Inner-City Odyssey; he has also published two plays (Cast Me Down, an Off-Broadway play that received six AUDELCO nominations, and Homegrown, "which experienced two extended runs at Harlem’s landmark National Black Theatre") and a self-help book entitled The Touchstone Tools: Building Your Way To An Inspired Life.

Holland is an ordained minister.

== Personal life ==
Holland married American Journal correspondent Alisa White in 1995. The Hollands have three children.
