= Moran Creek (Hay Creek tributary) =

Creek in Montana

Coordinates: 48°43′46″N 114°16′07″W

Moran Creek is a stream in the U.S. state of Montana. It is a tributary to Hay Creek.

Moran Creek was named after an early settler.
