= Morin (disambiguation) =

Morin is a French surname.

Morin may also refer to:

== Places ==
- Morin-Heights, Quebec, a town in the Laurentian Mountains region of Quebec, Canada
- Morin Lake, a small lake northwest of Prince Albert, Saskatchewan, Canada
- Morin River, a tributary of the Rivière aux Écorces in Quebec, Canada
- Morinville, a town within Sturgeon County in Alberta, Canada
- Grand Morin, a 118 km long river in France, left tributary of the Marne
- Petit Morin, an 86 km long river in France, left tributary of the Marne
- Quartier-Morin, a municipality in the Cap-Haïtien Arrondissement, in the Nord Department of Haiti
- Val-Morin, Quebec, a municipality in the Laurentides region of Quebec, Canada
- Morin Dawa Daur Autonomous Banner, a banner of Hulunbuir, Inner Mongolia, China

== Other uses ==
- Morin (flavonol), a molecule
- Morin khuur, a Mongolian bowed stringed instrument (within whose name the word morin translates as "horse")
- That Pig Of A Morin in a short story by Guy de Maupassant

== See also ==
- Morini (disambiguation)
- Morrin (disambiguation)
