= Edgar Moron =

German politician (1941–2023)

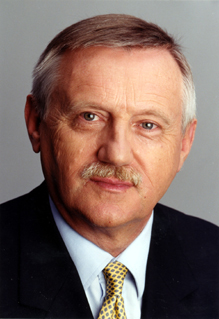

Edgar Moron (28 August 1941 – 7 September 2023) was a German politician for the Social Democratic Party of Germany (SPD). He served in the Landtag of North Rhine-Westphalia for twenty years, from 1990 to 2010, reaching the position of 1st Vice President in 2005.

== Career ==
Born in Beuthen, Silesia, Germany (modern Bytom, Poland), he graduated from high school in 1962, then completed a degree in political science in 1967 at the Free University of Berlin. After a spending a year as an assistant at the John F. Kennedy-Institute for North American Studies, based at his alma-mater, he worked at the East College of the Federal Agency for Civic Education until 1973.

Moron became a member of the SPD in 1970 and went on to serve as the local association president in Erftstadt and was a member of the sub-district board of the Rhein-Erft district. He also started to become involved in trade union activism with the Arbeiterwohlfahrt and Vereinte Dienstleistungsgewerkschaft.

Moron was a Member of the City Council of Erftstadt from 1975 to 2000 and was President of the Socialist Group from 1979 to 1998. He was also a member of the Rhein-Erft-Kreis district council in 1989 and served as Chairman of the Social Democratic Party faction there (1994–2000). He was a member of the District Planning Council in the Cologne region from 1989 to 1999.

Moron was elected Member of the Landtag of North Rhine-Westphalia in 1990 and remained in the position until 2010. In the 11th and 12th legislative period he represented as a directly elected member of the 11th constituency (Erft-Kreis III and Euskirchen I) and later the constituency for Erftkreis IV. Between 1998 and 2000, Moron was parliamentary managing director of the SPD. From 2000 to 2005 he was parliamentary group leader. After losing state elections of 2005, he did not stand again for this office. Instead, he supported the candidacy of Hannelore Kraft. In the election period 2005 to 2010, Moron was 1st Vice President of the Landtag.

In an interview on 18 May 2010, Moron expressed skepticism about a coalition with the Left in NRW, because of its "absurd" policies and suggested a possible coalition with the Christian Democratic Union of Germany instead.

Edgar Moron died on 7 September 2023, at the age of 82.
