= Moran Creek (Minnesota) =

Stream in Todd County, Minnesota, U.S.

Coordinates: 46°14′15″N 94°48′17″W

Moran Creek is a stream in Todd County, in the U.S. state of Minnesota.

Moran Creek bears the name of a lumberman.

== See also ==
- List of rivers of Minnesota
