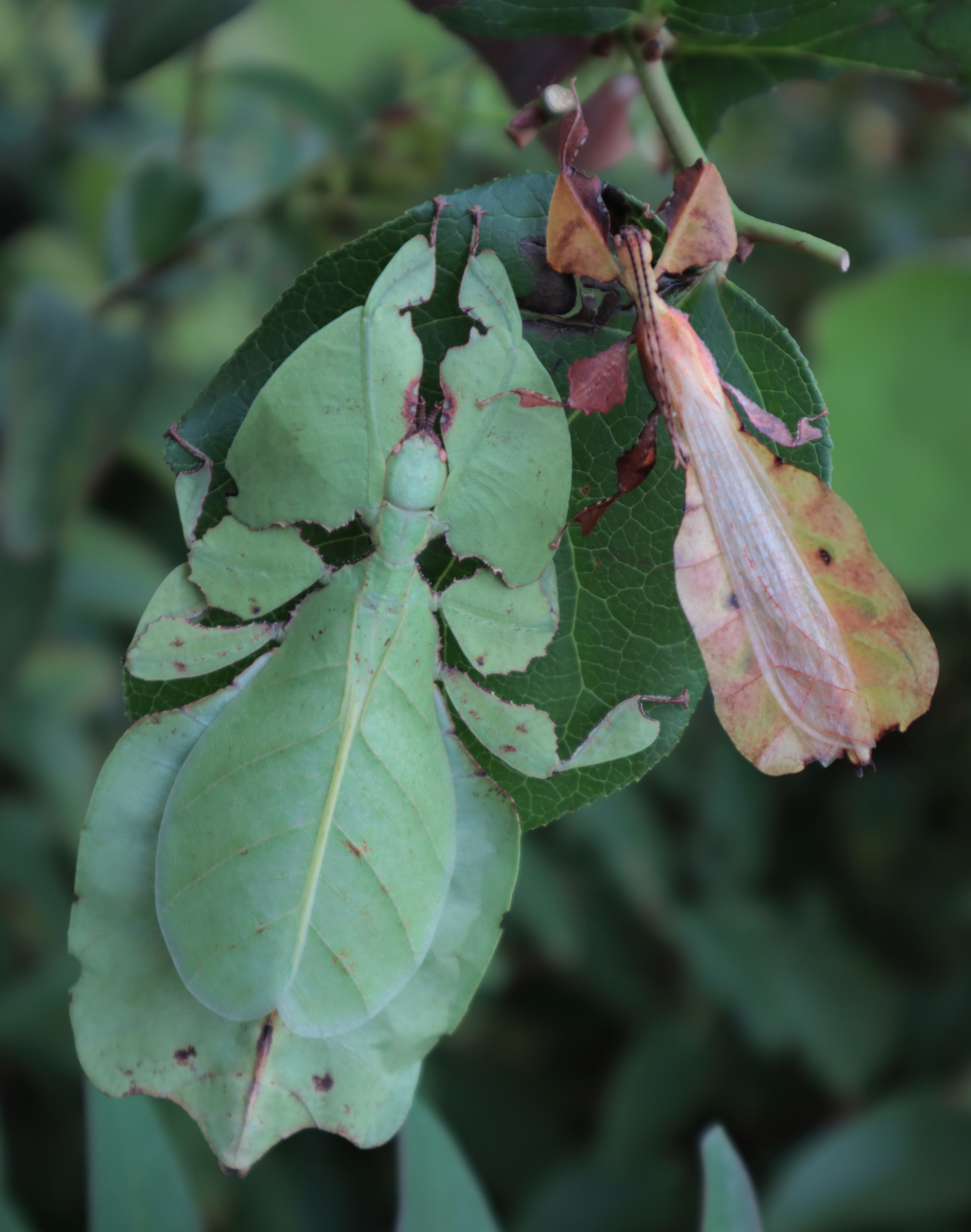
- Pulchriphyllium pulchrifolium, left female, rght male

Scientific classification
- Kingdom: Animalia
- Phylum: Arthropoda
- Clade: Pancrustacea
- Class: Insecta
- Order: Phasmatodea
- Suborder: Euphasmatodea
- Superfamily: Phyllioidea
- Family: Phylliidae
- Tribe: Phylliini
- Genus: Pulchriphyllium; Griffini, 1898

Type species
- Pulchriphyllium pulchrifolium (Serville, 1838)

Species
- List: Pulchriphyllium abdulfatahi; Pulchriphyllium agathyrsus; Pulchriphyllium agnesagamaae; Pulchriphyllium anangu; Pulchriphyllium bhaskarai; Pulchriphyllium bioculatum; Pulchriphyllium crurifolium; Pulchriphyllium delislei; Pulchriphyllium detlefgroesseri; Pulchriphyllium fredkugani; Pulchriphyllium giganteum; Pulchriphyllium heracles; Pulchriphyllium lambirensis; Pulchriphyllium maethoraniae; Pulchriphyllium mannani; Pulchriphyllium pulchrifolium; Pulchriphyllium rimiae; Pulchriphyllium scythe; Pulchriphyllium shurei; Pulchriphyllium sinense

= Pulchriphyllium =

Genus of stick insects

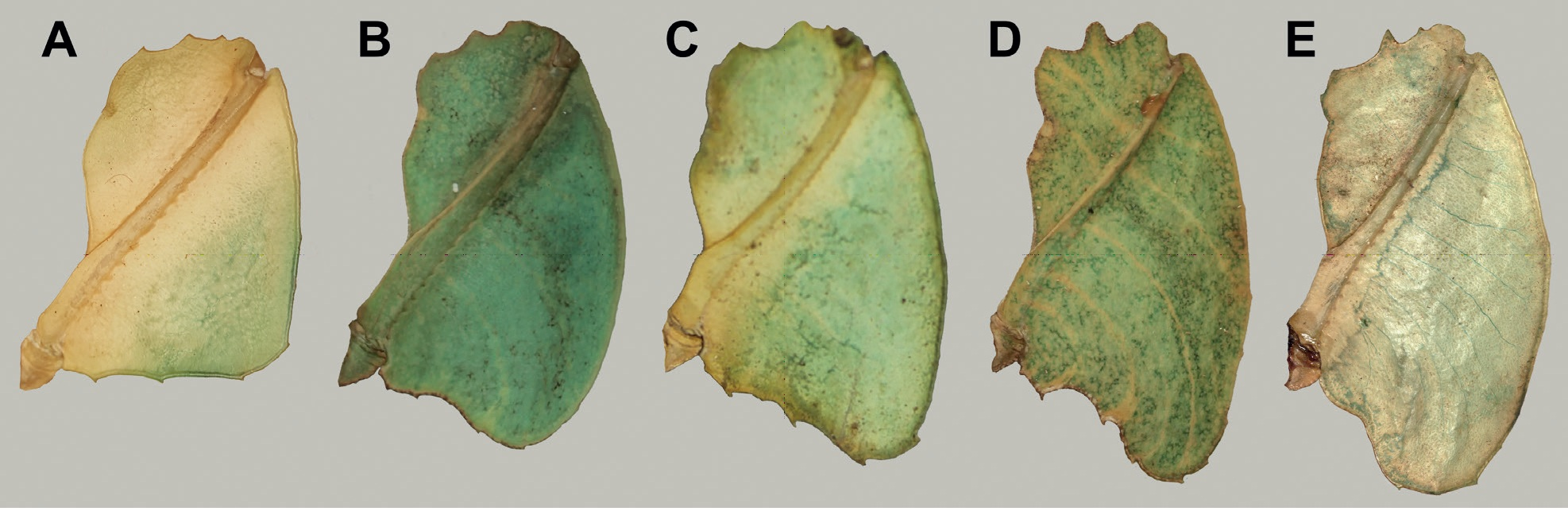
Lobes of femurs of the forelegs of adult females of A Pulchriphyllium crurifolium, B Pulchriphyllium bioculatum, C Pulchriphyllium scythe, D Pulchriphyllium pulchrifolium, E Pulchriphyllium bhaskarai

Pulchriphyllium is a genus of leaf insects (belonging to the Phasmatodea); it was initially described as a subgenus of Phyllium, which unites medium-sized to large species. These are native to Seychelles, Sri Lanka, India, Bangladesh and large parts of Southeast Asia.

== Description ==
=== Females ===
Females reach body lengths from 67 to 114 millimetres (2.6 to 4.5 in). The last segment of their antennae is as long as the two preceding segments combined. The prescutum is as wide as it is long or significantly longer than it is wide. Well-developed external lobes (tibiale exteriore loben) are present on the tibiae of the forelegs, midlegs, and hindlegs. The most striking feature is the large lobe on the femura of the forelegs. These are the largest leg lobes found in leaf insects. While the inner lobes (profemurale interiore lobes) extend over approximately two-thirds to three-quarters of the femura's length, the outer lobes (profemurale exteriore lobes) cover the entire length of the femura. They widen proximally at an angle extending beyond the femora's origin. The forewings (tegmina) usually reach only to the seventh or eighth abdominal segment, less frequently to the ninth. In most species, they do not reach the edge of the abdomen. The longitudinal veins of the tegmina are characterized by the parallel medial (M) and cubital (Cu) veins, which touch almost along their entire length. The cubital vein is either simple, i.e., undivided, or bifurcated, but then only divided into an anterior cubitus (CuA) and a posterior cubitus (CuP1). Hindwings (alae) are absent in females.

=== Males ===
Males have been recorded with body lengths of 50 to 80 millimetres (2.0 to 3.1 in). Their prescutum is also as wide as it is long or significantly longer than wide. The tibiae of the forelegs always have fully developed inner and outer lobes (protibiale interiore and exteriore lobes). The middle and hind legs also have fully developed outer lobes. The lobes on the femora of the forelegs are present on both the inner and outer sides and are significantly larger than those on the tibiae. On the outer side of the hind femora, there is a prominent lobe extending the entire length of the femora (metafemural exteriorer lobe). The veins of the hindwings (alae) are also characteristically developed. As in many leaf insects, the radius (R) is divided into the first radius (R1) and the radial sector (RS). A characteristic feature of male Pulchriphyllium is that the radial sector (RS), the anterior media (MA), and the posterior media (MP) fuse with the cubitus (Cu) at various points and then converge to the wing margin. The abdomen is very broad in its posterior two-thirds. In this region, it may run almost parallel to the abdomen or taper or widen slightly towards the apical portion. The hindwings typically cover only the middle third and extend to the end of the abdomen or terminate just short of it. The vomer, characteristically shaped in many stick insects, has a single apical hook in Pulchriphyllium.

=== Eggs ===
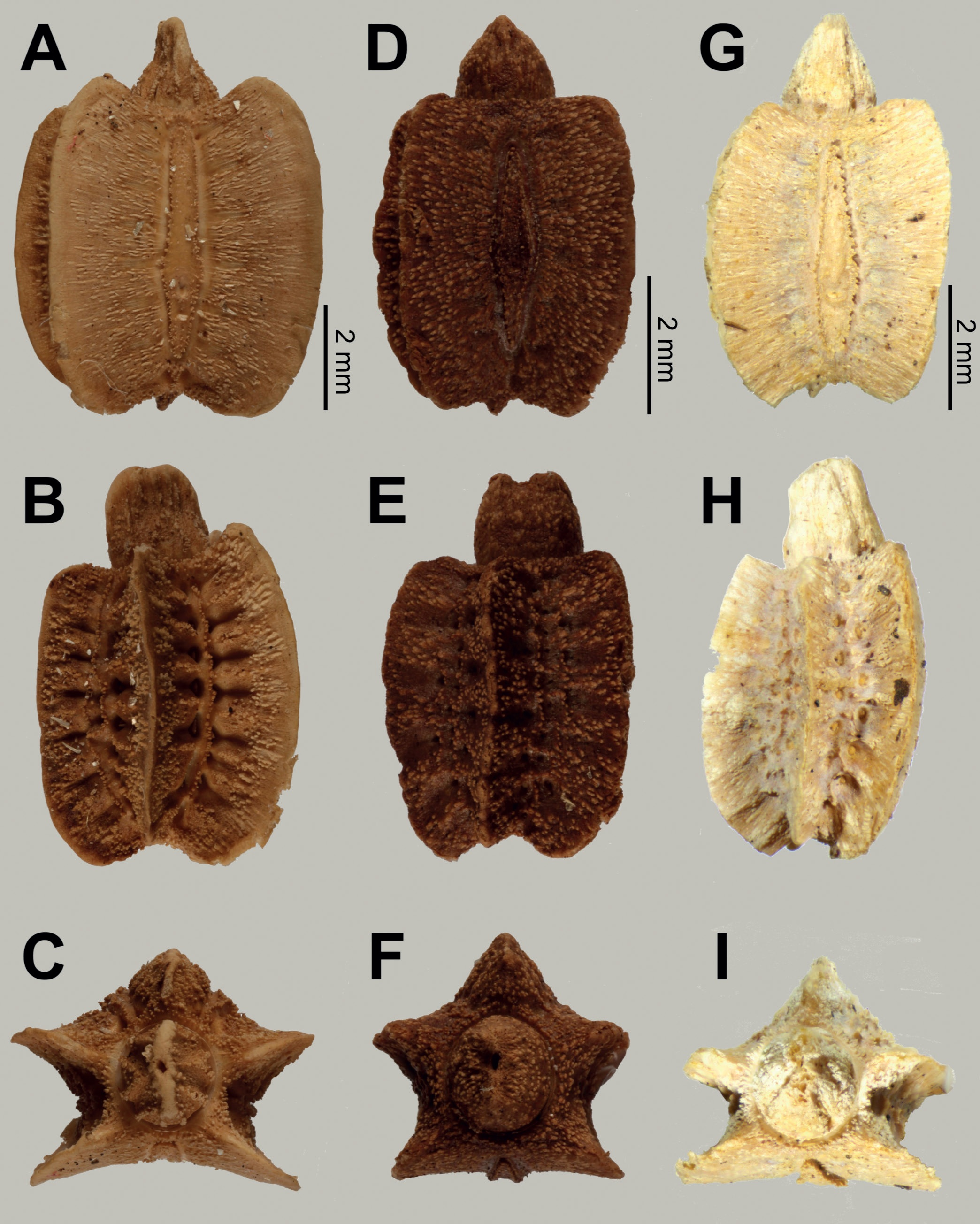
Eggs of A–C Pulchriphyllium bioculatum, D–F Pulchriphyllium crurifolium, G–I Pulchriphyllium agathyrsus, top row dorsal view, middle row lateral view, bottom row anterior (opercular) view

Eggs are known from various Pulchriphyllium species. In cross-section, they can be distinctly pentagonal, more triangular, or flat on the dorsal side and otherwise nearly circular. The more pentagonal eggs possess prominent, angular wings, which give them a star-like appearance in cross-section. The angle between the two dorsal wings is larger than that between the other wings. This shape is typical of species such as Pulchriphyllium pulchrifolium, Pulchriphyllium agathyrsus, Pulchriphyllium anangu, Pulchriphyllium bioculatum, and Pulchriphyllium crurifolium. In eggs with reduced or absent wings, the cross-section is more triangular to rounded in the ventral region. The dorsal side is comparatively broad and flat, and in eggs with a more triangular cross-section, it always forms one side of the triangle. Such wingless eggs are found, for example, in Pulchriphyllium giganteum and Pulchriphyllium bhaskarai. The surface of the eggs is rough and spongy. The capsule lacks pinnae, instead exhibiting pits of varying sizes on its surface. The micropylar plate is elongated and extends almost the entire length of the capsule. It is approximately uniform in width, widening only slightly in the region of the micropylar cup. The lid (operculum) is always distinctly raised and usually hill-shaped. It can be one-quarter to one-third the length of the egg capsule in height.

=== Freshly hatched nymphs ===
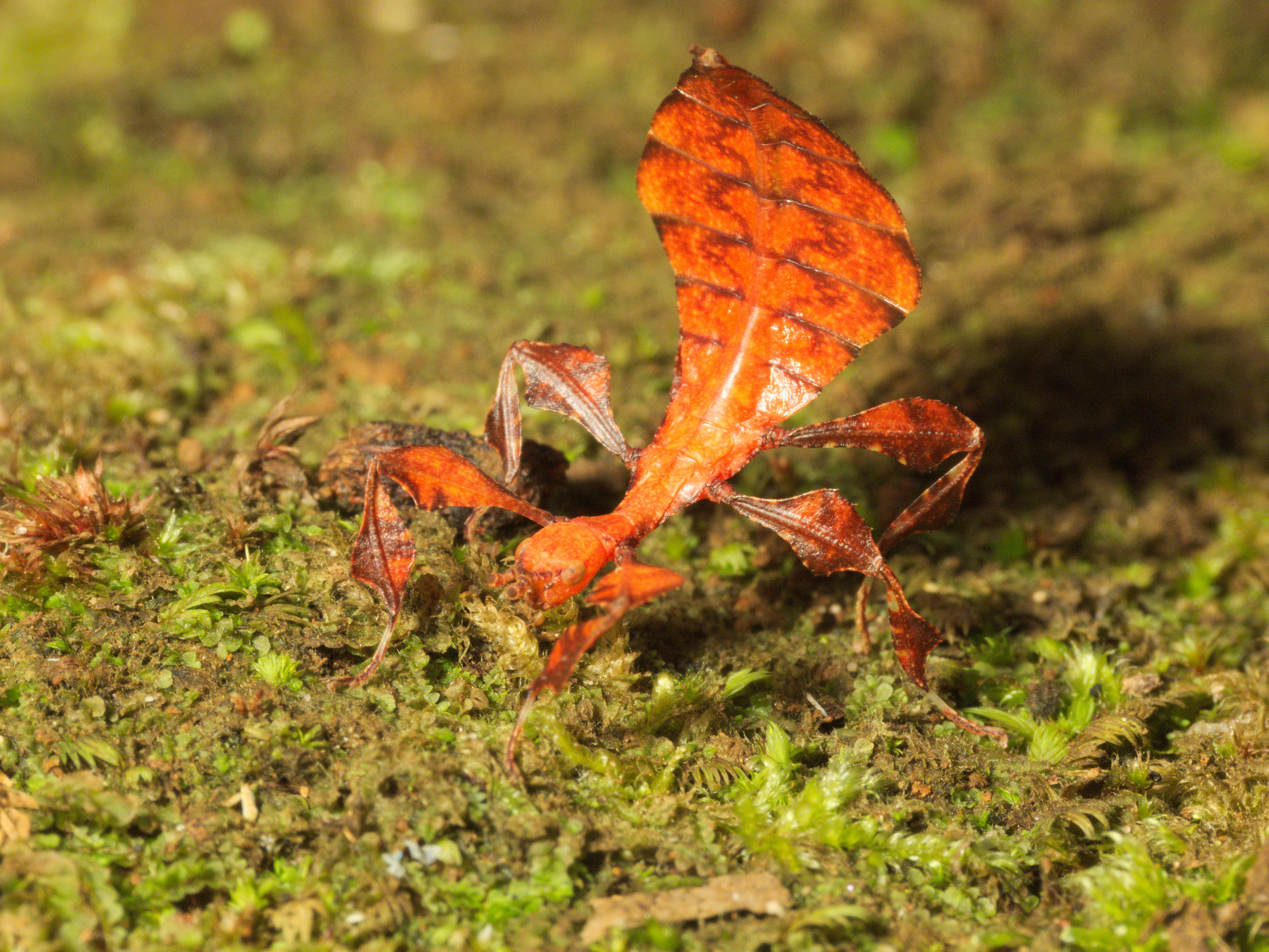
Pulchriphyllium anangu, freshly hatched nymph

Newly hatched nymphs are strikingly orange, red, or reddish-brown, unlike the blackish-brown of Phyllium species. They also lack the typical white markings on the abdomen. Only the basal segments of the tarsi often show a light coloration. The abdomen is noticeably broad, often as wide as, or only slightly narrower than, its length at its widest point. Unlike Phyllium species, the outer lobes of the forelegs (profemular exterior lobes) are broad, and the outer lobes of the mid and hind tibiae (meso- and metatibial exterior lobes) are well-developed.

== Occurrence ==
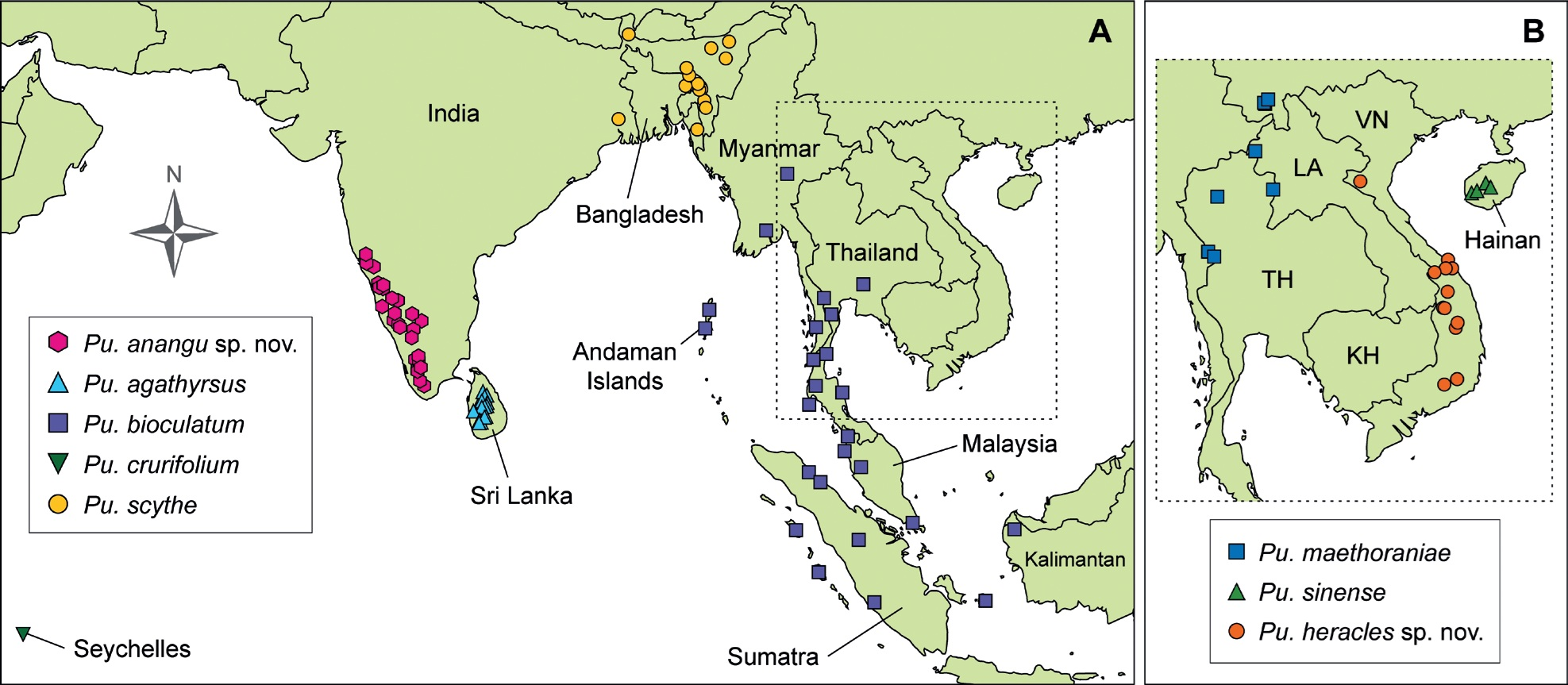
Distribution map of some Pulchriphyllium species following Cumming et al.

The distribution area of the genus Pulchriphyllium extends from the Seychelles through Sri Lanka, India, Bangladesh, and large parts of Southeast Asia. It lies west of the Wallace Line but does not include the Philippines. Most species occur in the eastern part of the range, specifically on Borneo, from where nine species have been described. One species is found in the Seychelles, another in Sri Lanka, one in India, two in Thailand, and two to four on the Malay Peninsula. One additional species each comes from Vietnam, Bangladesh, and Hainan Island (part of China). Three species are known from Sumatra and two from Java. Since both the species found in Vietnam and those in Thailand have locations near the border of Laos, the genus is likely also present there. A similar situation exists in Cambodia, which is surrounded by these countries. Pulchriphyllium giganteum is believed to have the largest distribution area. Molecular genetic studies have confirmed the presence of this species on the Malay Peninsula and Borneo. It is also said to occur in Thailand and Sumatra.

== Taxonomy ==
- Pu.
  - - Pulchriphyllium bhaskarai
    - - Pulchriphyllium rimiae
      - - Pulchriphyllium shurei
        - Pulchriphyllium mannani
  - - Pulchriphyllium giganteum Malay Peninsula
      = Pulchriphyllium giganteum Kalimantan
    - - Pulchriphyllium heracles
      - - - Pulchriphyllium agathyrsus
          - Pulchriphyllium anangu
        - - - Pulchriphyllium sinense
            - Pulchriphyllium maethoraniae
          - - Pulchriphyllium delislei
            - - Pulchriphyllium pulchrifolium
              - - Pulchriphyllium agnesagamaae
                - - - Pulchriphyllium abdulfatahi
                    - Pulchriphyllium fredkugani
                  - Pulchriphyllium bioculatum Malay Peninsula
                    = Pulchriphyllium bioculatum Siberut
                    = Pulchriphyllium bioculatum Kalimantan

Relationships of the Pulchriphyllium species examined so far by genetic analysis according to Cumming et al. (2023)

Achille Griffini described Pulchriphyllium in 1898 as a subgenus of Phyllium for Phyllium pulchrifolium, Phyllium scythe, and Phyllium bioculatum. The type species was Phyllium pulchrifolium, described in 1838. A species already described in 1802 by Pierre André Latreille as Phyllium longicorne was long overlooked and only recognized as a synonym of Pulchriphyllium bioculatum in 2025. Since Pulchriphyllium bioculatum had been valid since the species' description in 1832, it was decided to classify Phyllium longicorne as a forgotten name (nomen oblitum) and give precedence to the more recent but more common name.

William Forsell Kirby first established Pulchriphyllium as a genus in 1904. In addition to the three original species, he included four other species described before 1898 in this genus: Pulchriphyllium agathyrsus, Pulchriphyllium crurifolium, and their later synonyms Pulchriphyllium dardanus and Pulchriphyllium gelonus. Since 1976, Pulchriphyllium has again been considered a subgenus. Between 1990 and 2018, twelve additional species were described within this subgenus. Two of these later proved to be representatives of the genus Nanophyllium. Several other members of this genus were also temporarily placed in the subgenus Pulchriphyllium. The current Pulchriphyllium giganteum was first assigned to the subgenus Pulchriphyllium by Detlef Größer in 2001. Frank H. Hennemann et al. divided the genus Phyllium into species groups. The five species of the subgenus Pulchriphyllium recognized at the time placed them in the bioculatum species group. Between 2015 and 2018, nine more species were described in the subgenus, seven of them were described by Francis Seow-Choen.

Sarah Bank et al., in their 2021 publication on phylogeny and historical biogeography, conducted molecular genetic analyses on samples of various leaf insects. These included samples from species of the subgenus Pulchriphyllium. They identified 14 species, two of which were previously undescribed. Due to the status of these 14 species, the subgenus was elevated to genus status. A 2023 publication lists a total of 16 species distinguished by genetic analysis, including four newly described species.

The name "Pulchriphyllium" means "beautiful leaf" and is composed of the Latinized name Phyllium, the type genus of the family (from the Greek φυλλον, -ου (phyllon, -oy)), and the prefix "Pulchri", from the Latin word for "beautiful". Like Phyllium, Pulchriphyllium is also neuter.

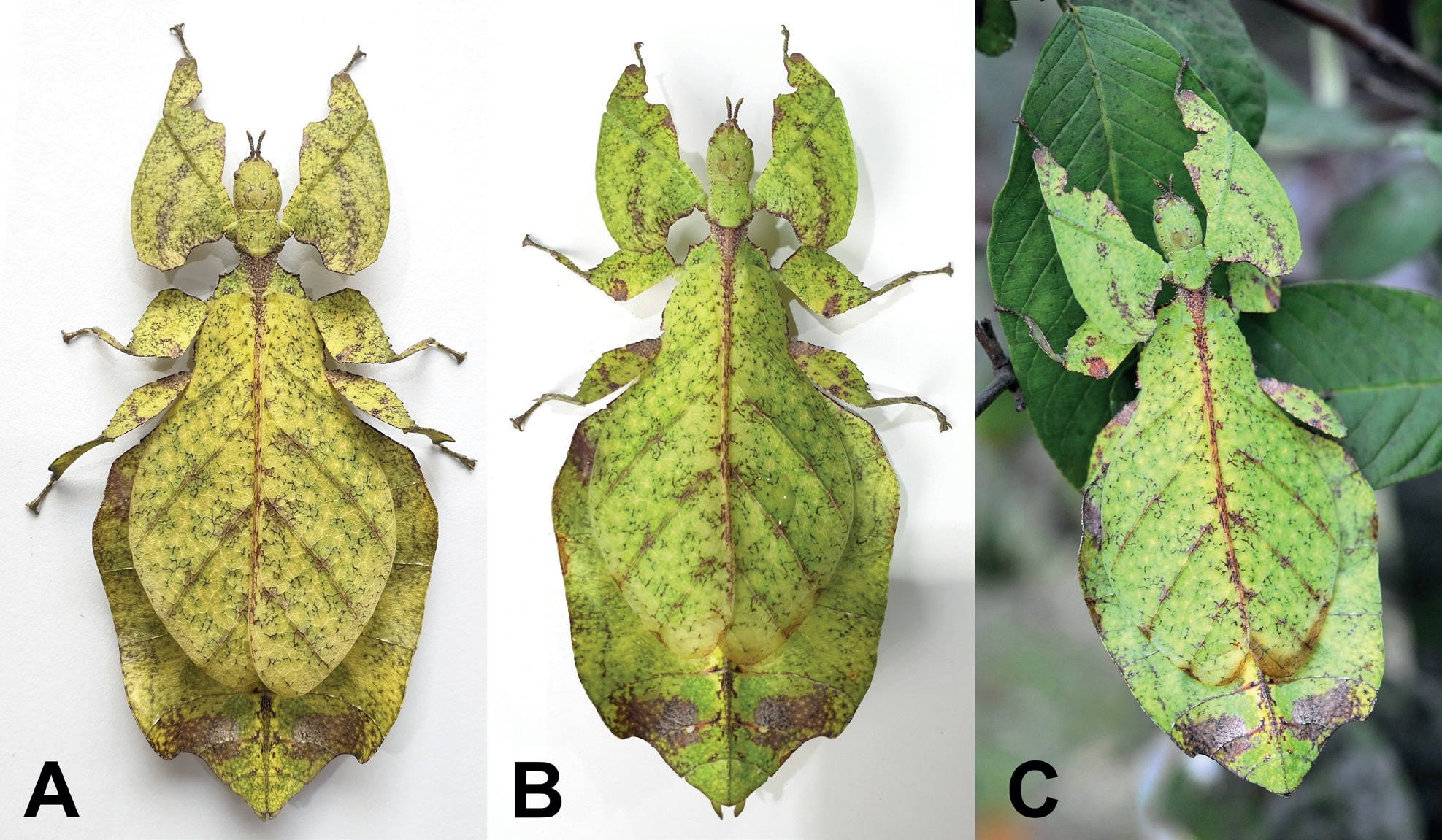
Pulchriphyllium bhaskarai, the later female holotype

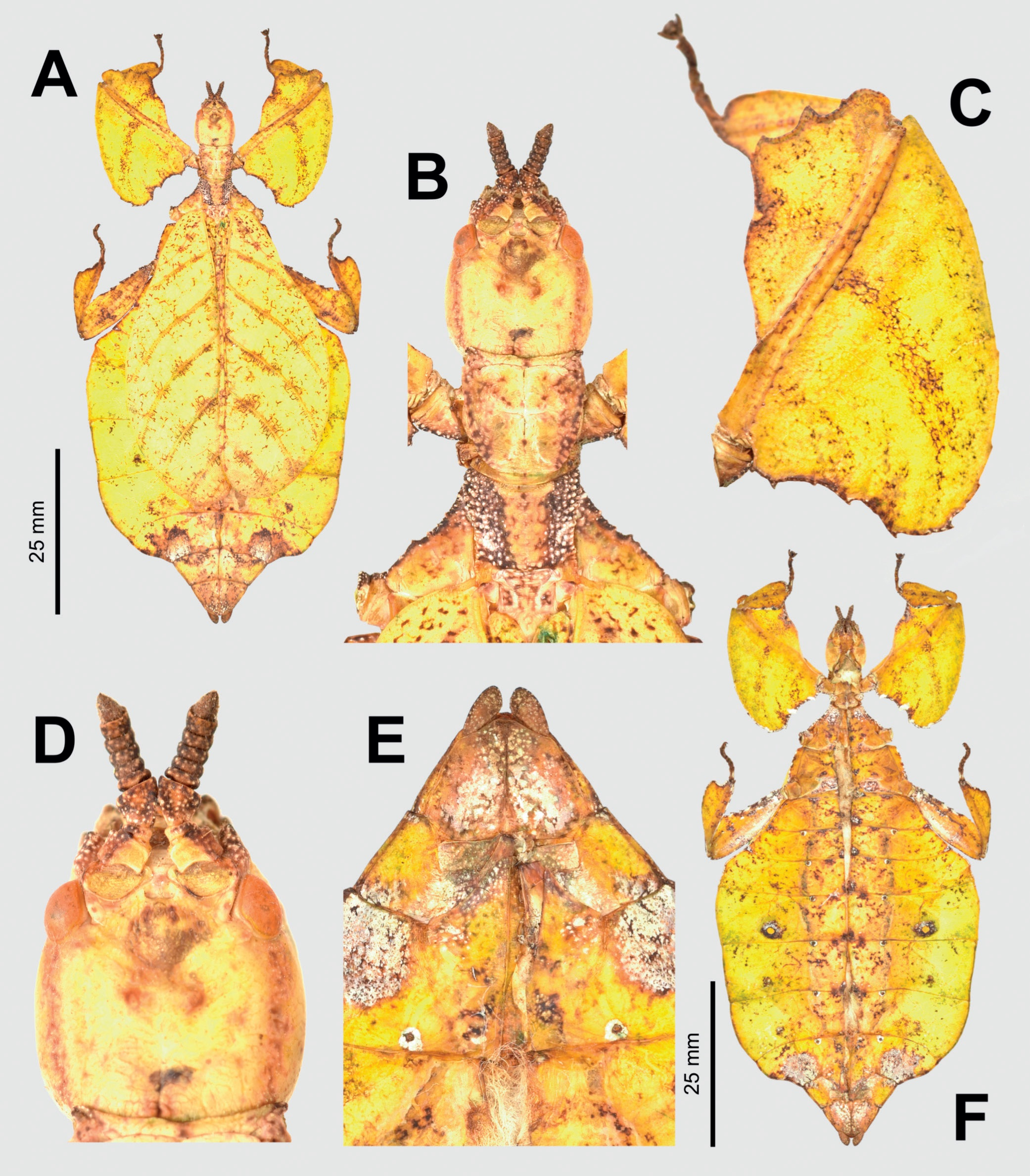
Pulchriphyllium delislei, female paratype

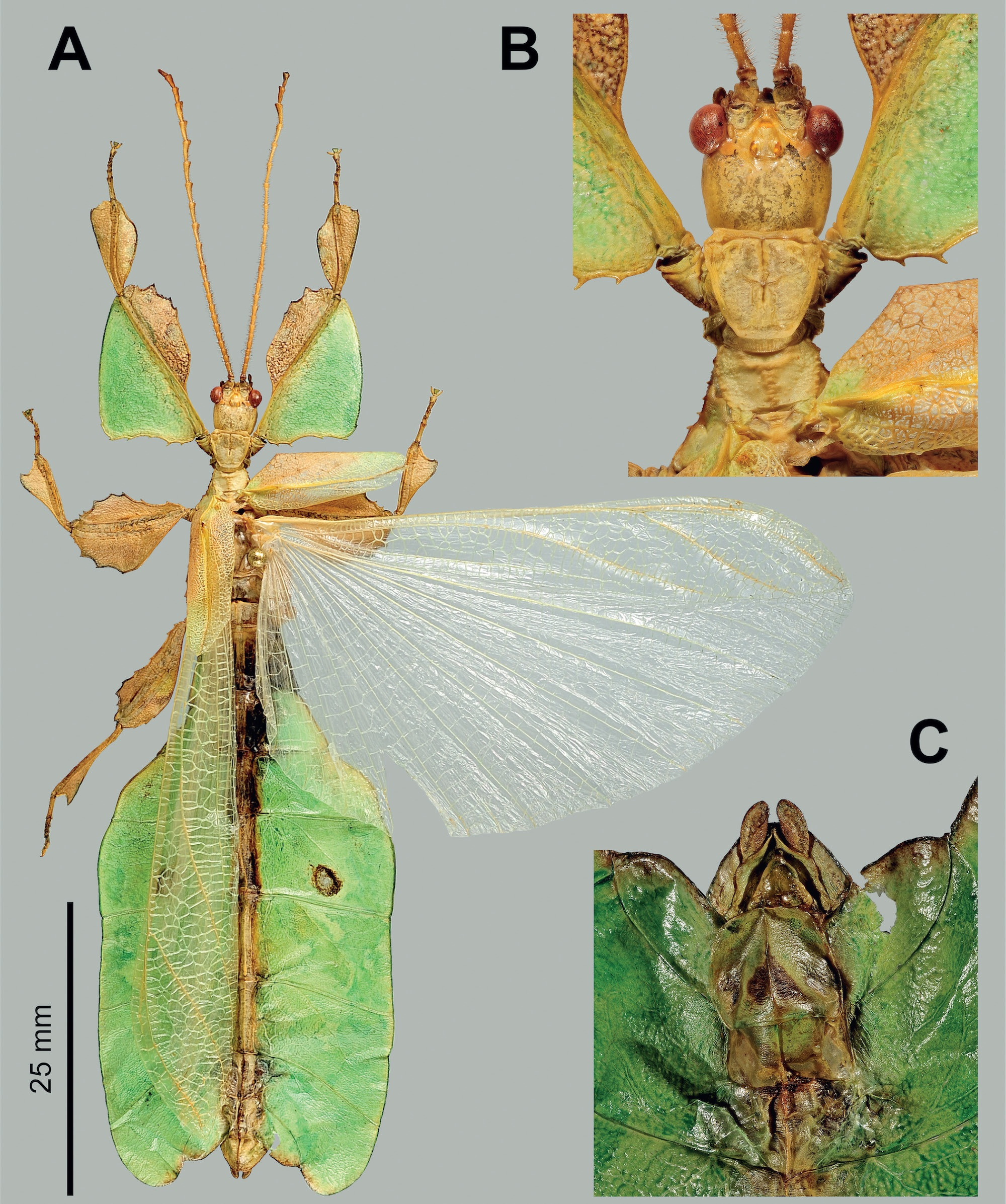
Pulchriphyllium heracles, male holotype

The genus Pulchriphyllium currently comprises the following 20 species:

- Pulchriphyllium abdulfatahi (Seow-Choen, 2017) - N Borneo
- Pulchriphyllium agathyrsus (Gray, G.R., 1843) - Sri Lanka
- Pulchriphyllium agnesagamaae (Seow-Choen, 2017) - N Borneo
- Pulchriphyllium anangu Cumming, Le Tirant, Linde, Solan, Foley, Eulin, Lavado, Whiting, Bradler & Bank, 2023 - Indien
- Pulchriphyllium bhaskarai Cumming, Le Tirant, Linde, Solan, Foley, Eulin, Lavado, Whiting, Bradler & Bank, 2023 - Java
- Pulchriphyllium bioculatum (Gray, G.R., 1832) - Malay Peninsula and Sumatra
  (with Phyllium longicorne Latreille, 1802 as Nomen oblitum)
- Pulchriphyllium crurifolium (Audinet-Serville, 1838) - Seychellen
  (Syn. = Phyllium dardanus Westwood, 1859)
  (Syn. = Phyllium gelonus Gray, 1843)
- Pulchriphyllium delislei Cumming, Le Tirant, Linde, Solan, Foley, Eulin, Lavado, Whiting, Bradler & Bank, 2023 - S Borneo
- Pulchriphyllium detlefgroesseri (Seow-Choen, 2017) - N Borneo
- Pulchriphyllium fredkugani (Seow-Choen, 2017) - N Borneo
- Pulchriphyllium giganteum (Hausleithner, 1984) - Thailand, Malay Peninsula, Sumatra and Borneo
- Pulchriphyllium heracles Cumming, Le Tirant, Linde, Solan, Foley, Eulin, Lavado, Whiting, Bradler & Bank, 2023 - Vietnam
- Pulchriphyllium lambirensis (Seow-Choen, 2017) - O Borneo
- Pulchriphyllium maethoraniae (Delfosse, 2015) - Thailand
- Pulchriphyllium mannani (Seow-Choen, 2017) - N Borneo (and Malay Peninsula?)
- Pulchriphyllium pulchrifolium (Serville, 1838) - type species (as Phyllium pulchrifolium Serville) - Sumatra and Java
  (Syn. = Phyllium magdelainei Lucas, 1857)
- Pulchriphyllium rimiae (Seow-Choen, 2017) - N Borneo (and Malay Peninsula?)
- Pulchriphyllium scythe (Gray, R.G., 1843) - Bangladesh
- Pulchriphyllium shurei (Cumming & Le Tirant, 2018) - Java
- Pulchriphyllium sinense (Liu, 1990) - Hainan

Following the results of Bank et al. 2021, the sister genera of Pulchriphyllium are the genera Microphyllium and Pseudomicrophyllium. These three genera form a common clade with the genus Phyllium. Royce T. Cumming and Stéphane Le Tirant, who were co-authors of this work, reclassified the genus in 2022, based on the results of further investigations and morphological characteristics using Bayesian inference, and placed Pulchriphyllium in a clade with the genera Chitoniscus, Vaabonbonphyllium, and Rakaphylliumand thus not in a clade with Microphyllium and Pseudomicrophyllium. Another molecular genetic classification of the genus, which omits the genera Acentetaphyllium, Rakaphyllium, and Vaabonbonphyllium, showed again that Microphyllium and Pseudomicrophyllium are the sister genera of Pulchriphyllium and that these form a common clade with Phyllium. The next higher clade includes the genus Cryptophyllium (see also Cladogram of the Phylliidae).

== Terraristics ==
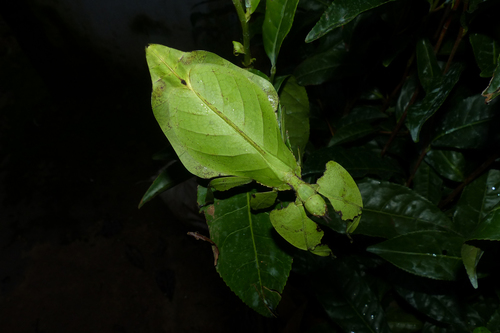
Pulchriphyllium anangu, female

Representatives of the present-day genus Pulchriphyllium have been in captivity since the 1970s. The Phasmid Study Group lists species under PSG numbers 10, 59, 60, 72, and 77. PSG No. 10 is Pulchriphyllium pulchrifolium, which was introduced from Java in the 1970s and is still reportedly being sexually bred. It was temporarily synonymized with Pulchriphyllium bioculatum. Conversely, PSG No. 59 and 60, which were temporarily designated as Pulchriphyllium pulchrifolium, are Pulchriphyllium bioculatum stocks that were introduced from Sri Lanka in the late 1970s (PSG No. 59) and from Tapah Hills in the Malay Peninsula in the early 1980s (PSG No. 60), respectively. Since Pulchriphyllium bioculatum is not known to occur in Sri Lanka, the no-longer-cultured stock with PSG No. 59 could have been the native Sri Lankan Pulchriphyllium agathyrsus. The sexual stock of Pulchriphyllium bioculatum listed under PSG No. 77, which was imported from the Malay Peninsula in the mid-1980s, is also no longer in culture. PSG No. 72 is Pulchriphyllium giganteum, which has been continuously and almost always purely parthenogenetically cultured since its discovery. This species was imported from several locations on the Malay Peninsula, such as the Cameron Highlands and, in 2014, the Tapah Hills. The most recently described Pulchriphyllium anangu from India and Pulchriphyllium bhaskarai from Gunung Halimun National Park in Java have also been in culture since their discovery.

Depending on the species and stage of development, suitable forage plants include oak, hazel, bramble, Psidium guajava (guava), and Gaultheria shallon (salal).
