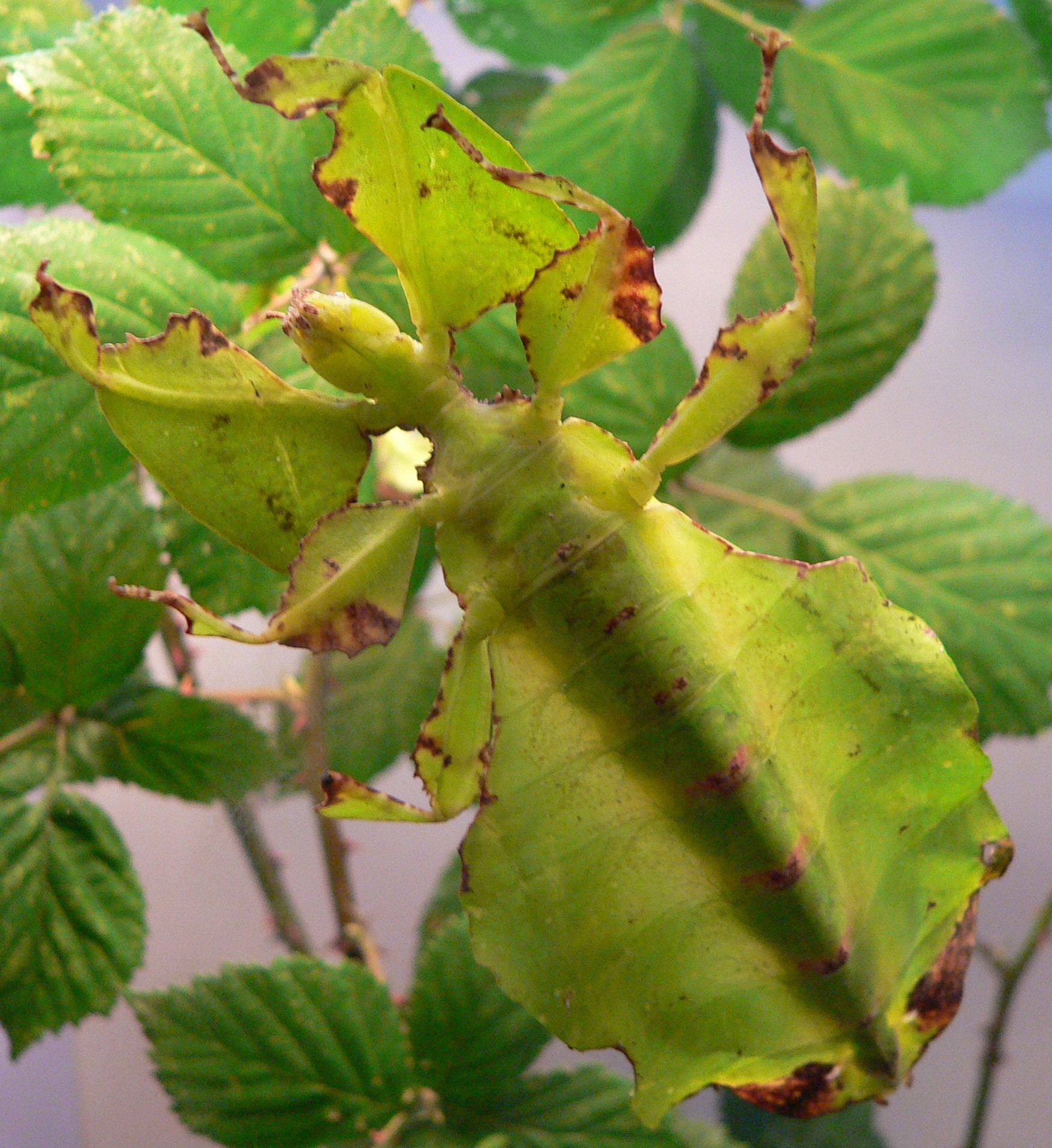
- A female Pulchriphyllium bioculatum

Conservation status
- Least Concern (IUCN 3.1)

Scientific classification
- Kingdom: Animalia
- Phylum: Arthropoda
- Clade: Pancrustacea
- Class: Insecta
- Order: Phasmatodea
- Family: Phylliidae
- Genus: Pulchriphyllium
- Species: P. bioculatum

Binomial name
- Pulchriphyllium bioculatum (G.R. Gray, 1832)

Synonyms
- Phyllium bioculatum G. R. Gray, 1832; Phyllium longicorne Latreille, 1802 (Nomen oblitum)

= Pulchriphyllium bioculatum =

Species of leaf insect

Pulchriphyllium bioculatum, also Gray's leaf insect, is a leaf insect native to Sumatra and the southern part of Malay Peninsula. Its specific epithet bioculatum means "two-eyed" in Latin and refers to the two dots located on the abdomen in this species.

== Description ==
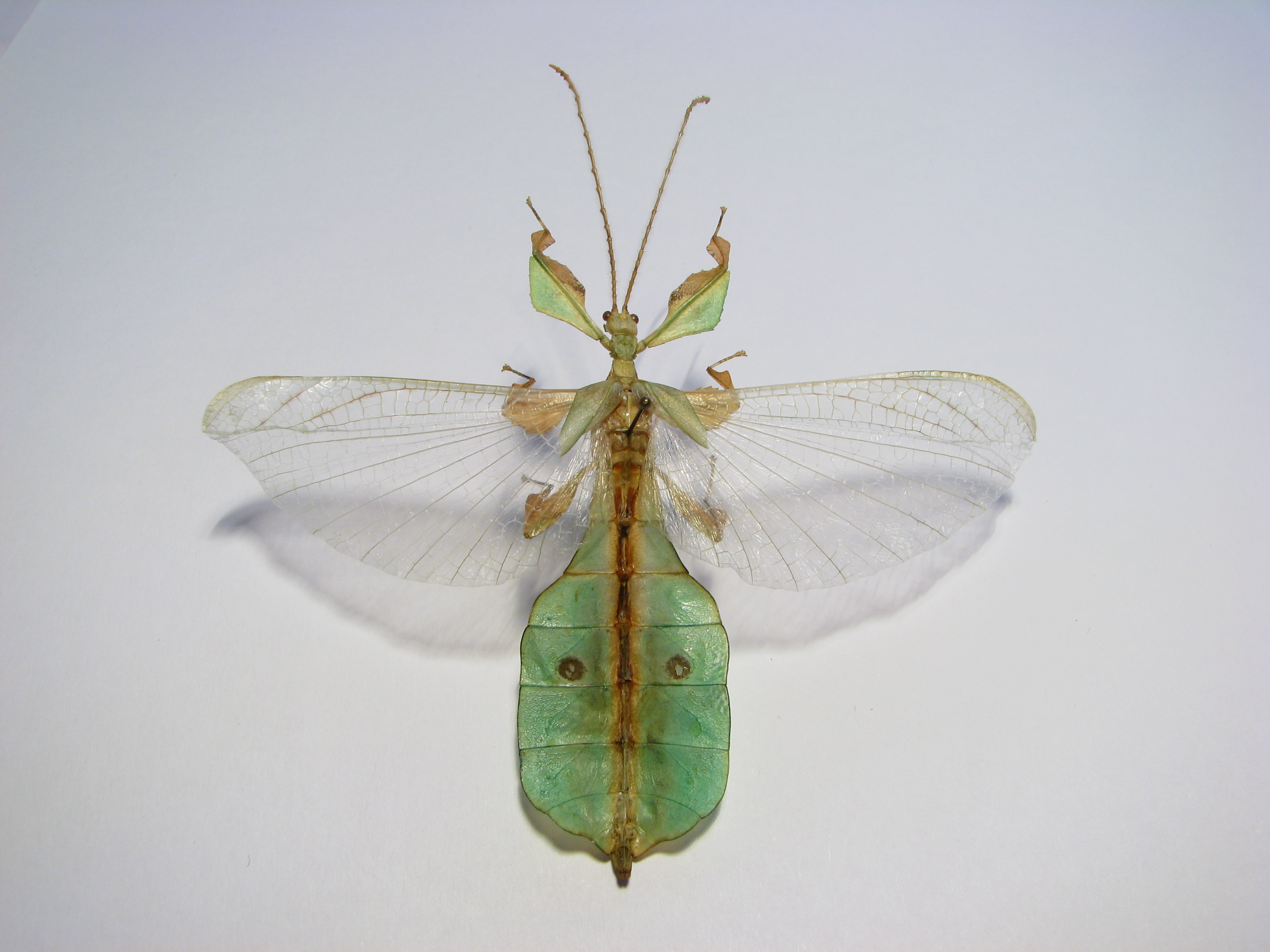
A closer view of a male P. bioculatum with its visible wings (note also the two namesake dots)

The insect has green, broad body and legs and frequently has spots. Both females and males occur in shades of green, yellow, and orange. Males range from 50 to 68 millimetres (2.0 to 2.7 in). The organism's forewings and camouflage are used for defense. The antennae of the females are very short, while those of the male are longer. Adult females are 67 to 94 millimetres (2.6 to 3.7 in) in length. The species also has hind wings which are used for flying by males, but are unused by females. Young Pulchriphyllium bioculatum are about 20 millimetres (0.79 in) long, dark red in colour and have reflex immobility. The species molts 5–6 times in a lifetime. Females are heavy-bodied and flightless, and each lays about 500 eggs in a lifetime. The abdomen is narrower at the base, and the femur of the fore legs are dilated.

== Taxonomy ==
The species was described in 1832 by George Robert Gray as Phyllium bioculatum. It was first the first phasmid he discovered. A male specimen is held as the holotype in the Oxford University Museum of Natural History. Data regarding its location or date of collection are unknown. The species name refers to the two eyespots on the abdomen of the holotype. Since 1904, the species has been assigned to the subgenus Pulchriphyllium, established by Achille Griffini in 1898. Since 2021, this subgenus has held genus status, thus renaming Phyllium (Pulchriphyllium) bioculatum to Pulchriphyllium bioculatum. The division into various subspecies and the assignment of other species as synonyms have varied considerably in the past.

Phyllium pulchrifolium (now Pulchriphyllium pulchrifolium (Serville, 1838)) from Java and Sumatra was considered a synonym or subspecies of Pulchriphyllium bioculatum between 1999 and 2018. It was only in 2018 that it was revalidated by Francis Seow-Choen. Its synonym Phyllium magdelainei (Lucas, 1857), was consequently also temporarily considered as a synonym of Phyllium bioculatum between 1976 and 2018.

Phyllium agathyrsus (now Pulchriphyllium agathyrsus (Gray, G. R., 1843)) from Sri Lanka was considered from 1906 to 2018, depending on the author, either as a separate species or a synonym of Pulchriphyllium bioculatum or Pulchriphyllium pulchrifolium.

Phyllium scythe (now Pulchriphyllium scythe (Gray, G. R., 1843)) from Bangladesh and Phyllium crurifolium (now Pulchriphyllium crurifolium (Serville, 1838)) from the Seychelles were regarded as synonyms or subspecies of Phyllium bioculatum between 1995 and 2023. The synonyms Phyllium dardanus Westwood, 1859 and Phyllium gelonus (Gray, G. R., 1843) belonging to Pulchriphyllium crurifolium were therefore also temporarily assigned to Pulchriphyllium bioculatum.

From 2023 to 2025, neither subspecies nor synonyms were assigned to Pulchriphyllium bioculatum. Since 2025, Phyllium longicorne, described by Pierre André Latreille in 1802, has been assigned as a nomen oblitum of Pulchriphyllium bioculatum.

Frank H. Hennemann et al. proposed in 2009 that a classification into species groups be made below the genera or the then-existing subgenera. For Pulchriphyllium bioculatum, the bioculatum species group is proposed here, to which, in addition to Pulchriphyllium agathyrsus, Pulchriphyllium giganteum, Pulchriphyllium pulchrifolium, and Pulchriphyllium sinense must also be assigned.

== Ecology ==
They are slow-moving herbivores and rely on their camouflage and fore wings for defense from predators including birds, amphibians and reptiles. The females live from 4 to 7 months and males from 3 weeks to 1 month.

== Habitat and distribution ==
These leaf insects are found mainly in tropical areas and rainforests where adequate quantities of vegetation are available for consumption. The earlier classification of the now separate species Pulchriphyllium pulchrifolium, Pulchriphyllium scythe, and Pulchriphyllium crurifolium led to the assumption of a very large distribution area. It was thought to extend westward to the Seychelles and Mauritius, eastward and southward to Malaysia, Sumatra, and Java, and northward through India and Sri Lanka to China. Previously mentioned locations such as Borneo, Singapore, Madagascar, and Mauritius also belong to other species. The animals now classified as Pulchriphyllium bioculatum are found only on Sumatra and the islands off its coast, including Bangka Island and Belitung, as well as on the southern part of Malay Peninsula. However, the IUCN Red list considers it endemic to the Seychelles, the Asian records referring to other species.

The preferred temperature for this species is 24–28 °C (75–82 °F), which at night may slightly decrease by 2–3 °C (3.6–5.4 °F). Temperature does not strongly affect the species but will slow development. It is important that the temperature is not reduced below 22 °C (72 °F). Low humidity can cause stress and death.

== Diet ==
As a herbivore Pulchriphyllium bioculatum mainly eats mango, guava, Nephelium lappaceum (Rambutan), and in captivity some accept Quercus (oak) and Rubus (dewberry, raspberry and blackberry) species.

A study was done in Sri Lanka, based on the leaf insect's diet. The specimens mainly fed on guava. Accordingly, the local name for the species in Sri Lanka is pera kolaya (guava leaf). In many places they are colloquially referred to on the basis of what they eat.

== Reproduction and incubation ==
The females lay eggs in months. Incubation takes place from 5–7 months at 25 °C (77 °F). Eggs are beige-brown and about 6–7 mm (0.2–0.3 in).

However, many times the eggs laid are not fertilized due to parthenogenesis. This is a form of asexual reproduction found in females, where growth and development of embryos occurs without fertilization by a male. Eggs are oval or barrel-shaped, like seeds. Different types of oviposition occur in leaf insects. The eggs of this species are catapulted by a backward movement of the abdomen. In a study the ratio of the distance the egg was thrown and the body length of the insect was compared with some other species, which was 24–36. If the eggs are fertilized, then it takes 3–4 months for incubation, otherwise it takes 6 months for unfertilized eggs. Unfertilized eggs hatch out with females only, while fertilized ones may be either male or female. The female lays about 100 eggs at intervals of a few days. The larvae are red at hatching but green within three to seven days. These hatch from eggs laid at a rate of three per day per female.

== In terraristics ==
Pulchriphyllium bioculatum has similar requirements for keeping in a terrarium as other kept species of walking leaves. However, for successful breeding, particular attention must be paid to maintaining the climatic conditions. In addition to a temperature of 24–28 °C (75–82 °F) and a humidity level between 75 and 80 percent, sufficient fresh air supply is essential for successful egg incubation and the survival of the newly hatched nymphs.

Suitable food includes the leafy branches of bramble, raspberries, roses, and oaks, as well as those of guavas, on which the species was successfully kept in Germany as early as the end of the 19th century.

The Phasmid Study Group has listed three to four stocks in the past that have been assigned to this species. A form originating from Java was introduced in the 1970s. It is listed under PSG number 10 and is referred to by some authors as Phyllium bioculatum var. pulchrifolium. Today it is assigned to Pulchriphyllium pulchrifolium. A form introduced from Sri Lanka in the late 1970s is listed under PSG number 59. This breeding stock, whose representatives were sometimes referred to as Phyllium bioculatum var. agathyrsus, is no longer cultivated. Since it originated in Sri Lanka, this stock was likely Pulchriphyllium agathyrsus. A third form, occasionally also referred to as Phyllium agathyrsus, was introduced shortly afterward, in the early 1980s, from West Malaysia, specifically from Tapah Hills. It is now listed as Pulchriphyllium bioculatum under PSG number 60. Another breeding stock, listed under PSG number 77 and imported from West Malaysia in the mid-1980s, is also considered Pulchriphyllium bioculatum. It is considered extinct. The eggs of this breeding stock differed from those of the stock listed under PSG number 59 of Pulchriphyllium pulchrifolium from Java, as well as from those of the animals also from West Malaysia listed as Pulchriphyllium bioculatum under PSG number 60. According to the PSG list, the presumably extinct breeding stock with PSG number 59 from Sri Lanka, as well as the stock from Tapah Hills (PSG number 60) and West Malaysia (PSG number 77), are assigned to Phyllium bioculatum.
