= Morin (flavonol) =

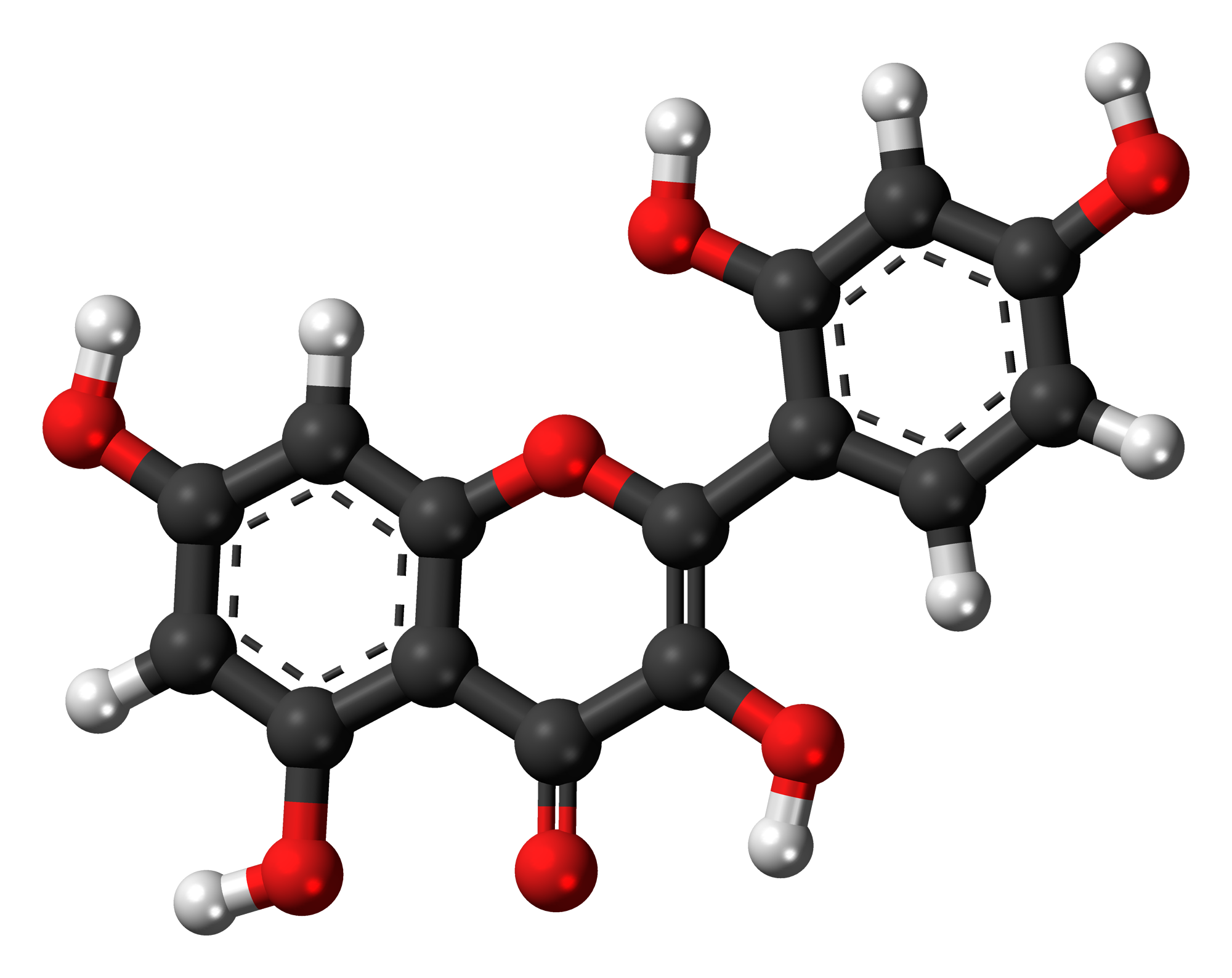

Names
- IUPAC name 2′,3,4′,5,7-Pentahydroxyflavone
- Systematic IUPAC name 2-(2,4-Dihydroxyphenyl)-3,5,7-trihydroxy-4H-1-benzopyran-4-one
- Other names Aurantica; Al-Morin; Morin hydrate Calico Yellow; Toxylon pomiferum Bois d'arc Osage orange extract

Identifiers
| CAS Number | 654055-01-3 |
| 3D model (JSmol) | Interactive image |
| ChEBI | CHEBI:75092 |
| ChEMBL | ChEMBL28626 |
| ChemSpider | 4444989 |
| ECHA InfoCard | 100.006.858 |
| IUPHAR/BPS | 411 |
| KEGG | C10105 |
| PubChem CID | 5281670 |
| CompTox Dashboard (EPA) | DTXSID1022398 |
- InChI: InChI=1S/C15H10O7/c16-6-1-2-8(9(18)3-6)15-14(21)13(20)12-10(19)4-7(17)5-11(12)22-15/h1-5,16-19,21H Key: YXOLAZRVSSWPPT-UHFFFAOYSA-N; InChI=1/C15H10O7/c16-6-1-2-8(9(18)3-6)15-14(21)13(20)12-10(19)4-7(17)5-11(12)22-15/h1-5,16-19,21H Key: YXOLAZRVSSWPPT-UHFFFAOYAH
- SMILES: O=C1c3c(O/C(=C1/O)c2ccc(O)cc2O)cc(O)cc3O

Properties
| Chemical formula | C_{15}H_{10}O_{7} |
| Molar mass | 302.238 g·mol^{−1} |
| Density | 1.799 g/mL |
- Except where otherwise noted, data are given for materials in their standard state (at 25 °C [77 °F], 100 kPa). verify (what is ?) Infobox references

Morin is a yellow chemical compound that can be isolated from Maclura pomifera (Osage orange), Maclura tinctoria (old fustic), and from leaves of Psidium guajava (common guava). In a preclinical in vitro study, morin was found to be a weak inhibitor of fatty acid synthase with an IC_{50} of 2.33 μM. Morin was also found to inhibit amyloid formation by islet amyloid polypeptide (or amylin) and disaggregate amyloid fibers.

Morin can be used to test for the presence of aluminium or tin in a solution, since it forms characteristically fluorescent coordination complexes with them under UV light.

== Glycosides ==
- Morin-3-O-arabinoside
- Morin-3-O-lyxoside
