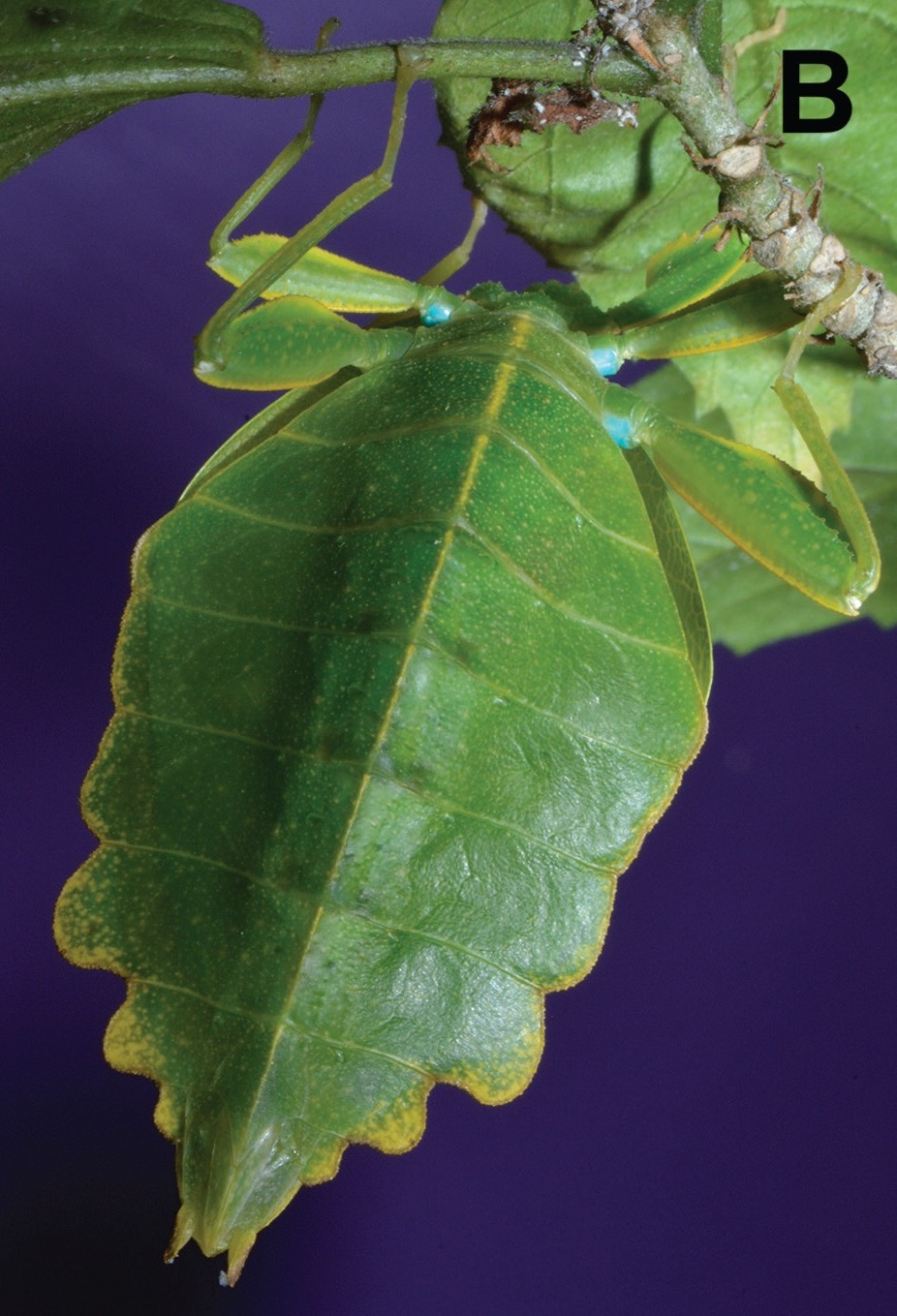
- Chitoniscus sp. “Suva”, ventro-posterior view of their coxae coloration

Scientific classification
- Kingdom: Animalia
- Phylum: Arthropoda
- Clade: Pancrustacea
- Class: Insecta
- Order: Phasmatodea
- Suborder: Euphasmatodea
- Superfamily: Phyllioidea
- Family: Phylliidae
- Genus: Chitoniscus; Stål, 1875

Type species
- * Chitoniscus lobiventris (Blanchard, 1853)

Species
- Chitoniscus feejeeanus; Chitoniscus lobipes; Chitoniscus lobiventris

= Chitoniscus =

Genus of insects

Chitoniscus is a genus of leaf insects native to the Fiji Islands. The species from New Caledonia, formerly listed in this genus, formerly classified in this genus were transferred to the newly described genus Trolicaphyllium in 2021.

== Description ==
Chitoniscus species are relatively small and broad representatives of the leaf insects, measuring 40 to 60 millimetres (1.6 to 2.4 in) in length. Their abdomen tapers to a point in both sexes and is either smooth or strongly lobed. Their eggs are small and lack pinnae. In these morphological characteristics, they resemble members of the genus Trolicaphyllium, which were therefore long classified within the genus Chitoniscus. Differences exist in the development of the inner lobe on the tibiae of the forelegs (protibial interior lobe). In Chitoniscus, this lobe is either completely absent in both sexes or present only in the proximal half, whereas in Trolicaphyllium, it extends over the entire shaft of the inner fore tibiae. Females also differ in the structure of their antennae, whose segments three, eight, and nine are not broadened, unlike those of Trolicaphyllium females. While Chitoniscus females are striking sky-blue coxae, those of Trolicaphyllium females are a similar green to the rest of the body. Male Chitoniscus lack the three ocelli on the vertex between the compound eyes, which are present in many other Phyllioidea species.

== Taxonomy ==
In 1875 Carl Stål established the genus Chitoniscus for the only species Chitoniscus lobiventris which was described as Phyllium lobiventre by Blanchard in 1853, which thus became the type species. In 1877, James Wood-Mason transferred the second species into the genus, Chitoniscus feejeanum (today spelling Chitoniscus feejeeanus). In 1906 Josef Redtenbacher described with Chitoniscus lobipes the third species. Three other species described in the past in this genus or transferred to it are now listed in the 2021 described genus Trolicaphyllium, these are Trolicaphyllium sarrameaense, descriebed as Chitoniscus sarrameaense, Trolicaphyllium brachysoma, descriebed as Phyllium brachysoma and listed as Chitoniscus brachysoma from 1904 to 2021 as well as Trolicaphyllium erosus, descriebed as Chitoniscus erosus. The genus currently only includes the following three species:

- Chitoniscus feejeeanus (Westwood, 1864)
- Chitoniscus lobipes Redtenbacher, 1906)
- Chitoniscus lobiventris (Blanchard, 1853)

Royce T. Cumming et al., in their split of the genus Trolicaphyllium from Chitoniscus, refer, among other things, to an earlier study published in 2021 on the phylogeny of leaf insects. In this study, Sarah Bank, Cumming, and others demonstrated, using molecular genetic investigations, that two samples of the present-day Chitoniscus, namely Chitoniscus feejeeanus and Chitoniscus sp. 'Suva', and two samples of the later Trolicaphyllium, namely Trolicaphyllium brachysoma and Trolicaphyllium sarrameaense, belong to the same clade. However, the two clades are relatively far removed from each other, and the genera are more closely related to other genera than to each other. For example, Chitoniscus is more closely related to the genera Rakaphyllium, Vaabonbonphyllium, and Pulchriphyllium than to any other genera.

== See also ==
- Phylliidae#Tribes, genera and species
