= Chitoniscus lobiventris =

Lobed leaf insect

Scientific classification
- Kingdom: Animalia
- Phylum: Arthropoda
- Class: Insecta
- Order: Phasmatodea
- Family: Phylliidae
- Genus: Chitoniscus
- Species: C. lobiventris

Binomial name
- Chitoniscus lobiventris Blanchard, 1853

Species of insect

Chitoniscus lobiventris, the lobed leaf insect, is an insect species classified within the order Phasmatodea and the family Phylliidae. Initially documented by Blanchard in 1853, its distinguishing feature lies in its leaf-like appearance, a characteristic adaptation for camouflage within its natural habitat. Like many Chitoniscus species, it is found in the South Pacific. The holotype specimen for this species was a male from Viti, Lebouka collected by Émile Blanchard. In August 1903, a female specimen was collected in Carins by R.C.L Perkins. Males and females were also collected in the Kolombangra of the Solomon Islands in April and October by M.Bigger.
