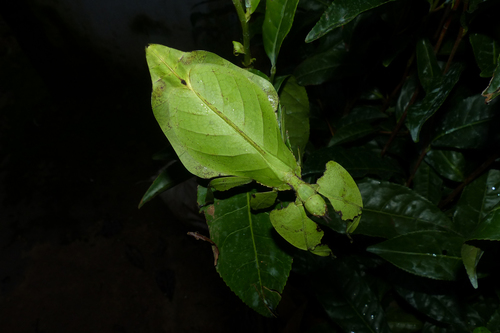

Scientific classification
- Domain: Eukaryota
- Kingdom: Animalia
- Phylum: Arthropoda
- Class: Insecta
- Order: Phasmatodea
- Family: Phylliidae
- Genus: Pulchriphyllium
- Species: P. anangu

Binomial name
- Pulchriphyllium anangu Cumming, Le Tirant, Linde, Solan, Foley, Eulin, Lavado, Whiting, Bradler & Bank, 2023

= Pulchriphyllium anangu =

Species of leaf insect

Pulchriphyllium anangu is a species of leaf insect endemic to the Western Ghats of India. It was described in 2023 and separated from the older treatment which included a widely distributed Phyllium (Pulchriphyllium) bioculatum. The species name is derived from a Yakshi in Tamil mythology.

== Description ==
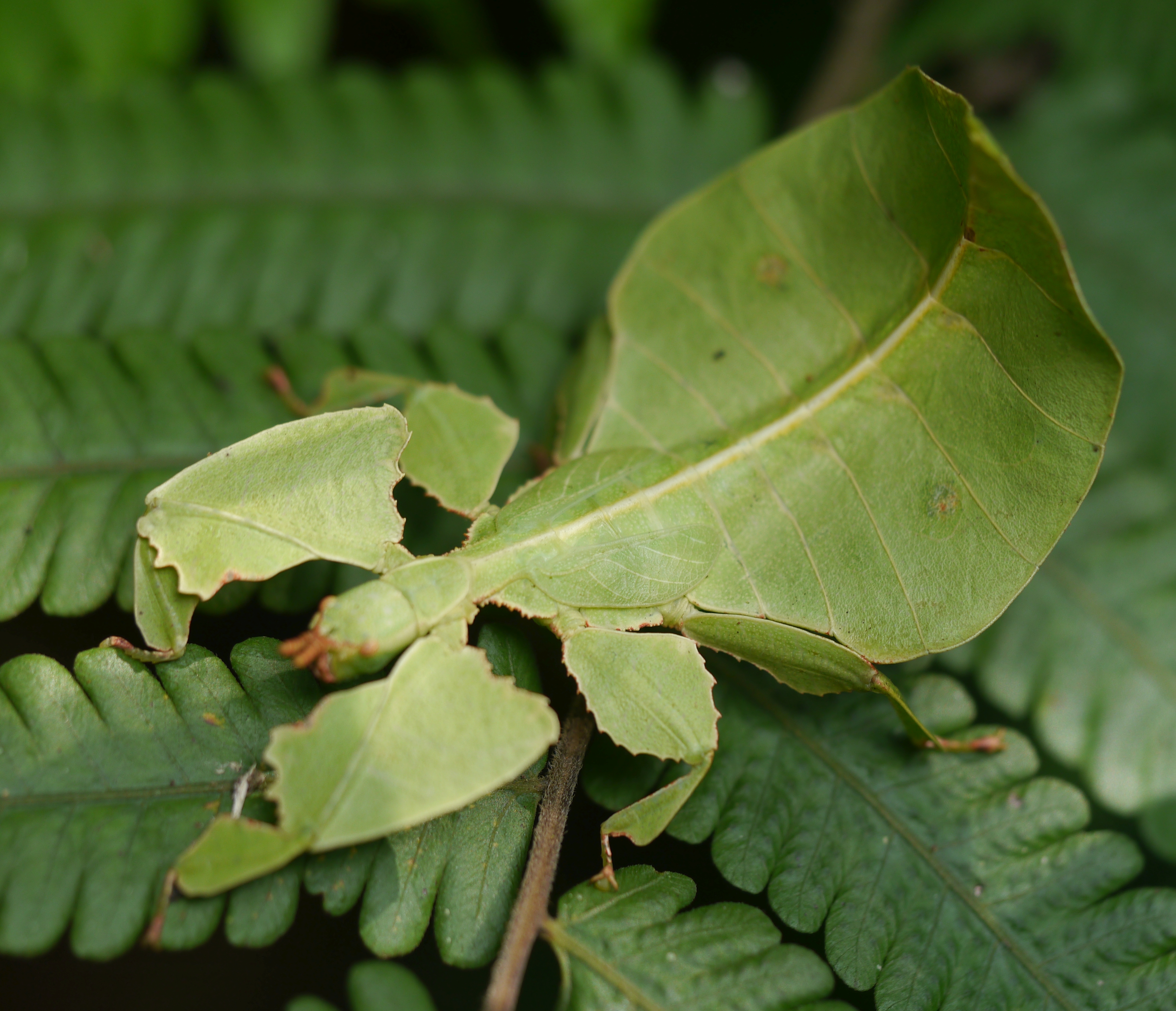
A female

The species is found in the moist forests of the Western Ghats in India, south of Phansad, and has been separated from P. bioculatum (now restricted to Malaysia) and P. agathyrsus of Sri Lanka. The nymphs are red. The egg morphology is undescribed. Several species that were earlier placed under P. bioculatum were split in 2023 and P. anangu was noted for a greater level of serration on the proximal margin of the prefemoral lobe. They have antennae with nine segments and some of them vary in colour with darker patches on the abdomen, tegmina and femora.

The specific name anangu is based on a forest spirit or Yakshi in Tamil mythology associated with mango trees as the species is almost mythical in being rarely seen and has often been found on mango trees.

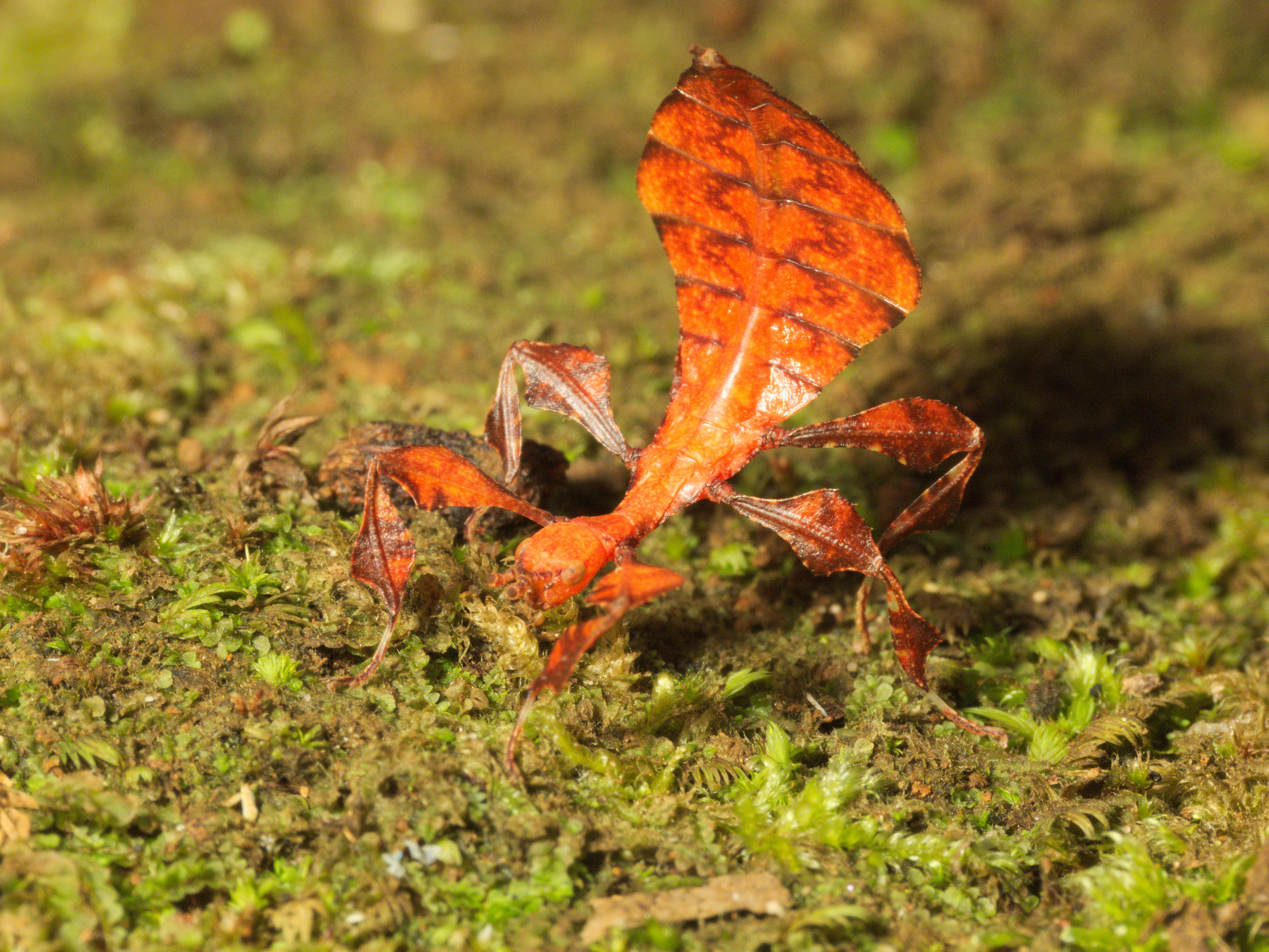
Nymphs are red

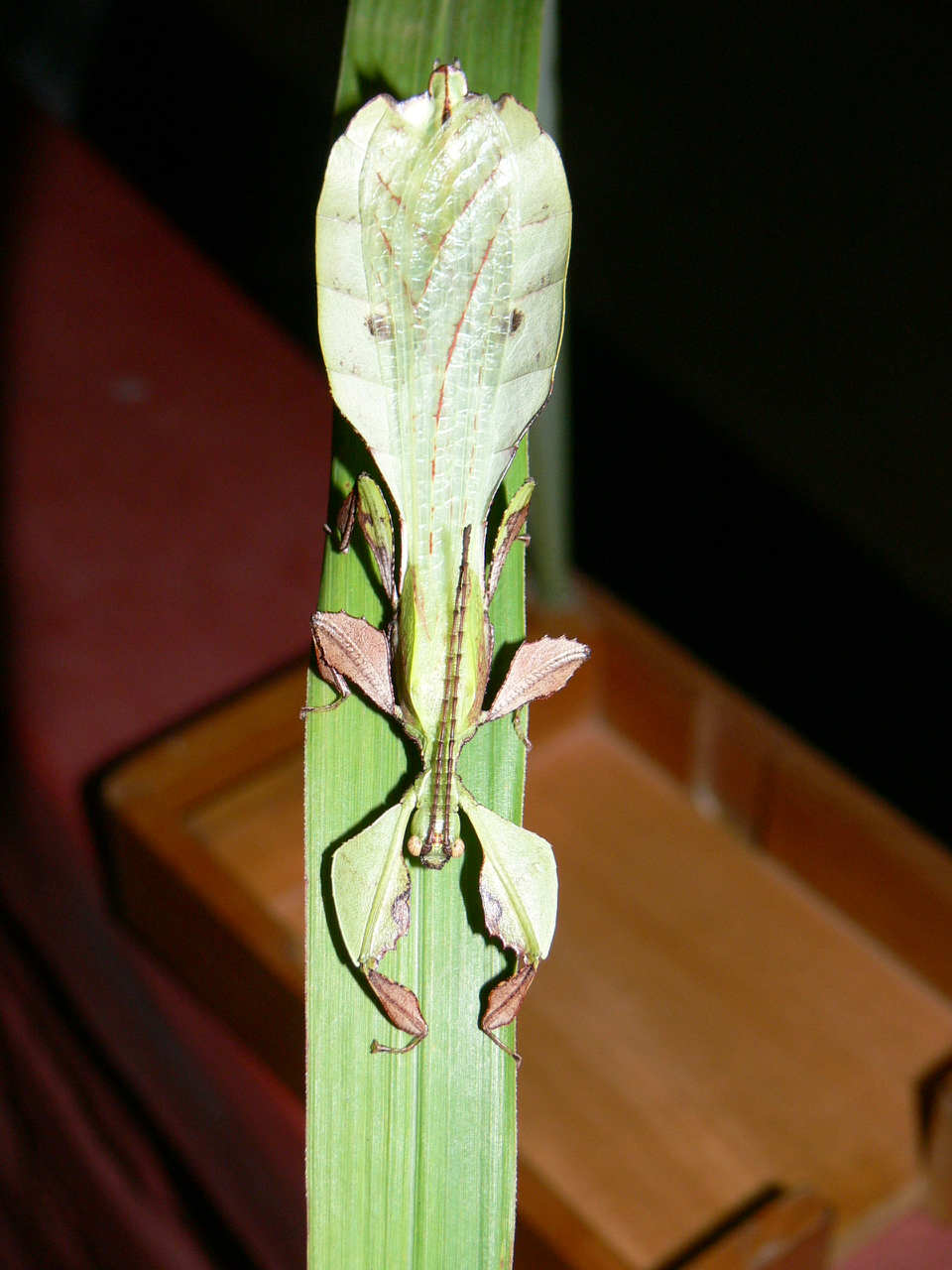
A male
