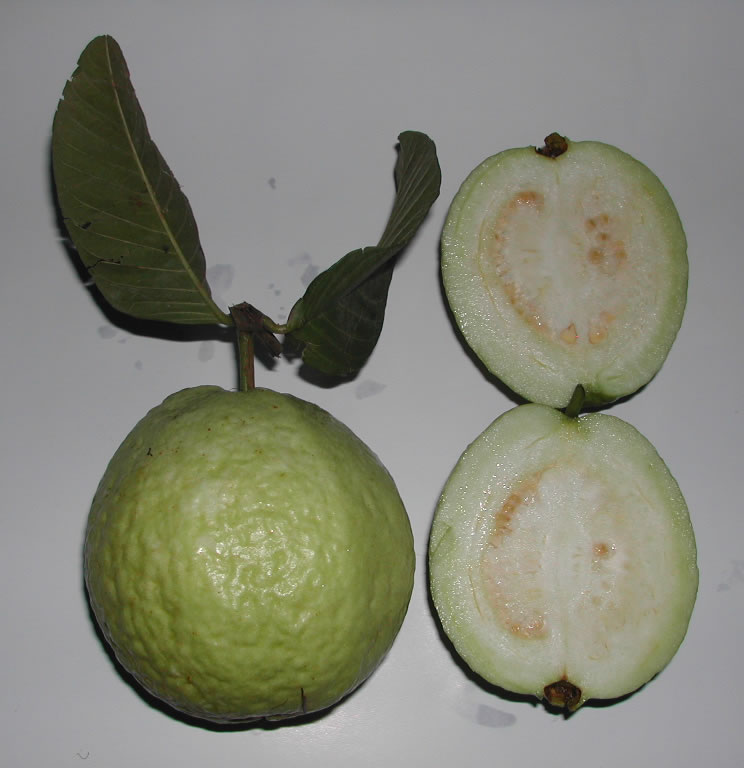
- Common guava fruit

Conservation status
- Least Concern (IUCN 3.1)

Scientific classification
- Kingdom: Plantae
- Clade: Tracheophytes
- Clade: Angiosperms
- Clade: Eudicots
- Clade: Rosids
- Order: Myrtales
- Family: Myrtaceae
- Genus: Psidium
- Species: P. guajava

Binomial name
- Psidium guajava L.

= Psidium guajava =

Common guava

Species of flowering plant

Psidium guajava, the common guava, yellow guava, lemon guava, or apple guava is an evergreen shrub or small tree native to South America. It is pollinated by insects. When cultivated, it is pollinated mainly by the common honey bee, Apis mellifera.

== Description ==
Widely cultivated in tropical and subtropical regions around the world, guava fruits can range in size from as small as an apricot to as large as a grapefruit. Various cultivars have white, pink, or red flesh; a few varieties feature red (instead of green or yellow) skin.

When cultivated from seed, guavas are notable for their extremely slow growth rate for several months, before a very rapid acceleration in growth rate takes over. From seed, common guavas may bloom and set fruit in as few as two years or as many as eight. Cuttings, grafting, and air layering are more commonly used as a propagation method in commercial groves. Highly adaptable, guavas can be easily grown as container plants in temperate regions, though their ability to bloom and set fruit is somewhat less predictable.

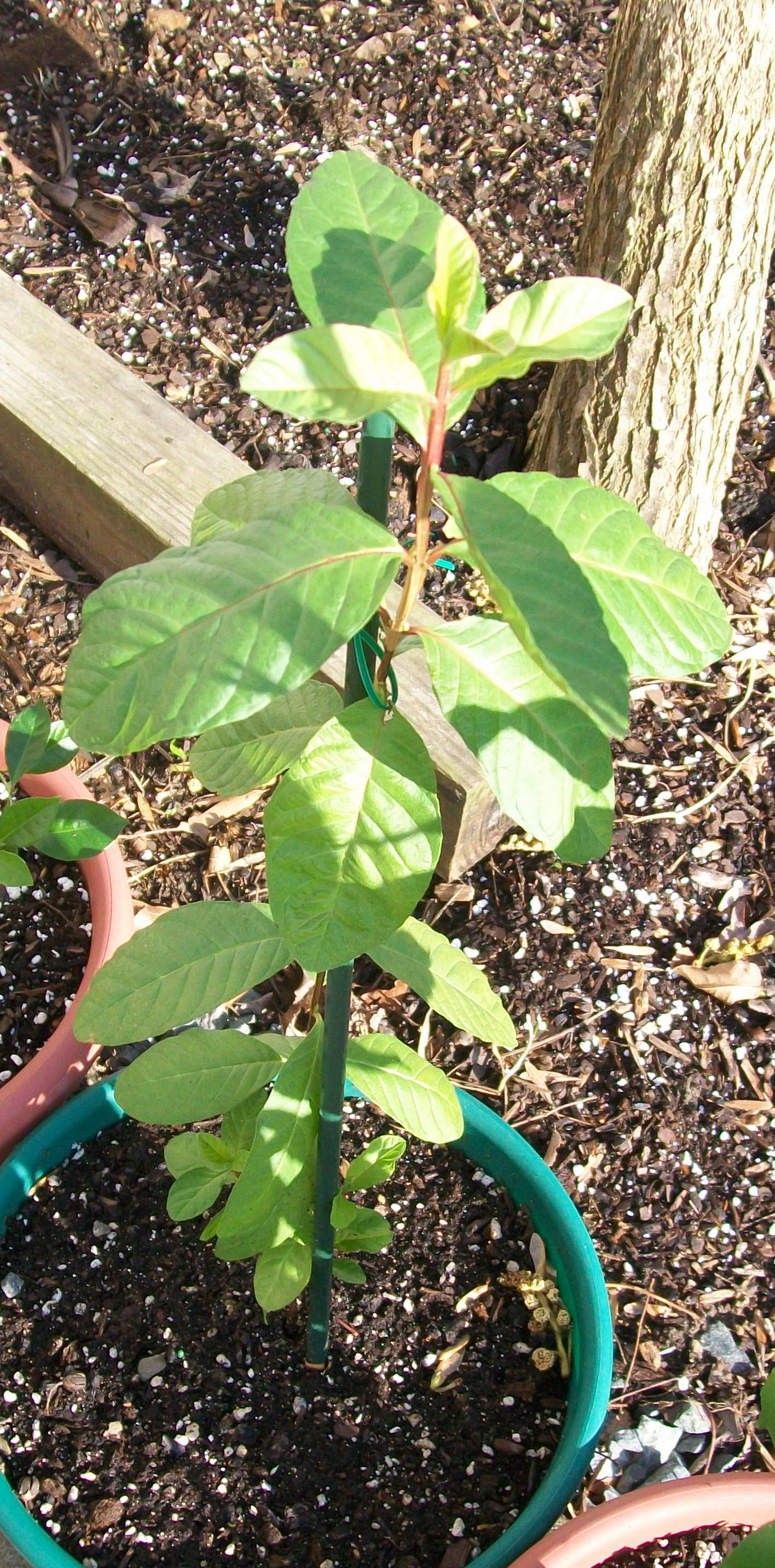
Seedling, 14 months

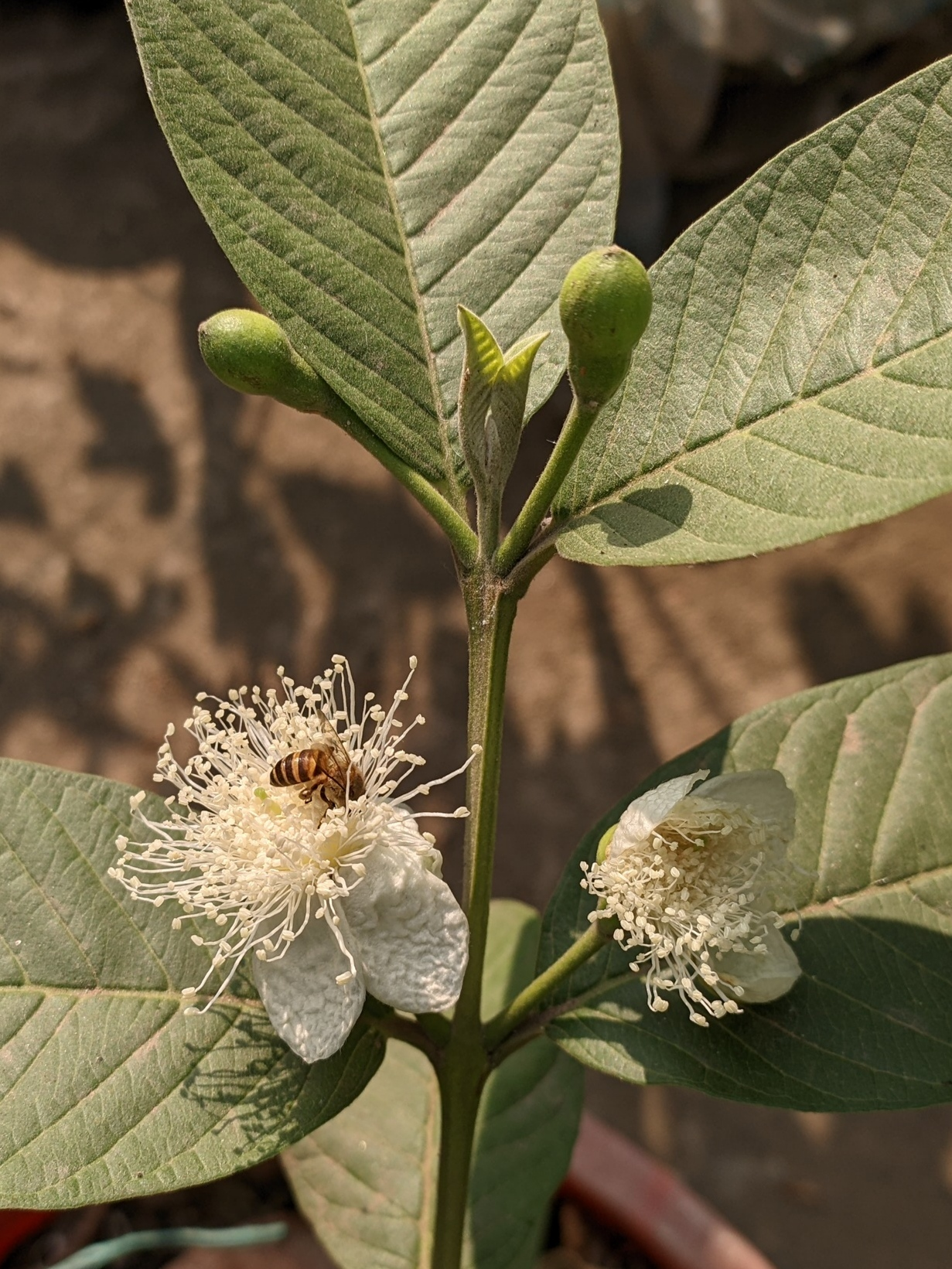
Honey bee on a P. guajava flower

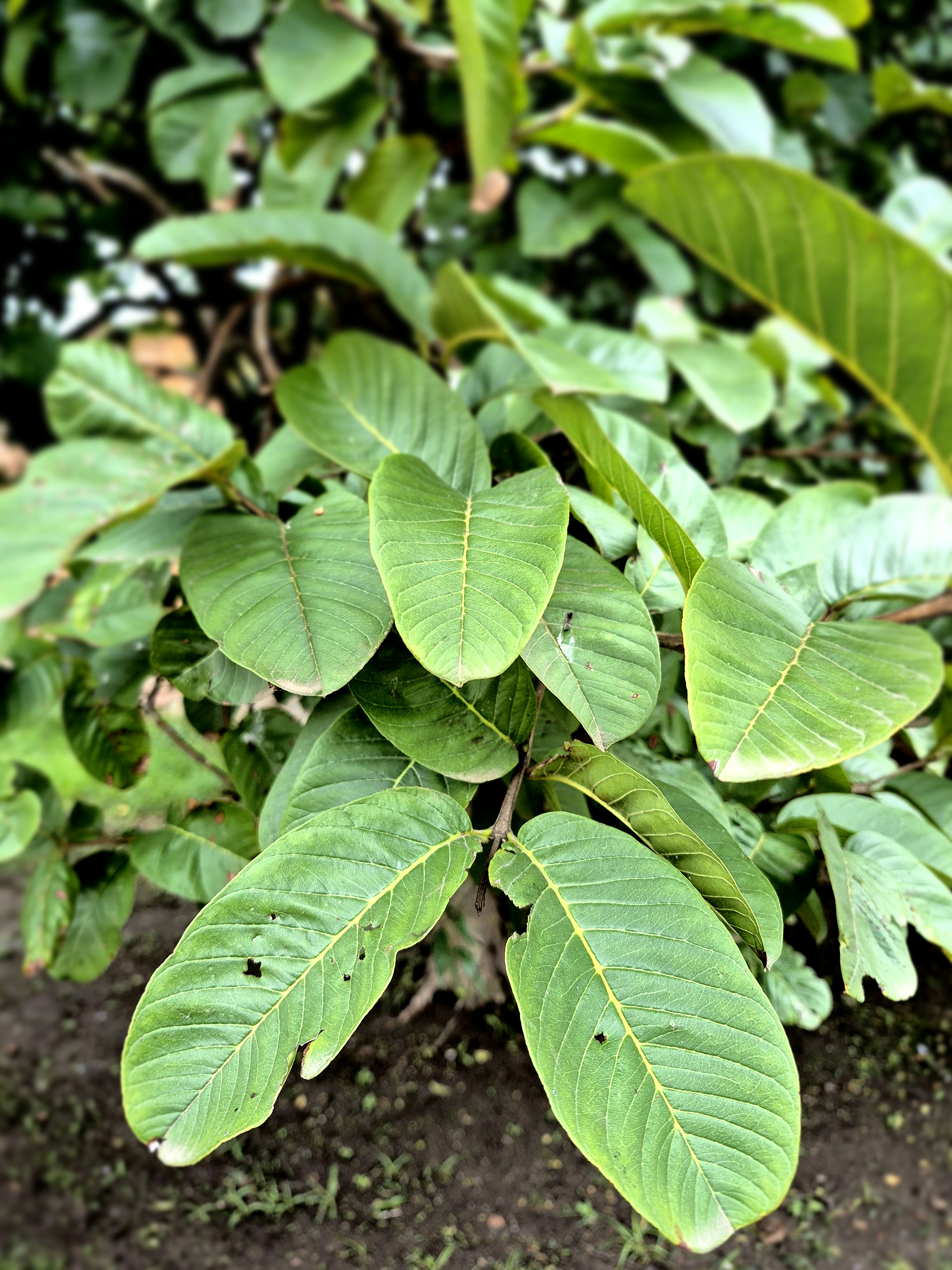
Leaves

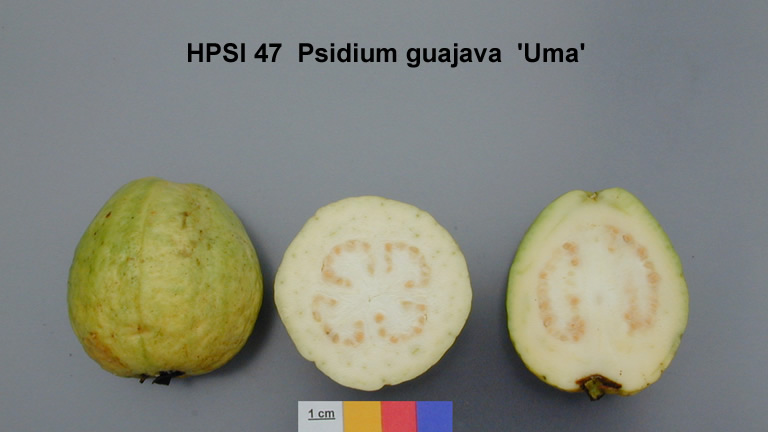
P. guajava fruit

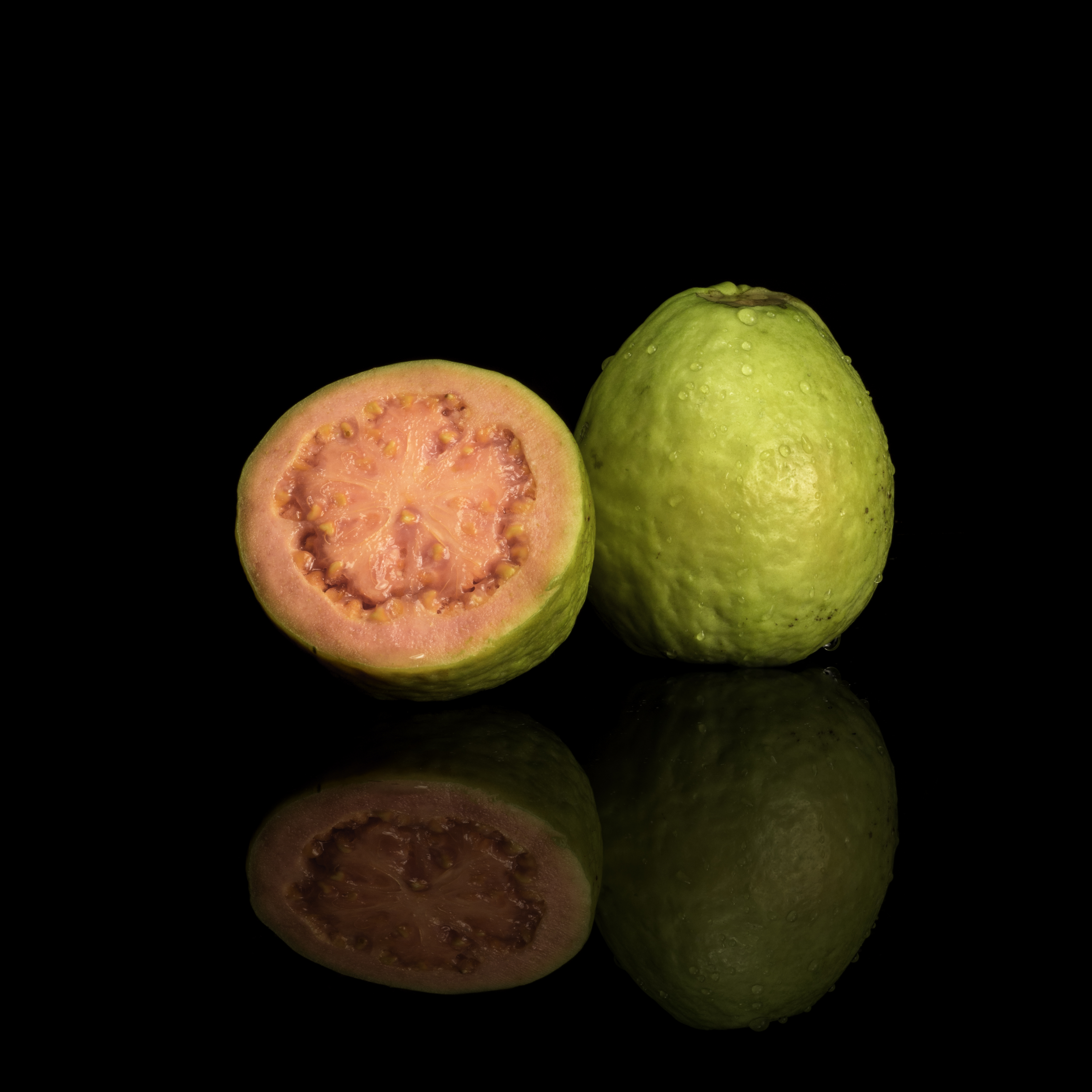
Red guava

=== Chemistry ===
The leaves of P. guajava contain the flavonol morin, morin-3-O-lyxoside, morin-3-O-arabinoside, quercetin and quercetin-3-O-arabinoside.

== Distribution and habitat ==
Guava is native to Peru, and has been introduced widely to tropical and subtropical regions of the Americas, Africa, and Asia. Some sources list it as also native to Mexico, Central America, the Caribbean, and the rest of South America.

It is a perennial tree that grows well under sun or warm temperatures. Therefore, it appears in numerous countries that have tropical or subtropical weather. Guava has a habitat contributing along roadside, grassland, or near sea level to 1,600 metres (5,200 ft) and it is more prevalent in humid grassland.

== Ecology ==
In some tropical locations, guavas can become invasive. It has become a major problem in the Galápagos Islands.

== Uses ==
Guava is an edible fruit, and can be eaten raw or cooked. The processing of the fruits yields by-products that can be fed to livestock. The leaves can also be used as fodder. It is also used by phasmid breeders to feed various stick insect species, including Extatosoma tiaratum and Eurycnema goliath, as well as various leaf insect species such as Pulchriphyllium giganteum, Pulchriphyllium bioculatum, and Phyllium monteithi.

Guava wood from Hawaii is commonly used for the smoking of meat. The wood is resistant to insect and fungal attack. The density of oven-dry wood is about 670 kg/m^{3} (1,130 lb/cu yd) and has been found suitable for roof trusses in Nigeria.

Psidium guajava has been used in traditional medicine by many cultures throughout Central America, the Caribbean, Africa, and Asia. It is used for inflammation, diabetes, hypertension, caries, wounds, pain relief, fever, diarrhea, rheumatism, lung diseases, and ulcers.

The plant is used in many different shampoo products for its scent. It is also becoming a popular bonsai species and is currently quite popular in India and Eastern Asia.
