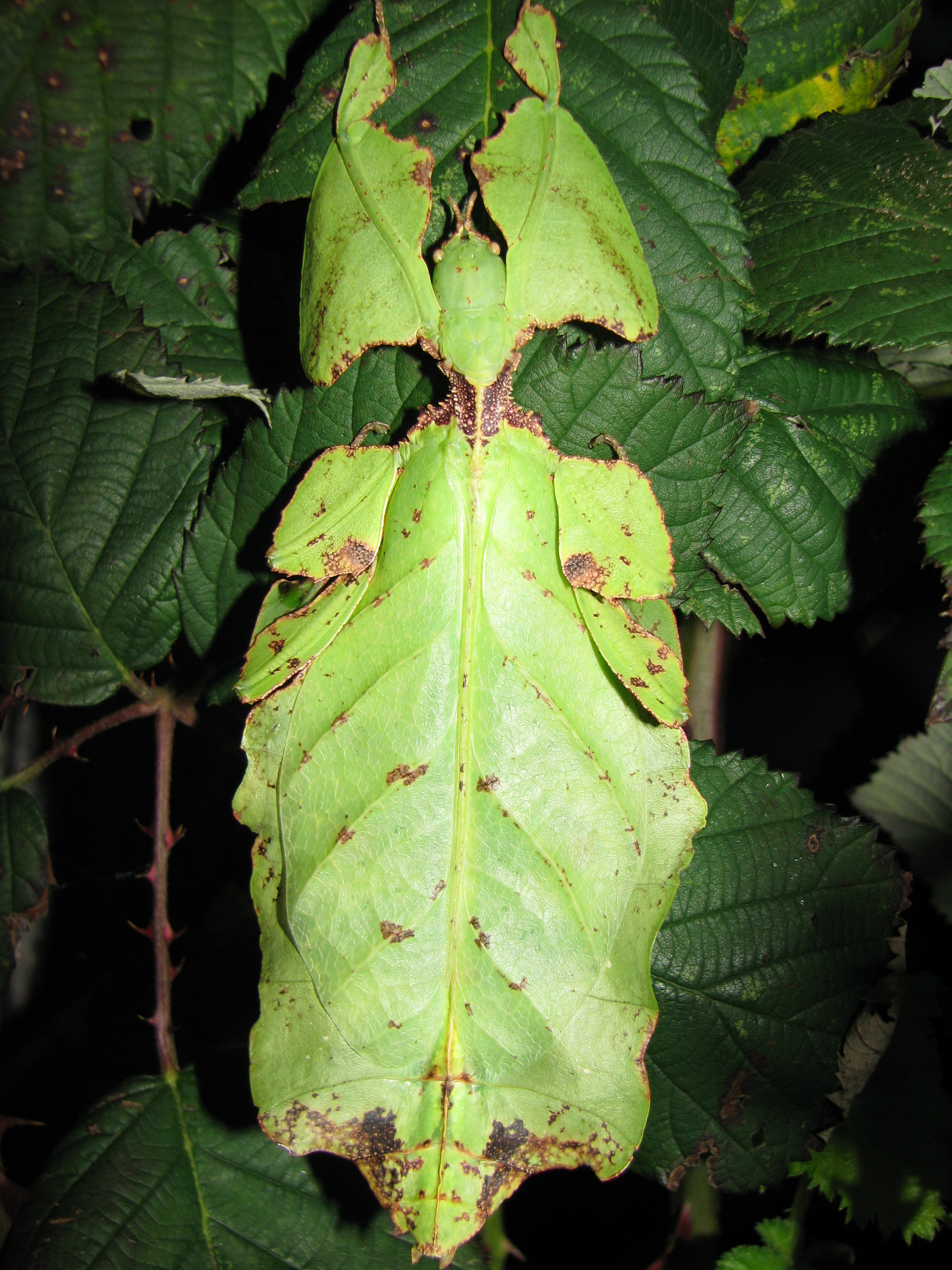
- Pulchriphyllium giganteum, adult female

Scientific classification
- Kingdom: Animalia
- Phylum: Arthropoda
- Clade: Pancrustacea
- Class: Insecta
- Order: Phasmatodea
- Family: Phylliidae
- Genus: Pulchriphyllium
- Species: P. giganteum

Binomial name
- Pulchriphyllium giganteum (Hausleithner, 1984)

Synonyms
- Phyllium giganteum

= Pulchriphyllium giganteum =

Species of leaf insect

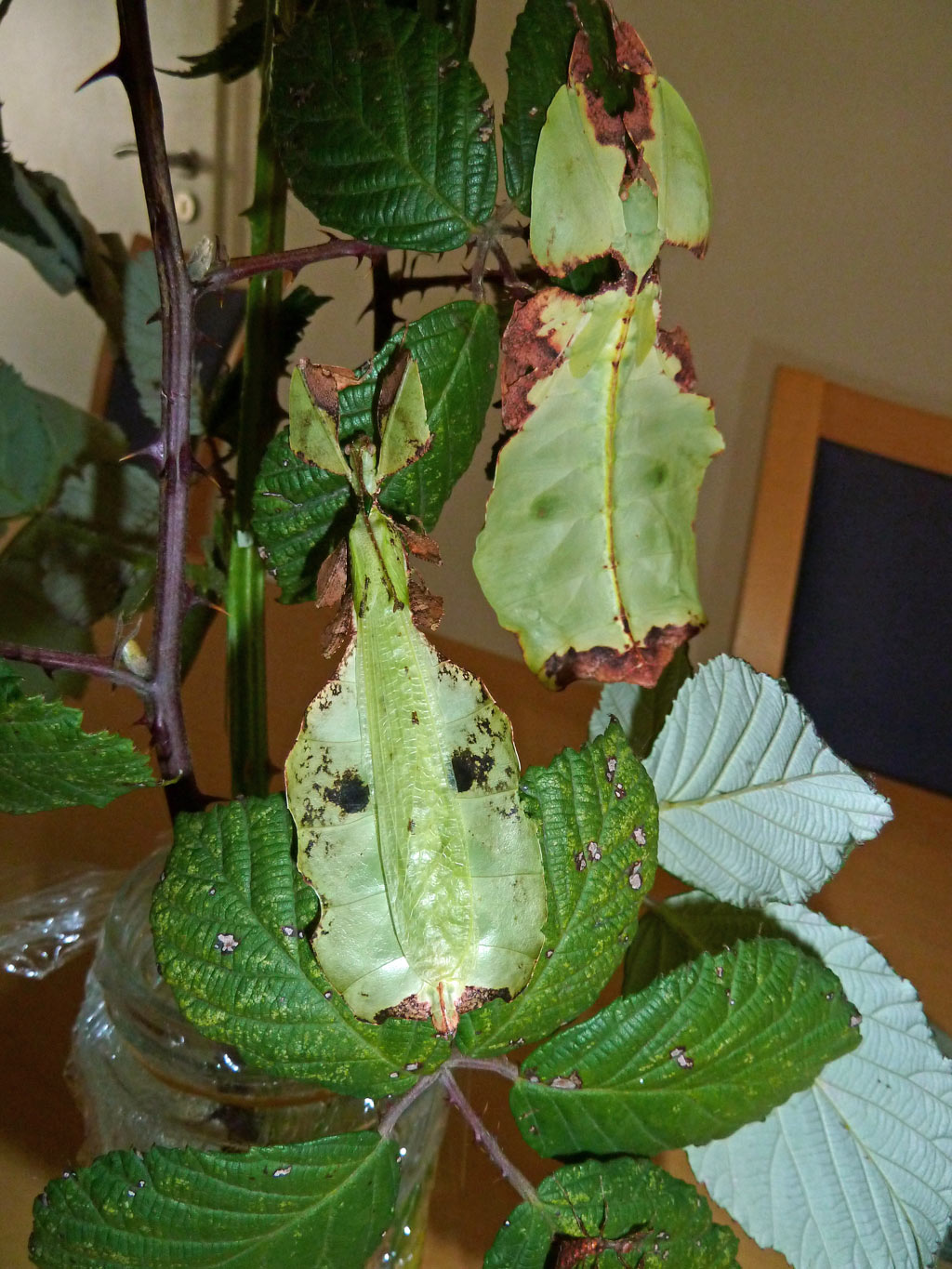
Adult male left, female nymph right

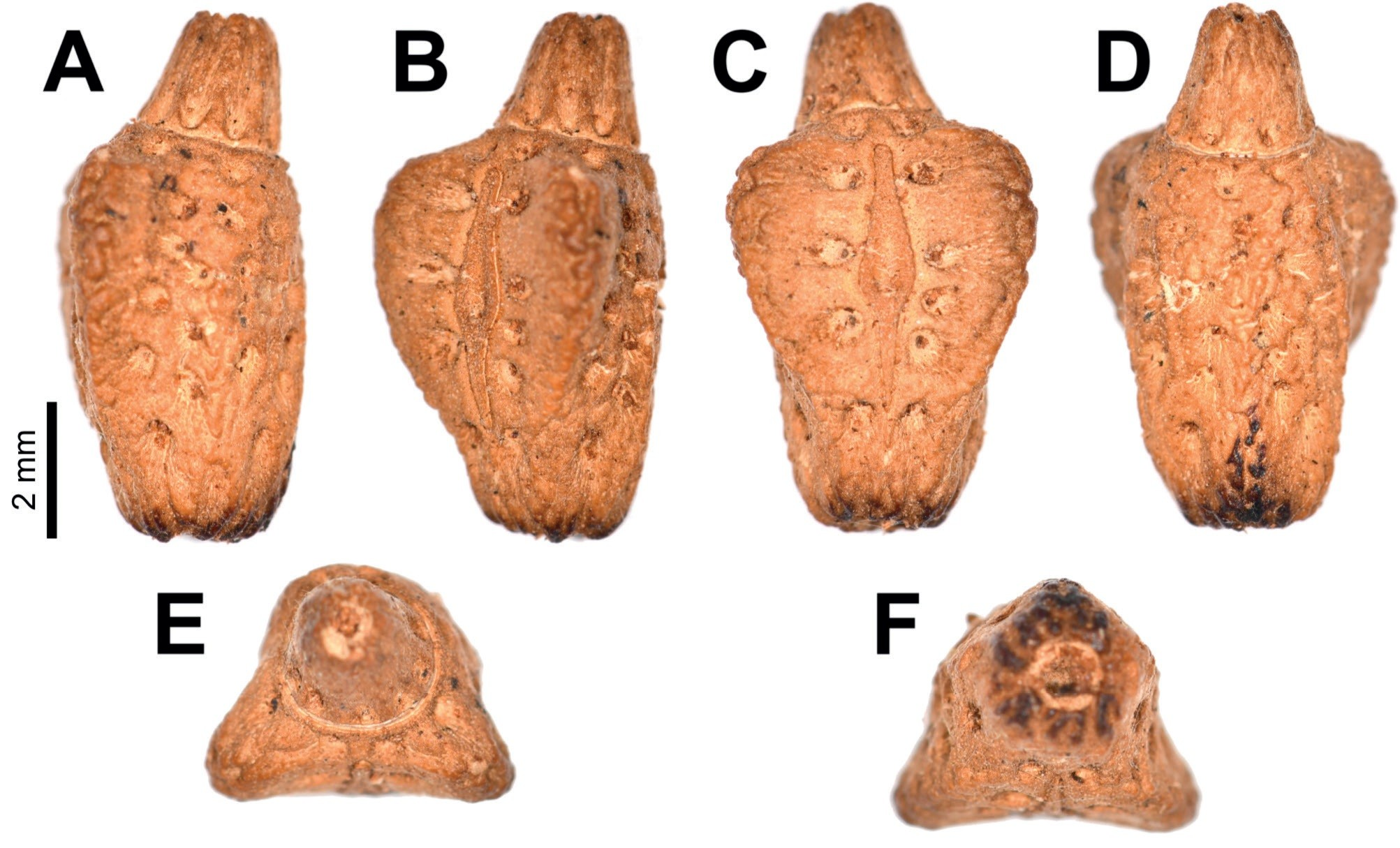
Egg in view from A lateral, B dorso-lateral, C dorsal, D ventral, E anterior (opercular), F posterior

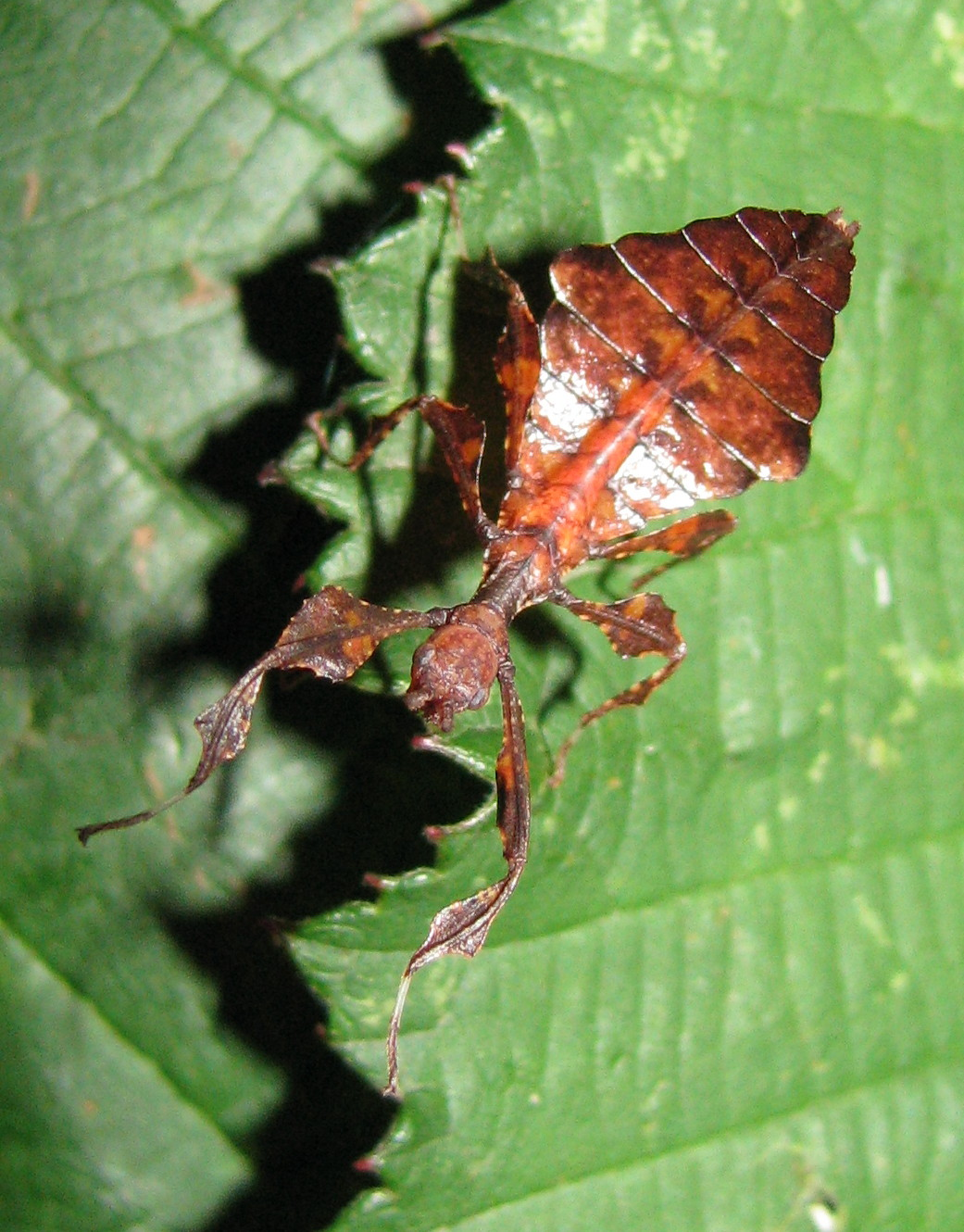
Freshly hatched nymph

Pulchriphyllium giganteum, commonly known as the Giant Malaysian leaf insect, is one of the largest species of leaf insects and was described from Malaysia in 1984. It is placed in the genus Pulchriphyllium since 2021.

== Description ==
Males reach a length of up to 8.2 centimetres (3.2 in), females almost 12.0 centimetres (4.7 in). This makes it the largest species belonging to the genus Pulchriphyllium one of the largest leaf insect species, alongside similarly sized species like Cryptophillium limogesi. Males have a relatively broad, slightly diamond-shaped abdomen. Their forewings, which function as tegmina, are short. The hindwings (alae) extend to the end of the abdomen. The end of the abdomen, the middle and hind legs, as well as the outer and inner lobes of the tibiae and the inner lobes of the forelegs' femurs, can be brown. The remaining body parts of newly emerged adult males are green with varying degrees of blackish-brown markings. After three to four weeks, they become increasingly yellow. Females lack hindwings. Their forewings are narrower and shorter than the abdomen and do not cover it to its lateral margins. They can be almost entirely green or have brown to blackish-brown markings on the body. The tibiae and parts of the mid and hind femurs, as well as the end of the abdomen, can also be brown. Yellow females can also occur. A pair of eyespots is present on the fifth abdominal segment in both sexes. In adult females, this is covered by the forewings. Their coloration and body shape perfectly mimic a partially withered leaf (leaf mimicry).

== Occurrence and habitat ==
Pulchriphyllium giganteum has the largest distribution area of all known species of the genus. Molecular genetic studies have confirmed its presence in the tropics of Malay Peninsula and Borneo. It is also reported to occur in Thailand and Sumatra. The captive-bred specimens originate from locations in northwestern Pahang, specifically the Cameron Highlands and the adjacent Tapah Hills in Perak, where they were found growing on shrubs. Pulchriphyllium giganteum found in the wild tend to be mostly females.

== Reproduction ==
Pulchriphyllium giganteum, according to observations in captivity, reproduces parthenogenetically. Males also rarely appear in purely parthenogenetic stocks. It is reported that one male is found among the offspring of every 20 to 500 females. A comparison of breeding stocks of purely parthenogenetic specimens with sexually reproducing specimens reveals "no noticeable change in the sex ratio of the nymphs". At its maximum, more than 10 % of the hatched nymphs were males.

The eggs are nearly black or brown and glossy and resemble seeds. They measuring 8.5 millimetres (0.33 in) in length, 4 millimetres (0.16 in) in width, and weighing an average of 34 mg, are the largest and heaviest of the leaf insects. After about six to eight months, they nymphs hatch. They are initially completely reddish-brown, but turn green once they begin feeding. Approximately four weeks after molting into adults, the females begin laying eggs. Up to seven eggs per week are simply dropped onto the ground. The nymphs hatch after about six to eight months. Their development can take seven to twelve months. The lifespan of an adult female is six to ten months. Males reach adulthood after only four molts and live for only a few weeks to a maximum of three months.

== Taxonomy ==
Representatives of Pulchriphyllium giganteum were first mentioned by Sakaguti in 1981, who assigned them to Phyllium pulchrifolium. In 1984, Burghard Hausleithner described the species under the name Phyllium giganteum. The chosen species name "giganteum" refers to the size of the species. The female holotype, as well as two other adult females and two juvenile females declared as paratypes, are kept in the collection of the Natural History Museum in Vienna. The holotype as well as the paratypes originates from the Cameron Highlands, probably from the Tapah Hills, less than 30 km away from the center of the Cameron Highlands. The Males of this species was described in 1994. In 2001 the species assigned to the subgenus Pulchriphyllium, thus giving it the full name Phyllium (Pulchriphyllium) giganteum. In 2009, Frank H. Hennemann et al. proposed dividing the genus Phyllium into species groups below the then-existing subgenera. Phyllium (Pulchriphyllium) giganteum is classified here in the bioculatum species group, which also includes Phyllium (Pulchriphyllium) sinense and Phyllium (Pulchriphyllium) pulchrifolium. Since 2021, the subgenus has been granted genus status, so the correct name since then has been Pulchriphyllium giganteum.

== In captivity ==
The species has been imported from several locations on the Malay Peninsula, including the Cameron Highlands and, in 2014, the Tapah Hills. It is listed by the Phasmid Study Group under PSG number 72.

In the terrarium, the temperature should be at least 22 °C (72 °F), between 25 and 33 °C (77 and 91 °F) during the day, and the humidity between 70 and 80 %. Psidium guajava (guava) leaves are the preferred food. Oak leaves can also be offered in summer and bramble leaves in winter, with the dried edges trimmed off, especially for smaller nymphs. Newly hatched nymphs are very delicate and die quickly if the climatic conditions are not precisely maintained. Direct spraying should be avoided.

== Gallery ==
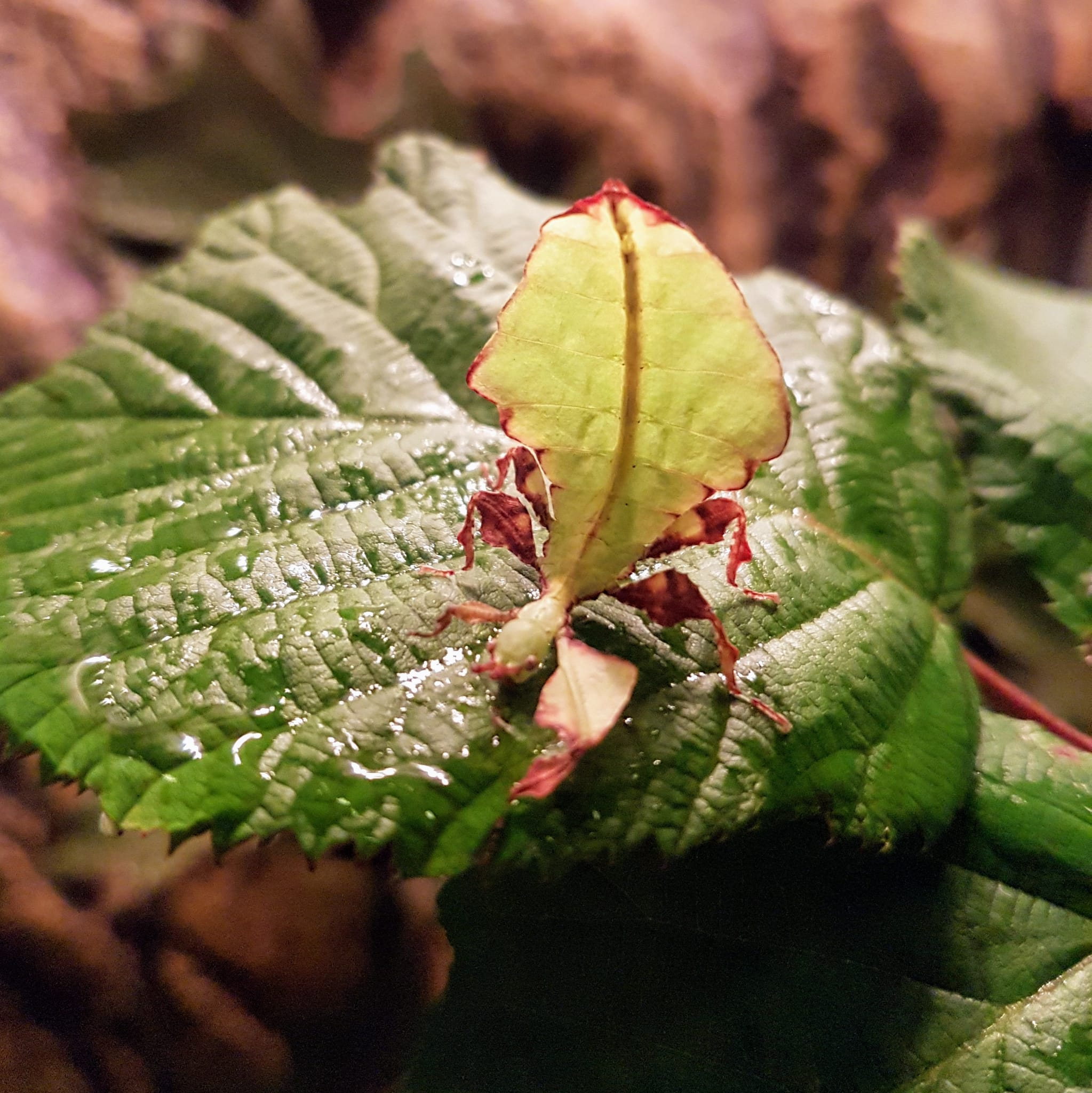
Female in L3 with regenerated right foreleg

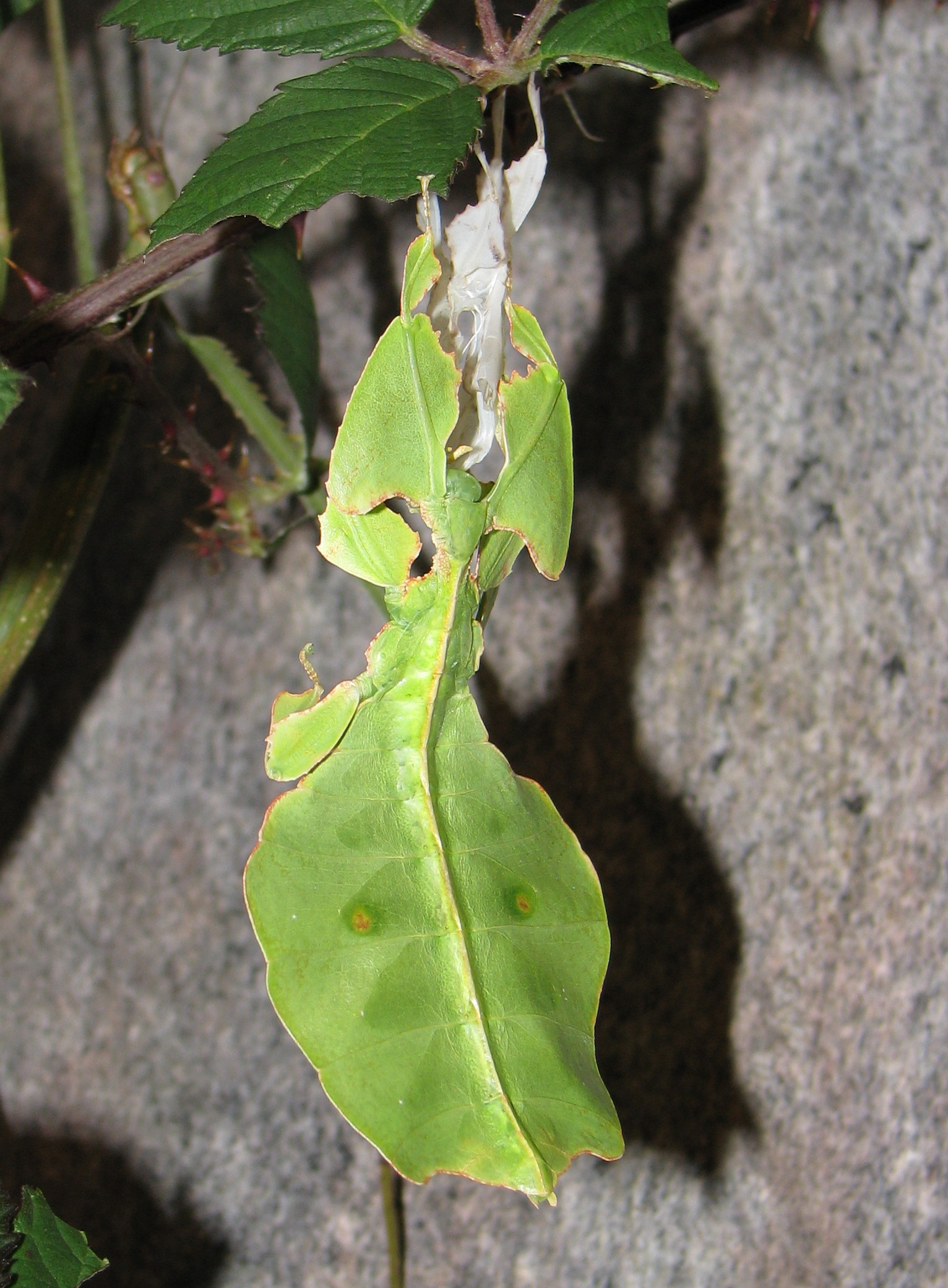
Female nymph at exuviae

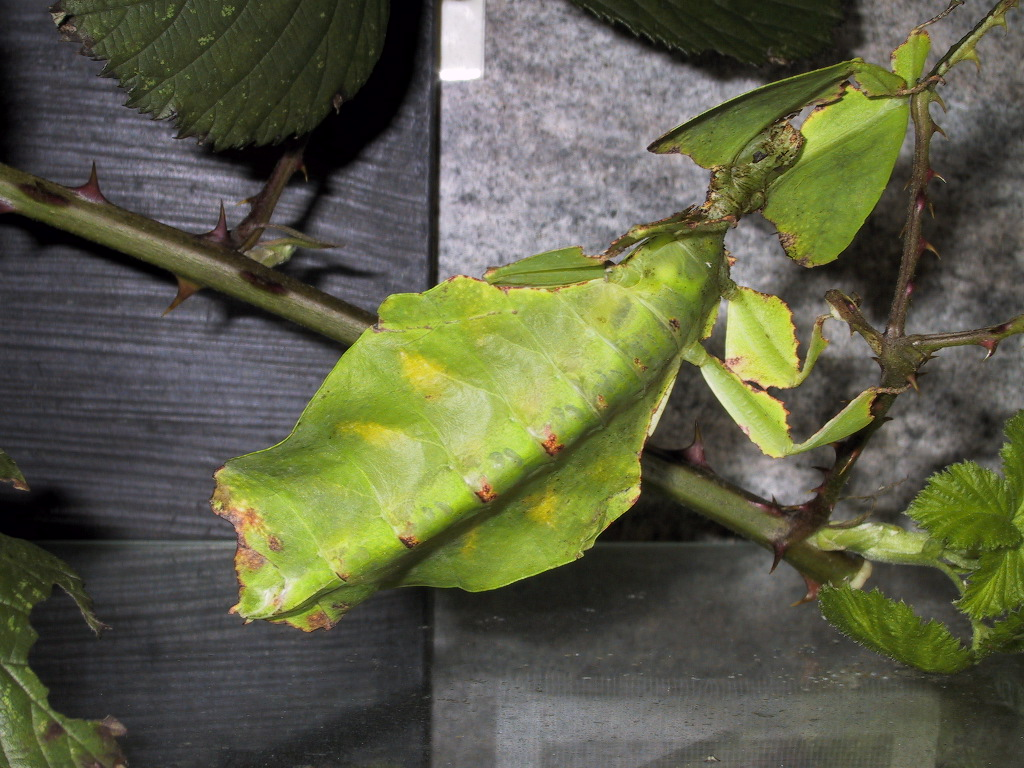
Subadult female from below

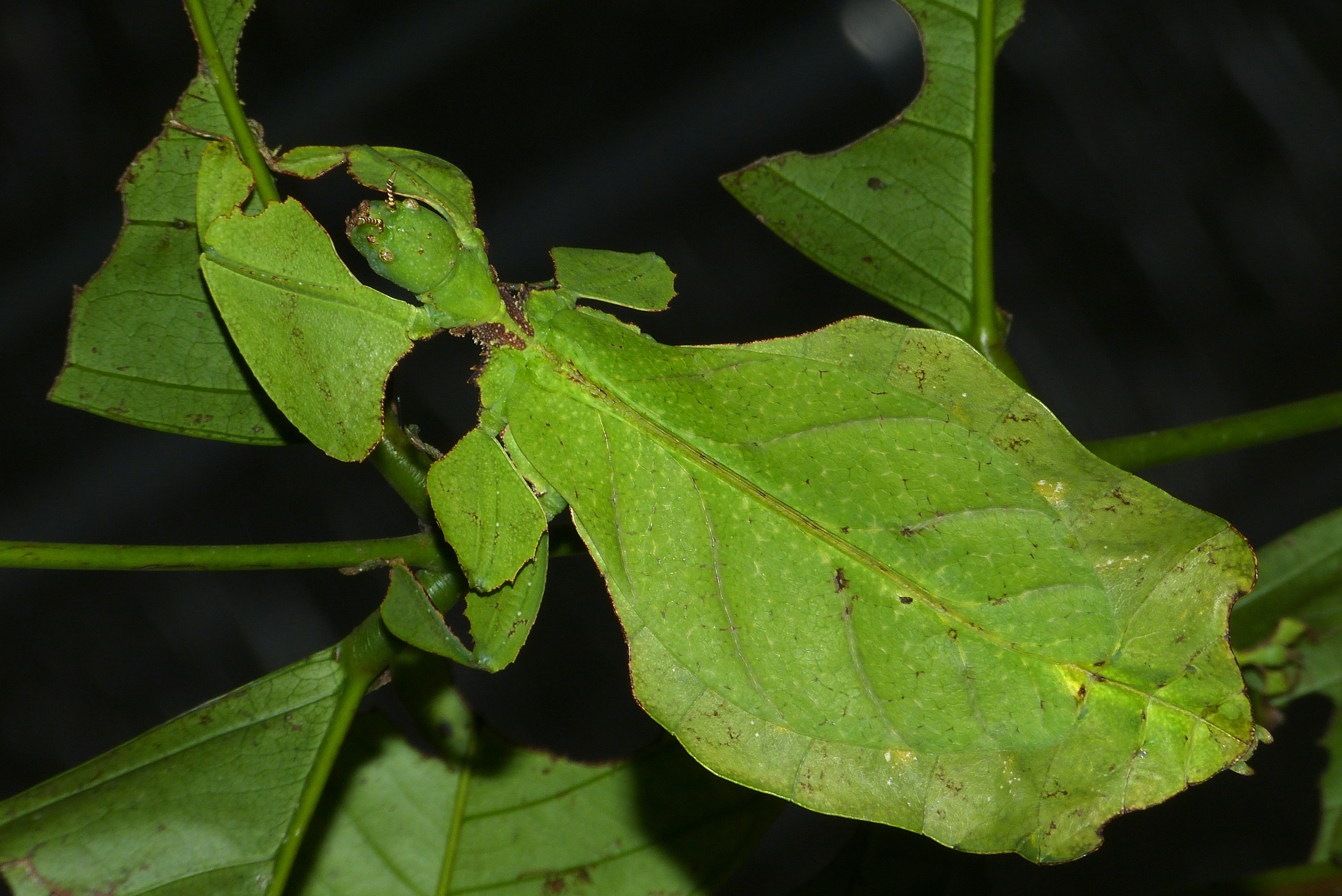
Green female
