= Moran (surname) =

Origin
- Meaning: "the big or great chieftain"
- Region of origin: Ireland

Other names
- Variant form: Ó Móráin

Moran (Irish: Ó Móráin) is a modern Irish surname derived from membership of a medieval dynastic sept. The name means a descendant of Mórán. “Mor” in Gaelic translates as big or great and “an” as the prefix the. Morans were a respected sept of the Uí Fiachrach dynasty in the western counties of Mayo and Sligo. In Ireland, where the name descended from the Gaelic, it is generally pronounced /ˈmɒrən/ anglicised approximate of the Irish pronunciation.

Elsewhere, pronunciation follows the French surname, Morant, anglicised to /məˈræn/ or /mɒˈræn/. There are many different crests of Moran, many bearing three stars and the motto Lucent in tenebris, Latin for "They shine in darkness". Another crest, attributed to the family of a Moran family living in Ballina, County Mayo, is described thus: "Azure on a mount proper, two lions combatant or, holding between them a flagstaff also proper, therefrom a flag argent; a crest: out of amural crown, a demi-saracen, head in profile, all proper; and a motto: 'Fides non timet.'" (This motto translates as "Faith does not fear" or "The faithful one fears not".)

The majority of bearers of this surname in County Mayo are descended from the Ó Móráin sept whose ancient kingdom was in north Mayo, surrounding the modern town of Ballina. Following the Norman invasion, their territory was usurped by the Barretts and Burkes and the sept lost its central organisation. The modern distribution of the surname within Mayo suggests that the Morans spread southwards and today are chiefly found in the central area of the county, particularly in the barony of Carra.

The majority of bearers of this surname in County Leitrim are descended from the Ó Móráin sept of the Muintir Eolais, and more specifically the Conmhaicne of Maigh Nissi, who lived along the River Shannon.

== People named Moran ==
=== A–F ===
- Alice Moran, Canadian actress
- Bernard N. Moran, American politician
- Bill Moran (disambiguation), several people
- Brian Moran (disambiguation), several people
- Bugs Moran (1891–1957), Chicago Prohibition-era gangster
- Caitlin Moran (born 1975), British writer and journalist
- Catherine Moran, US–New Zealand professor
- Charles Moran (baseball) (1879–1934), American baseball player
- Charley Moran (1878–1949), American baseball player and football coach
- Chris Moran (1956–2010), Royal Air Force officer
- Chris Moran (born 1959), British orthopaedic surgeon
- Christopher Moran (born 1948), Anglo-Irish businessman
- Clarence Gabriel Moran (died 1953), British barrister and writer
- Colin Moran (born 1992), American baseball player
- Crissy Moran (born 1975), American former pornographic actress and model
- Daniel Keys Moran (born 1962), American computer programmer and science fiction writer
- Daniel Thomas Moran (born 1957), American poet
- David Moran (disambiguation), several people
- Denis Moran (Gaelic footballer) (born 1956), Irish Gaelic football player
- Dennis Moran (computer criminal) (1982–2013), American computer hacker
- Dennis Moran (rugby league) (born 1977), British rugby league
- Diana Moran (born 1939), British model, fitness expert and journalist
- Dolores Moran (1926–1982), American film actress and model
- Dov Moran (born c.1956), Israeli engineer, inventor and businessman
- Dylan Moran (born 1971), Irish comedian, writer, actor and film-maker
- Earl Moran (1893–1984), American pin-up and glamour artist
- Edward Moran (disambiguation), several people
- Ella Payne Moran (1898–1985), American educator
- Ellen Moran (born 1967), American politician
- Emilio Moran, American anthropologist
- Erin Moran (1960–2017), American actress
- Frances Moran (1893–1977), Irish barrister and legal scholar
- Frank Moran (1887–1967), American boxer and film actor

=== G–N ===
- Gayle Moran (fl. 1970s), British musician
- Graeme Moran (1938–1996), New Zealand Rower
- Gussie Moran (1923–2013), American tennis player
- Hap Moran (1901–1994), American professional football player
- Herbert Moran (1885–1945), Australian rugby union player
- Ian Moran (born 1972), American professional ice hockey player
- Ian Moran (born 1979), Australian cricketer
- Jack Moran (disambiguation), several people
- Jackie Moran (1923–1990), American movie actor
- James Moran (disambiguation), several people
- Jason Moran (1967–2003), Australian criminal
- Jason Moran (musician) (born 1975), American jazz pianist
- Jeannie Blackburn Moran (1841–1929), American author, editor, civic leader
- Jeff Moran (born 1959) American Southern Gospel songwriter & Baptist minister
- Jerry Moran (born 1954), United States Senator from Kansas
- Jim Moran (disambiguation), several people
- Joe Moran (disambiguation), several people
- John Moran (disambiguation), several people
- Joseph P. Moran (1895–1934), American medical doctor linked to the Chicago underworld
- Judy Moran (born 1944), matriarch of Australian criminal family
- Julie Moran (born 1962), American television personality
- Ken Moran (1925–2009), Australian Paralympic lawn bowler
- Kenneth Moran (c. 1919–1946), New Zealand boxer
- Kevin Moran (disambiguation), several people
- Layla Moran (born 1982), British politician
- Lewis Moran (1941–2004), Australian criminal
- Lindsay Moran (born 1969), American former Central Intelligence Agency officer, now a writer
- Lois Moran (1909–1990), American actress
- Malcolm Moran, American sports writer
- Margaret Moran (born 1955), British politician
- Margie Moran (born 1953), Filipino former Miss Universe, peace advocate
- Mark Moran (disambiguation), several people
- Martin Moran (actor) (born 1959), American actor
- Martin Moran (climber) (1955–2019), British mountaineer
- Martin Moran (footballer) (fl. 1900s), Scottish footballer
- Matt Moran (born 1969), Australian chef
- Mayo Moran (born 1959), dean of the Faculty of Law of the University of Toronto
- Melbourne Moran, American politician
- Michael Moran (disambiguation), several people
- Michelle Moran (born 1980), American novelist
- Mike Moran (music producer) (born 1948), English keyboard musician and producer
- Nancy Moran, American singer and songwriter
- Nancy A. Moran, American biologist
- Nick Moran (born 1968), British actor

=== O–Z ===
- Paddy Moran (disambiguation), several people
- Pat Moran (disambiguation), several people
- Patrick Moran (disambiguation), several people
- Paul Moran (disambiguation), several people
- Pauline Moran (born 1947), English actress
- Peggy Moran (1918–2002), American film actress
- Percy Moran (1862–1935), American artist
- Peter K. Moran (1767–1831), Irish composer and pianist
- Polly Moran (1883–1952), American actress and comedian
- Priscilla Moran (1918–2006), American silent film actress
- Rachel Moran (born 1956), American lawyer
- Regina Moran, Irish Engineer
- Reid Venable Moran (1916–2010), American botanist and museum curator
- Richard Moran (disambiguation), several people
- Robert Moran (disambiguation), several people
- Rocky Moran (born 1950), American race car driver
- Roger Moran, British hillclimb driver
- Ronnie Moran (1934–2017), British football coach
- Rosalyn Moran, British neuroscientist
- Sam Moran (born 1978), Australian entertainer
- Sean Moran (born 1973), American football player
- Shane Moran (born 1960), Australian businessman
- Shawn Moran (born 1961), American speedway rider
- Simon Moran, British concert promoter
- Shlomo Moran (born 1947), Israeli computer scientist
- Steve Moran (born 1961), English football player
- Terry Moran (born 1959), American journalist
- Terry Moran (public servant) (born 1947), senior official in the Australian Public Service
- Thomas Moran (disambiguation), several people
- Tom Moran (disambiguation), several people
- Tony Moran (DJ), American remixer, producer and singer-songwriter
- Tony Moran (actor) (born 1957), American actor and producer
- Trevi Moran, American recording artist, singer and YouTube personality
- Vic Moran, Scottish curler
- William Joseph Moran (1906–1996), American Roman Catholic bishop
- William L. Moran (1921–2000), American Assyriologist

== Fictional characters ==
- Alex Moran, principal character in the Spike TV series Blue Mountain State
- Blake Moran, main character of the TV series Madam Secretary
- Gia Moran, the Yellow Ranger in Power Rangers Megaforce and Power Rangers Super Megaforce
- Jacques Moran, second narrator and seeker of the eponymous Molloy in the novel by Samuel Beckett
- Jacques Moran, son of Jacques Moran, second narrator of Molloy; as Moran père writes, "His name is Jacques, like mine. This cannot lead to confusion."
- Lucy Moran, character in Twin Peaks
- Michael Moran, the central character in John McGahern's novel Amongst Women
- Micky Moran, the human alter ego of the superhero Marvelman.
- Moran, a female Irish Quidditch player in Harry Potter and the Goblet of Fire
- Pamela Moran, a main character from the TV series Army Wives
- Sebastian Moran, Moriarty's henchman in the Sherlock Holmes short story "The Adventure of the Empty House"
- Summer Moran, a recurring character in Clive Cussler's novels featuring Dirk Pitt
- Simon Moran, a main character in "The Returned" series

== See also ==
- Moeran
- Moran family
- Morán, a Spanish surname
- Morant, surname
- Morin (disambiguation)
- Muintir Eolais
- Morand (surname)
- Morland (surname)
- Moland (disambiguation)
