= Morant =

Morant is a surname. Notable people with the surname include:

- Angela Morant (b. 1941), English actress
- Blake Morant, Dean of George Washington University School of Law
- Breaker Morant, (1864–1902), Australian drover, horseman, bush poet and military officer
- Clarice Morant (1904–2009), American caregiver
- Edward Morant (cricketer, born 1772) (1772–1855), English amateur cricketer
- George Soulié de Morant (1878-1955), French scholar and diplomat
- Henry Charles Frank Morant (1885-1952), Australian writer and photographer
- Ja Morant (b. 1999), American basketball player
- Johan Morant (b. 1986), French ice hockey defenceman
- Johnnie Morant (b. 1981), American gridiron football player
- Pablo Morant (b. 1970), Argentine footballer
- Philip Morant, (1700–1770), English clergyman, author and historian
- Richard Morant (1945–2011), English actor
- Robert Laurie Morant (1863–1920), English administrator and educationalist

== See also ==
- Moran (given name)
- Moran (surname)
- Sevenia morantii
