= Sevenia dubiosa =

Scientific classification
- Kingdom: Animalia
- Phylum: Arthropoda
- Class: Insecta
- Order: Lepidoptera
- Family: Nymphalidae
- Genus: Sevenia
- Species: S. dubiosa

Binomial name
- Sevenia dubiosa (Strand, 1911)

Synonyms
- Asterope dubiosa Strand, 1911; Sallya dubiosa; Sallya dubiosa morantii (Strand, 1911)

Species of butterfly

Sevenia dubiosa is a butterfly in the family Nymphalidae. It is found in western Tanzania, the eastern part of the Democratic Republic of the Congo and northern Zambia.

== Description in Seitz ==
C. dubiosa Strand is unknown to me and is described as follows: “Above about as Sevenia boisduvali Wallengr., dark brown with slight olivaceous gloss, occasionally perhaps almost pure black; fringes with very slight pale greyish gloss, on the forewing with traces of whitish spots; this wing is a little darker in the cell and the costal area than posteriorly; beneath it is ochre-yellow with grey-brownish margin and a large black spot between the cell and the apex, as well as a smaller spot in the cell itself at the discocellular; the distal and larger of these spots is 4mm. in length, fully as broad, and connected posteriorly with the discocellular spot; towards the costal margin in particular fine blackish subterminal spots or streaks are present. The apex of the fore¬ wing beneath and on the underside of the hindwing the basal half and the eye-spots violet, the latter narrowly bordered with greyish and with darker pupils; the posterior half grey-brownish, slightly olivaceous and with a violet-tinged marginal band about 2mm. in breadth; the eye-spot in cellule 4 is only half as large as the others and bears no black pupil, the one in cellule 7 is also somewhat smaller than the rest, but otherwise like them; in the basal area are placed in a transverse row 3 black lines, basally convex, lighter-markedproximally. The species is no doubt nearly allied to morantii Trim, and possibly only a variety of it”. German East Africa

The habitat consists of forests and woodland.

Adults are attracted to bananas.
