= Christopher Moran =

Christopher Moran, or Chris Moran, may refer to:

- Chris Moran (RAF officer) (1956-2010), Air Chief Marshal of the British Royal Air Force
- Chris Moran (surgeon) (b.1959), orthopeadic surgeon and professor at Nottingham University Hospital, UK
- Christopher Moran (businessman) (b.1948), President of Co-operation Ireland and owner of Crosby Moran Hall in Chelsea, London, UK
