= James Moran =

James Moran may refer to:

== Politics and law ==
- James Moran (diplomat) (fl. 2012–2016), British diplomat; ambassador of the European Union to Egypt
- James Moran (Irish politician) (died 1938), Irish politician
- James Byron Moran (1930–2009), U.S. federal judge
- James G. Moran (1870–1941), American politician in Massachusetts
- Jim Moran (born 1945), U.S. congressman from Virginia

== Sports ==
- James Moran Sr. (1912–1983), American football guard
- James Moran (American football) (1921–2005), American football coach at King's College
- Jim Moran (basketball) (born 1978), American professional basketball player
- Jim Moran (boxer) (1963–2021), British boxer
- Jim Moran (skier) (born 1972), American Olympic skier

== Others ==
- James Moran (shipbuilder) (fl. 1805–1856), Canadian shipbuilder
- James Moran (writer) (born 1972), British screenwriter
- James Michael Moran (born 1943), American radio astronomer
- Jim Moran (businessman) (1918–2007), American auto dealer and philanthropist
- Jim Moran (publicist) (1908–1999), American publicist and press agent

== See also ==
- Jimmy Moran (disambiguation)
