= Floran Douay =

French ice hockey player (born 1995)

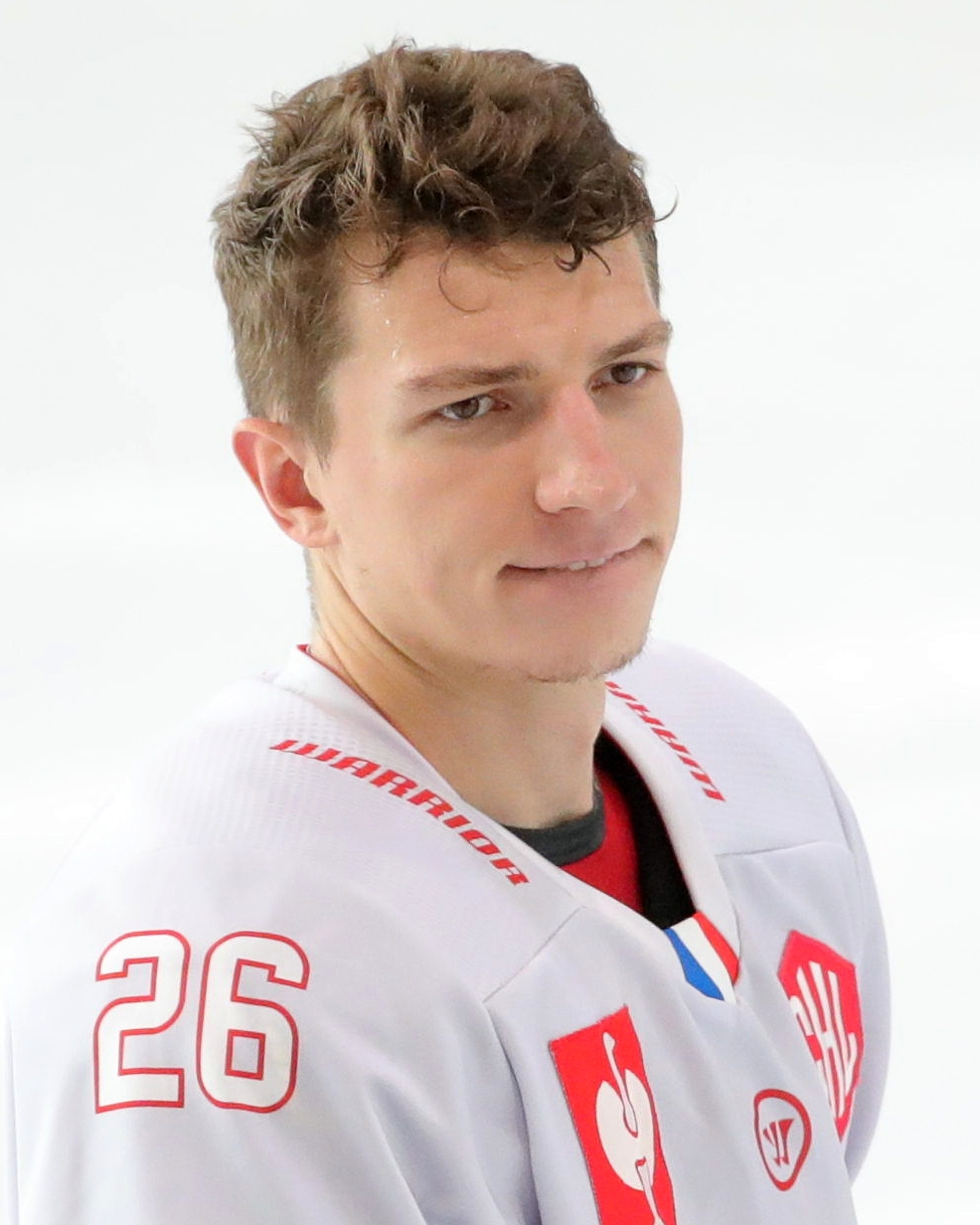
- Born: 7 February 1995 (age 31) Sallanches, France
- Height: 6 ft 3 in (191 cm)
- Weight: 209 lb (95 kg; 14 st 13 lb)
- Position: Left wing
- Shoots: Left
- NL team Former teams: Lausanne HC; Genève-Servette HC; SCL Tigers; HC Ambrì-Piotta
- National team: France
- Playing career: 2013–present

Floran Douay (born 7 February 1995) is a French professional ice hockey player who is a left winger for Lausanne HC of the National League (NL). Douay also plays for the French national team.

Douay played all of his junior hockey in Switzerland, which allows him to compete in the National League with a Swiss player license.

== Playing career ==
Douay made his National League debut with Genève-Servette HC during the 2013-14 season, playing 2 games with the team. He only became a regular for Geneva in the 2015–16 season, playing all 50 regular season games and scoring 11 points. Douay was also loaned to multiple teams in the Swiss League (SL) to help him develop his game.

On 8 May 2018, Douay signed a two-year contract extension with Geneva through the 2019–20 season. On 21 December 2018, Douay was badly hit by fellow Frenchman Johann Morant in a game against EV Zug and was immediately taken out of the game. He underwent an MRI the next day to reveal ACL and meniscus tear. Douay had to undergo surgery, which ended his season.

On 30 August 2019, Douay was signed to an early three-year contract extension by Geneva through the 2022–23 season. Douay was loaned to HC Ambrì-Piotta along with Geneva's teammate, Marco Miranda, for the 2019 Spengler Cup. He played all 3 games and put up 2 assists as Ambri-Piotta fell in OT to Ocelari Trinec in the semi-finals.

On 23 August 2020 Douay was traded -along with Guillaume Maillard- to Lausanne HC in exchange for Tyler Moy.

Douay began the 2022–23 season on loan with HC Sierre of the SL before Lausanne HC decided to terminate his contract on 10 October 2022. That same day, he was signed to a one-year deal with the SCL Tigers for the remainder of the 2022–23 season.

== International play ==
He participated at the 2017 IIHF World Championship and the 2018 IIHF World Championship, representing Team France. Douay also scored against Canada in the 2026 France versus Canada Olympic hockey game on Sun February 15.
