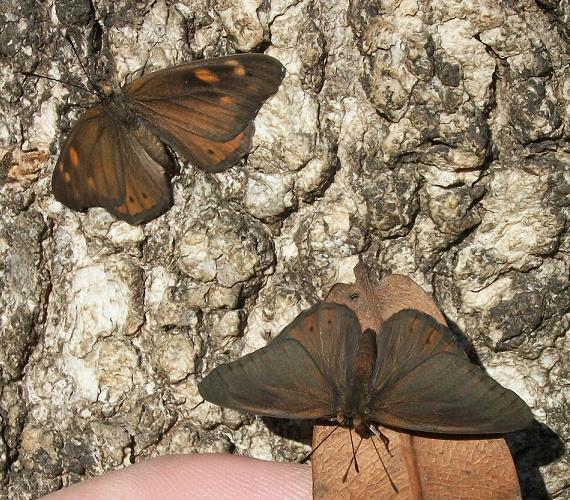
- Boisduval's tree nymph, female on left and male on right

Scientific classification
- Domain: Eukaryota
- Kingdom: Animalia
- Phylum: Arthropoda
- Class: Insecta
- Order: Lepidoptera
- Family: Nymphalidae
- Tribe: Epicaliini
- Genus: Sevenia; Koçak, 1996

Synonyms
- Crenis Boisduval, 1833 (non Hübner, 1821: preoccupied); Sallya Hemming, 1964 (non Yochelson, 1956: preoccupied); Asterope (auctt., nec Hübner, [1819])

= Sevenia =

Genus of brush-footed butterflies

Sevenia, commonly called tree nymphs, is a genus of forest butterflies in the family Nymphalidae that, as larvae, feed on plants of the family Euphorbiaceae. There are fourteen species from continental Africa and two (or three) species from Madagascar. See Idea for the genus of Southeast Asian tree nymphs.

== Taxonomy ==
Sevenia (as Sallya) has been viewed as a subgenus of the Neotropical genus Eunica by authors. The type species of the genus is Crenis madagascariensis Boisduval

== Species and subspecies ==
Listed alphabetically:

- Sevenia amazoula (Mabille, 1880)
- Sevenia amulia (Cramer, 1777)
  - Sevenia amulia amulia (Cramer, 1777) (= Papilio amulia Cramer, 1777)
  - Sevenia amulia rosa (Hewitson, 1877)
  - Sevenia amulia intermedia Carcasson, 1961
- Sevenia benguelae (Chapman, 1872)
- Sevenia boisduvali (Wallengren, 1857) (= Crenis boisduvali Wallengren, 1857) – Boisduval's tree nymph
  - Sevenia boisduvali boisduvali (Wallengren, 1857)
  - Sevenia boisduvali omissa (Rothschild, 1918)
  - Sevenia boisduvali kaffana (Rothschild & Jordan)
  - Sevenia boisduvali insularis (Joicey & Talbot)
- Sevenia consors (Rothschild & Jordan, 1903)
- Sevenia dubiosa (Strand, 1911)
- Sevenia garega (Karsch, 1892)
  - Sevenia garega garega (Karsch, 1892)
  - Sevenia garega ansorgei (Rothschild & Jordan, 1903)
- Sevenia howensis (Staudinger, 1886)
- Sevenia madagascariensis (Boisduval, 1833) (= Crenis madagascariensis Boisduval, 1833)
- Sevenia morantii (Trimen, 1881) (= Crenis morantii Trimen, 1881) – Morant's tree nymph
  - Sevenia morantii morantii (Trimen, 1881)
  - Sevenia morantii dubiosa (Strand)
- Sevenia natalensis (Boisduval, 1847) (= Crenis natalensis Boisduval, 1847) – Natal tree nymph
- Sevenia occidentalium (Mabille, 1876)
  - Sevenia occidentalium occidentalium (Mabille, 1876)
  - Sevenia occidentalium penricei (Rothschild & Jordan)
- Sevenia pechueli (Dewitz, 1879)
  - Sevenia pechueli pechueli (Dewitz, 1879)
  - Sevenia pechueli rhodesiana (Rothschild)
- Sevenia pseudotrimeni Kielland, 1985
- Sevenia rosa (Hewitson, 1877) – Rosa's tree nymph
- Sevenia silvicola (Schultze, 1917)
- Sevenia trimeni (Aurivillius, 1899) (= Crenis natalensis var. trimeni Aurivillius, 1899) – Trimen's tree nymph
  - Sevenia trimeni trimeni (Aurivillius, 1899)
  - Sevenia trimeni major (Rothschild)
- Sevenia umbrina (Karsch, 1892)
