= Sevenia pseudotrimeni =

Scientific classification
- Kingdom: Animalia
- Phylum: Arthropoda
- Class: Insecta
- Order: Lepidoptera
- Family: Nymphalidae
- Genus: Sevenia
- Species: S. pseudotrimeni

Binomial name
- Sevenia pseudotrimeni (Kielland, 1985)

Synonyms
- Sallya pseudotrimeni Kielland, 1985

Species of butterfly

Sevenia pseudotrimeni is a butterfly in the family Nymphalidae. It is found in eastern Tanzania. The habitat consists of forests at altitudes ranging from near sea level to about 1,900 meters.

Adults are attracted to bananas and males have been recorded settling on paths and forest roads to suck moisture.
