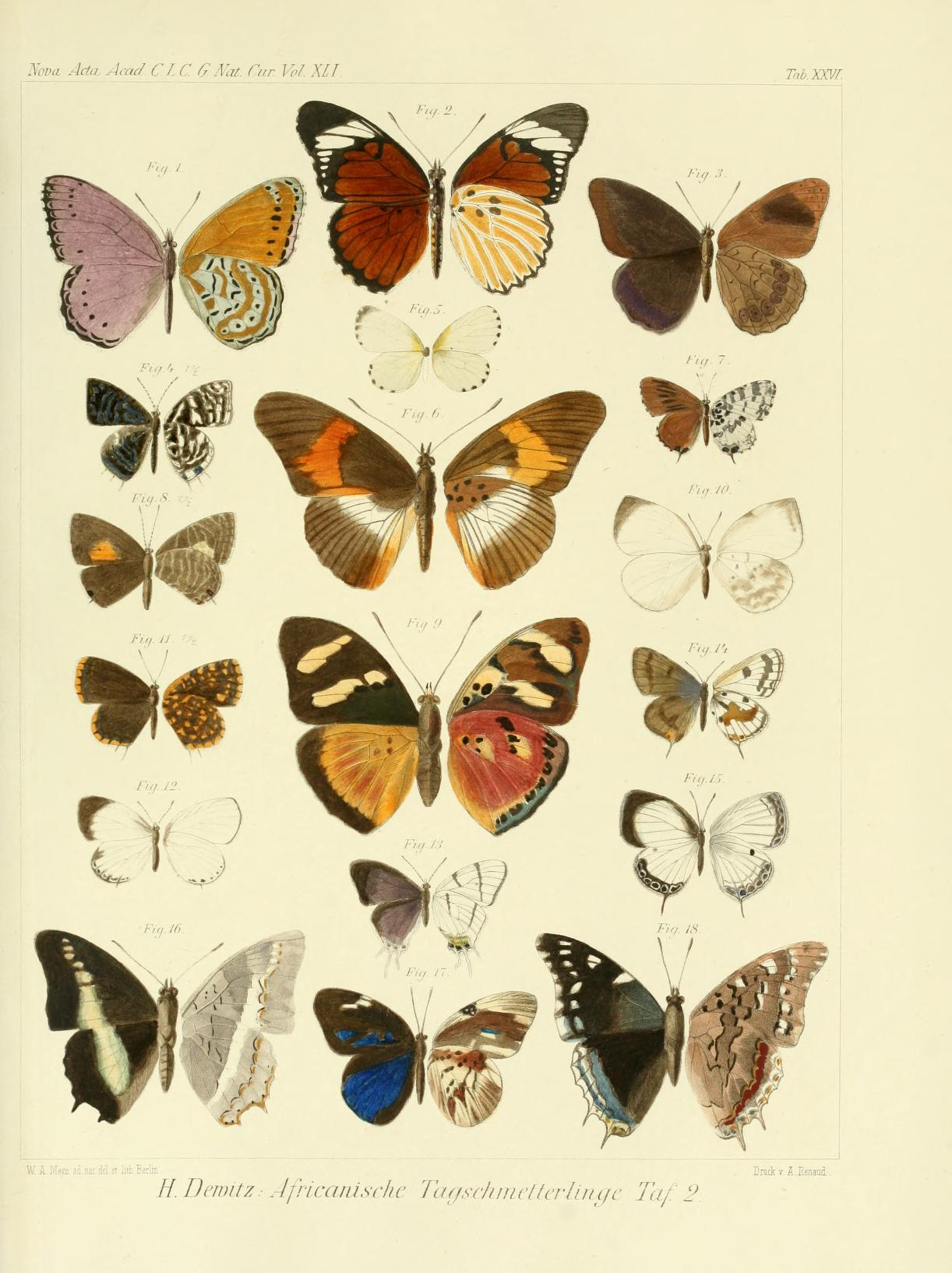
- Figure 1, accompanying original description

Scientific classification
- Kingdom: Animalia
- Phylum: Arthropoda
- Class: Insecta
- Order: Lepidoptera
- Family: Nymphalidae
- Genus: Sevenia
- Species: S. pechueli

Binomial name
- Sevenia pechueli (Dewitz, 1879)

Synonyms
- Crenis pechueli Dewitz, 1879; Sallya pechueli; Crenis pechueli var. albicans Gaede, 1916; Crenis pechueli rhodesiana Rothschild, 1918; Sallya pechueli sangbae Hecq & Peeters, 1992

= Sevenia pechueli =

Species of butterfly

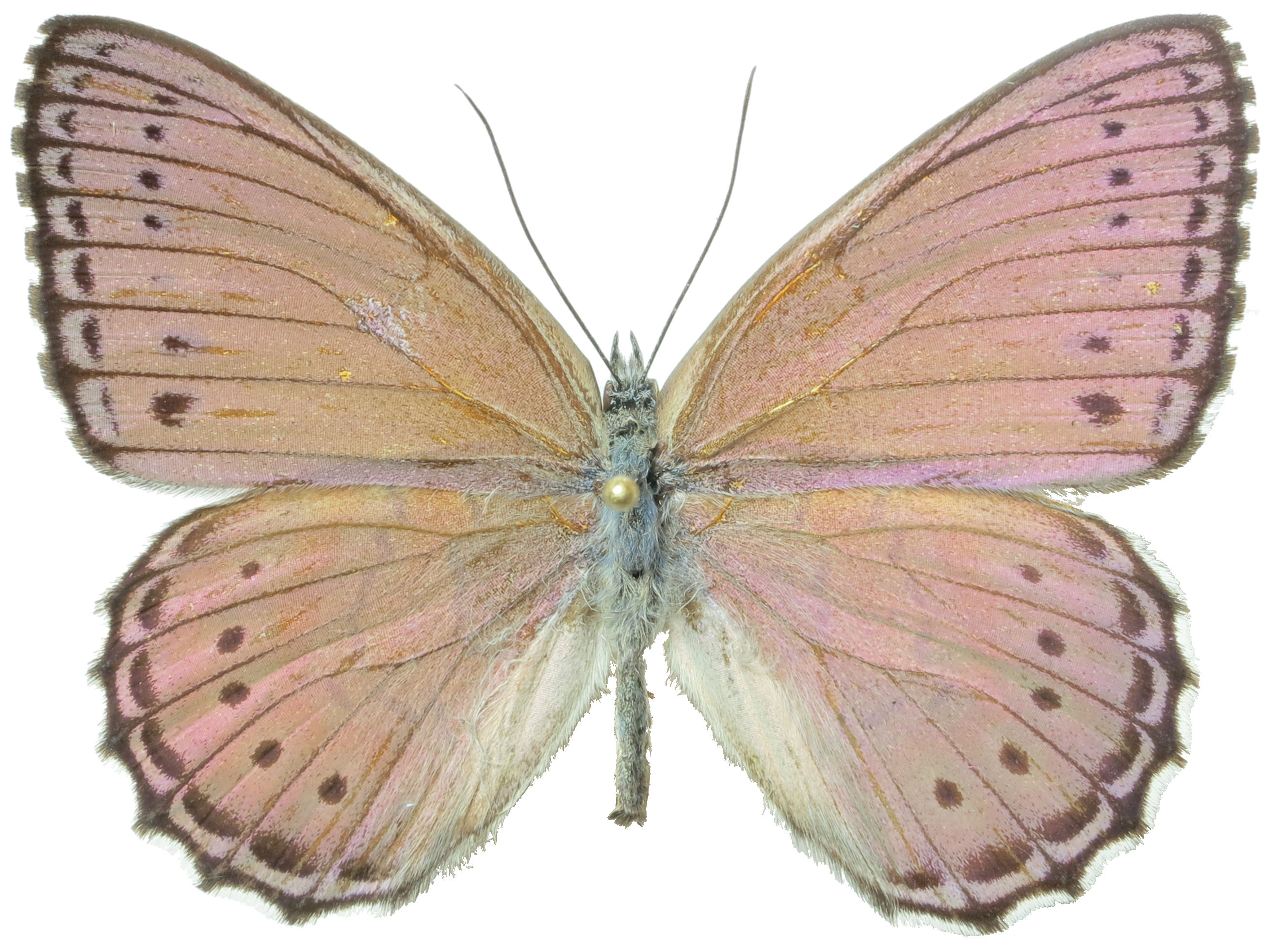
Sevenia pechueli from CAR

Sevenia pechueli, the spotted lilac tree nymph, is a butterfly in the family Nymphalidae. The butterfly is found in Nigeria, Cameroon, the Republic of the Congo, Angola, the Democratic Republic of the Congo, the Central African Republic, Tanzania, Malawi, Zambia, and Namibia. The habitat consists of woodland, especially in marshy areas.

Adults are attracted to fermenting fruit, sucking trees, and excrement.

The larvae feed on Maprouna africana, Sapium ellipticum, and Hymenocardia species.

== Subspecies ==
- Sevenia pechueli pechueli (southern and western Democratic Republic of the Congo, Angola, Namibia)
- Sevenia pechueli rhodesiana (Rothschild, 1918) (western and southern Tanzania, Malawi, northern Zambia)
- Sevenia pechueli sangbae (Hecq & Peeters, 1992) (northern Nigeria, northern Cameroon, Congo, Central African Republic)
