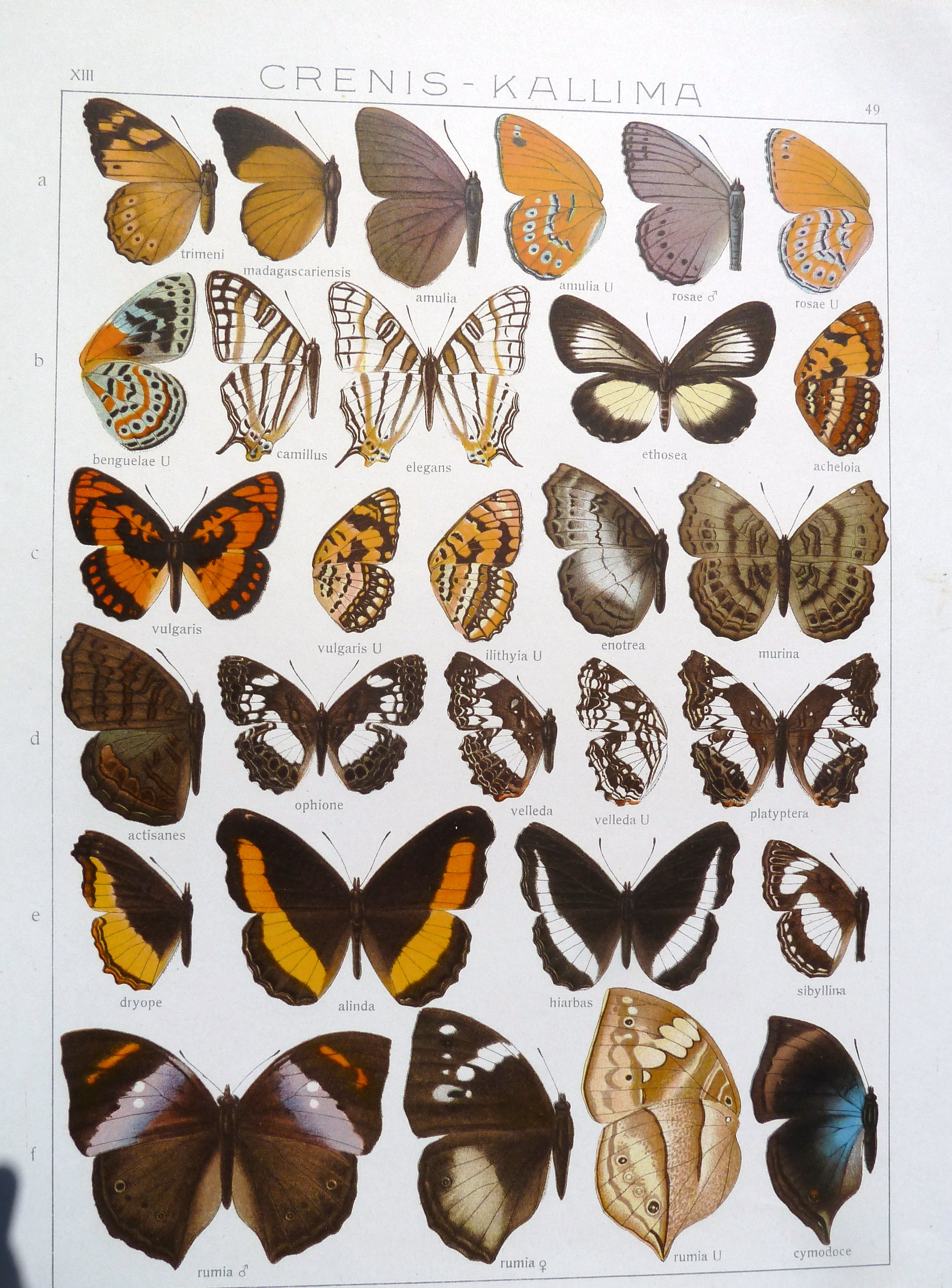
- In Adalbert Seitz's Fauna Africana

Scientific classification
- Domain: Eukaryota
- Kingdom: Animalia
- Phylum: Arthropoda
- Class: Insecta
- Order: Lepidoptera
- Family: Nymphalidae
- Genus: Sevenia
- Species: S. rosa

Binomial name
- Sevenia rosa (Hewitson, 1877)

Synonyms
- Crenis rosa Hewitson, 1877; Sallya rosa; Crenis mafiae Staudinger, 1897

= Sevenia rosa =

Rosa's tree nymph

Species of butterfly

Sevenia rosa, or Rosa's tree nymph, is a butterfly in the family Nymphalidae found in South Africa.

Wingspan: 50–60 mm in males and 52–62 mm in females.

Flight period is recorded as October to January but might be year round.

Larval food is Sapium ellipticum, Maprounes africana and Pseudolachnostylis species.
