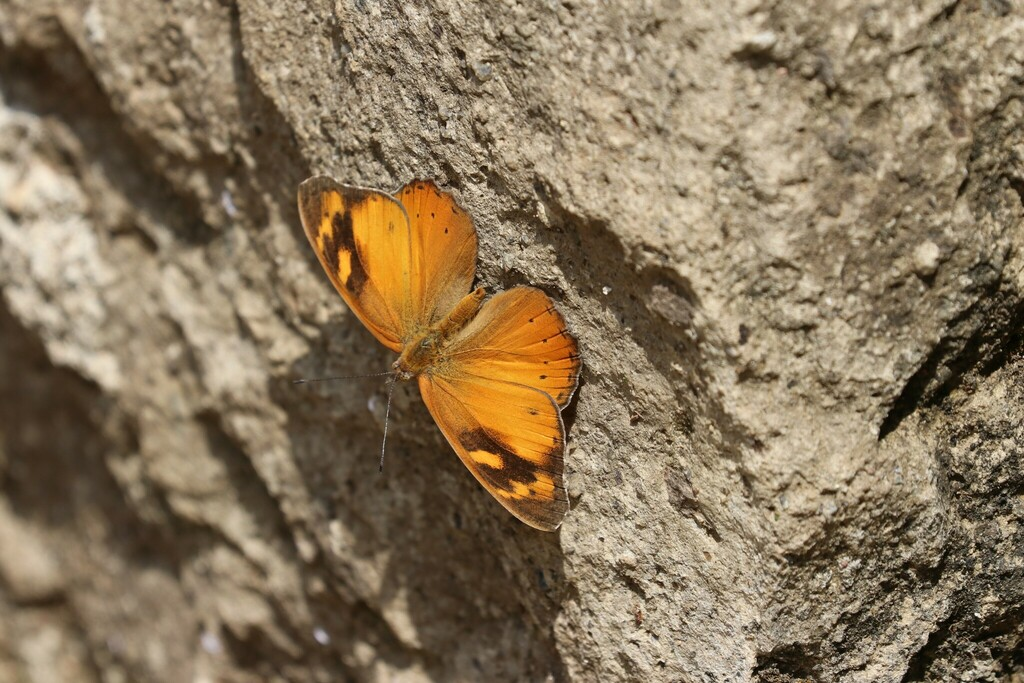

Scientific classification
- Kingdom: Animalia
- Phylum: Arthropoda
- Class: Insecta
- Order: Lepidoptera
- Family: Nymphalidae
- Genus: Sevenia
- Species: S. garega

Binomial name
- Sevenia garega (Karsch, 1892)

Synonyms
- Crenis garega Karsch, 1892; Sallya garega; Asterope ansorgei Rothschild and Jordan, 1903

= Sevenia garega =

Species of butterfly

Sevenia garega, the montane tree nymph, is a butterfly in the family Nymphalidae. It is found in eastern Nigeria, Cameroon, the Central African Republic, the Democratic Republic of the Congo, Uganda, Ethiopia, Kenya, north-western Tanzania, northern Zambia and Mozambique. The habitat consists of forests and woodland.

Adults are attracted to fermenting fruit.

The larvae feed on Sapium mannicum.
