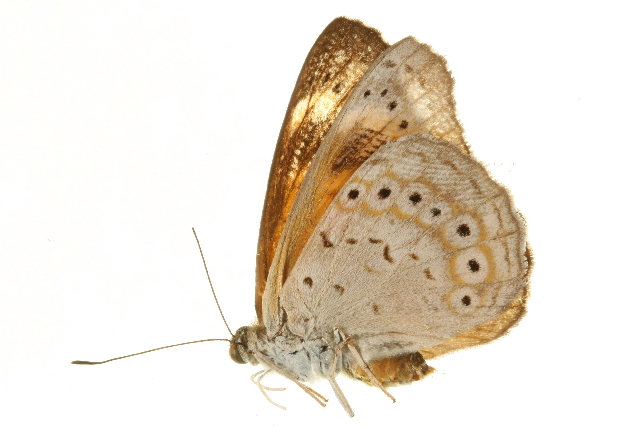

Scientific classification
- Kingdom: Animalia
- Phylum: Arthropoda
- Class: Insecta
- Order: Lepidoptera
- Family: Nymphalidae
- Genus: Sevenia
- Species: S. amazoula

Binomial name
- Sevenia amazoula (Mabille, 1880)

Synonyms
- Crenis amazoula Mabille, 1880; Sallya amazoula

= Sevenia amazoula =

Species of butterfly

Sevenia amazoula is a butterfly in the family Nymphalidae. It is found on Madagascar. The habitat consists of forests.
