= Moeran =

Moeran is a surname. Notable people with the surname include:

- Ernest John Moeran (1894–1950), English composer
- Edward Moeran (1903–1997), British politician

== See also ==
- Moran (surname)
