= Morand (surname) =

Morand is a French surname.

== List of people with the surname ==
- Blaise-Ernest Morand (born 1932), Canadian Roman Catholic bishop
- Charles Antoine Morand (1771–1835), French Napoleonic general
- Joseph Morand (1757-1813), French general
- Maxine Morand (born 1959), Australian politician
- Paul Morand (1888–1976), French writer
- Sandrine Morand (born 1979), French curler

== See also ==
- Moran (surname)
