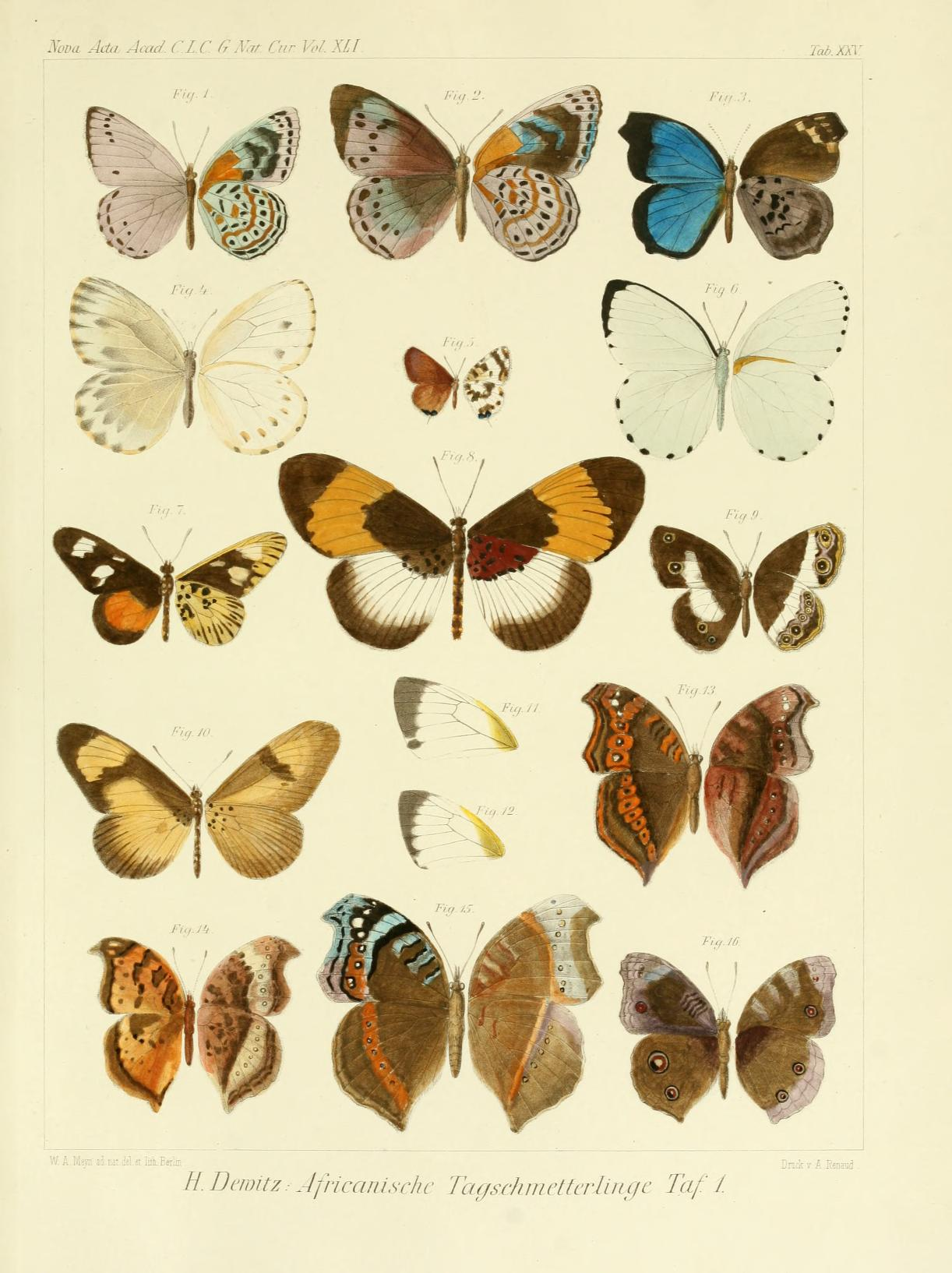

Scientific classification
- Kingdom: Animalia
- Phylum: Arthropoda
- Clade: Pancrustacea
- Class: Insecta
- Order: Lepidoptera
- Family: Nymphalidae
- Genus: Sevenia
- Species: S. benguelae

Binomial name
- Sevenia benguelae (Chapman, 1872)

Synonyms
- Crenis benguelae Chapman, 1872; Sallya benguelae

= Sevenia benguelae =

Species of butterfly

Sevenia benguelae is a butterfly in the family Nymphalidae. It is found in Tanzania (from the western part of the country to the Kigoma district), the Republic of the Congo, the central and western part of the Democratic Republic of the Congo, Angola, western Zambia and Namibia. The habitat consists of savanna woodland.

Adults are attracted to fermenting fruit.

The larvae feed on Maprounea africana.
