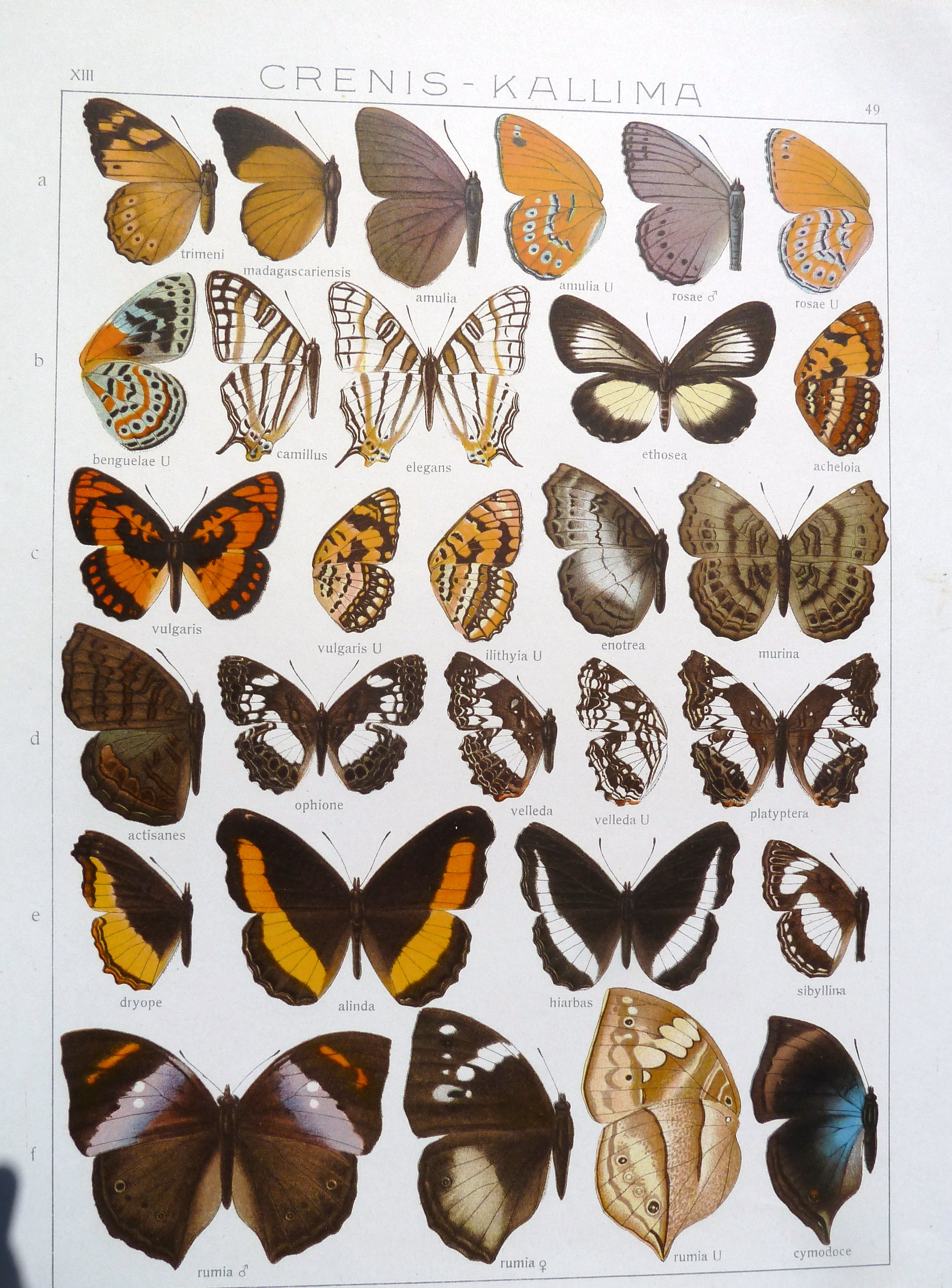
- In Adalbert Seitz's Fauna Africana

Scientific classification
- Domain: Eukaryota
- Kingdom: Animalia
- Phylum: Arthropoda
- Class: Insecta
- Order: Lepidoptera
- Family: Nymphalidae
- Genus: Sevenia
- Species: S. trimeni

Binomial name
- Sevenia trimeni (Aurivillius, 1899)

Synonyms
- Crenis natalensis var. trimeni Aurivillius, 1899; Crenis trimeni Aurivillius, 1899; Sallya trimeni (Aurivillius, 1899); Asterope trimeni (Aurivillius, 1899); Crenis trimeni angolensis Rothschild, 1918; Crenis trimenii major Rothschild, 1918

= Sevenia trimeni =

Species of butterfly

Sevenia trimeni, Trimen's tree nymph or pale tree nymph, is a butterfly in the family Nymphalidae. It is found in Sub-Saharan Africa, with records from Cameroon, Gabon, the Democratic Republic of the Congo, Angola, Zambia and Namibia. The habitat consists of marshy areas bordered by medium tree cover.

Adults are on wing year round. The wingspan is up to 50 mm (2.0 in).

== Subspecies ==
There are two subspecies:

- Sevenia trimeni trimeni – Angola, northern Namibia, Zambia
- Sevenia trimeni major (Rothschild, 1918) – Cameroon to Gabon and the Democratic Republic of the Congo
