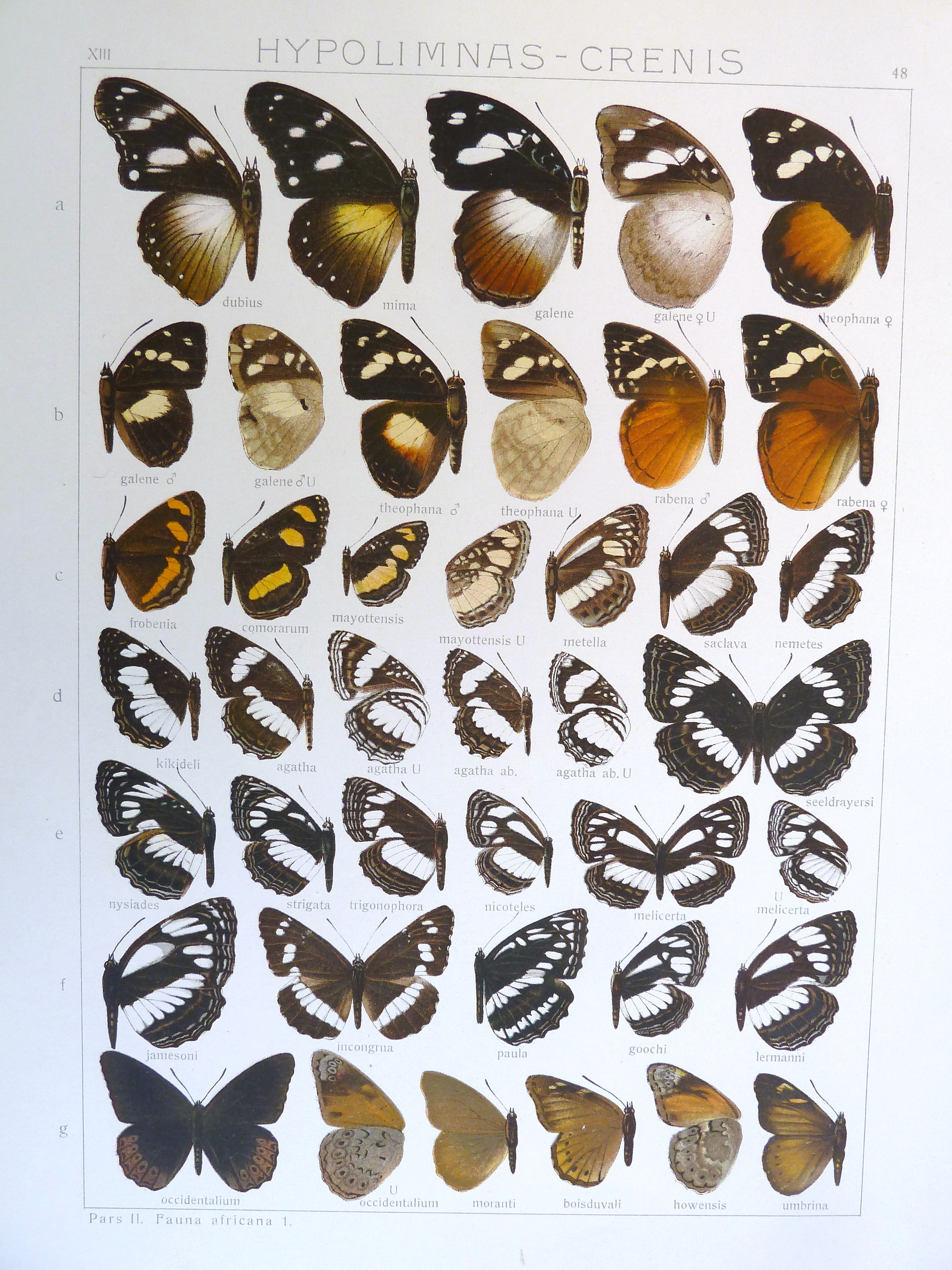
- In Adalbert Seitz's Fauna Africana

Scientific classification
- Kingdom: Animalia
- Phylum: Arthropoda
- Class: Insecta
- Order: Lepidoptera
- Family: Nymphalidae
- Genus: Sevenia
- Species: S. howensis

Binomial name
- Sevenia howensis (Staudinger, 1886)

Synonyms
- Crenis howensis Staudinger, 1886; Sallya howensis

= Sevenia howensis =

Species of butterfly

Sevenia howensis is a butterfly in the family Nymphalidae. It is found on Madagascar. The habitat consists of forests.
