= John Moran =

John Moran may refer to:

== People ==
=== Arts and entertainment people ===
- John Moran (cellist) (born 1963), American musician and musicologist
- John Moran (composer) (born 1965), American composer
- John Moran (photographer) (1831–1902), American photographer and artist
- Jackie Moran (1923–1990), American actor

=== Politicians ===
- John A. Moran (born 1932), American businessman, Republican Party donor
- John B. Moran (1859–1909), American politician, District Attorney of Suffolk County, Massachusetts
- John Edward Moran (1897–1962), American politician, mayor of Burlington, Vermont
- John F. Moran, American politician. Massachusetts state representative.
- John P. Moran, member of the Los Angeles, California, Common Council
- John Moran (mayor of Limerick), Irish civic official

=== Sportspeople ===
- John Moran (rugby league), Australian rugby league player
- Jack Moran (1906–1959), English footballer
- John Moran (footballer, born 1906) (1906-1975), English footballer, see List of Bury F.C. players (1–24 appearances)
- Jack Moran (Australian footballer) (1919–1979), Australian rules footballer
- Jack Moran (boxer) (1894–1966), American boxer
- Jack Moran (broadcaster) (1920–1997), American sportscaster

=== Other people ===
- John Moran (geneticist), American scientist
- John Moran (Medal of Honor) (1830–1905), American soldier
- John E. Moran (1856–1930), Philippine-American War Medal of Honor recipient

== Other meanings ==
- SS John V. Moran, ship that sank in Lake Michigan in 1899

== See also ==
- John Moran Bailey (1904–1975), American political figure
- John Wilson, 2nd Baron Moran (1924–2014), British soldier and diplomat
