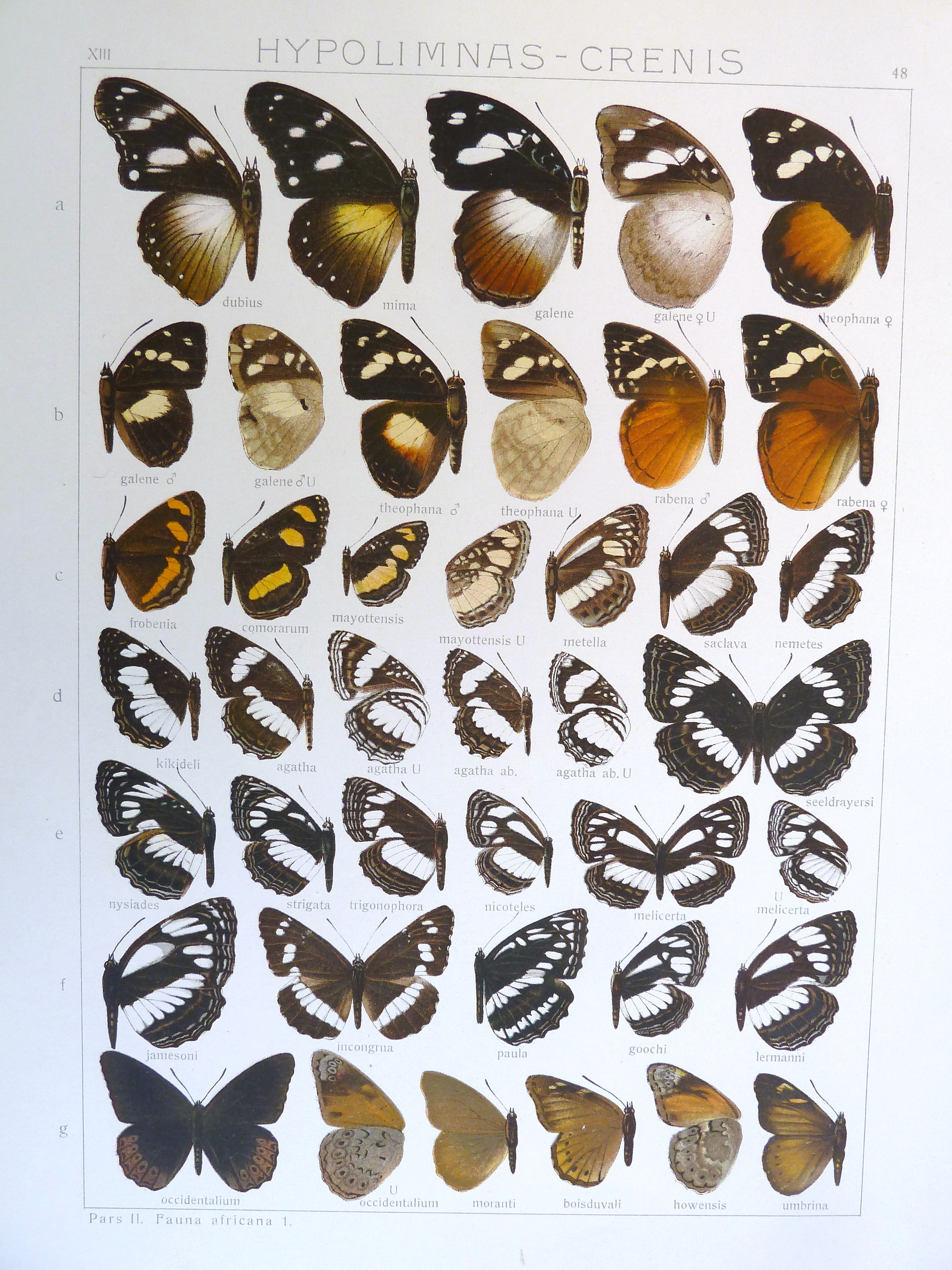
- In Adalbert Seitz's Fauna Africana

Scientific classification
- Kingdom: Animalia
- Phylum: Arthropoda
- Class: Insecta
- Order: Lepidoptera
- Family: Nymphalidae
- Genus: Sevenia
- Species: S. umbrina

Binomial name
- Sevenia umbrina (Karsch, 1892)

Synonyms
- Crenis umbrina Karsch, 1892; Sallya umbrina

= Sevenia umbrina =

Species of butterfly

Sevenia umbrina, the ochreous tree nymph, is a butterfly in the family Nymphalidae. It is found in Guinea, Burkina Faso, Sierra Leone, Ivory Coast, Ghana, Togo, Benin, Nigeria, Cameroon, the Democratic Republic of the Congo, Uganda, western Ethiopia, western Kenya, western Tanzania and northern Zambia. The habitat consists of forests, forest margins and riparian vegetation.

Adults are attracted to fermenting fruit.
