= Jimmy Moran (disambiguation) =

Jimmy Moran (1935–2020) is a Scottish former footballer.

Jimmy Moran may also refer to:

- Jimmy Moran (cyclist), winner of 1910 Six Days of Boston
- Jimmy Moran, character in the 1937 film The 13th Man

== See also ==
- James Moran (disambiguation)
