= Joe Moran =

Joe or Joseph Moran may refer to:

- Joe Moran (footballer) (1880–?), Welsh football player
- Joe Moran (hurler) (born 1987), Irish hurler
- Joe Moran (social historian), social and cultural historian
- Joe Moran, a character in the film Babes in Arms
- Joseph P. Moran (1895–1934), physician to the mob
