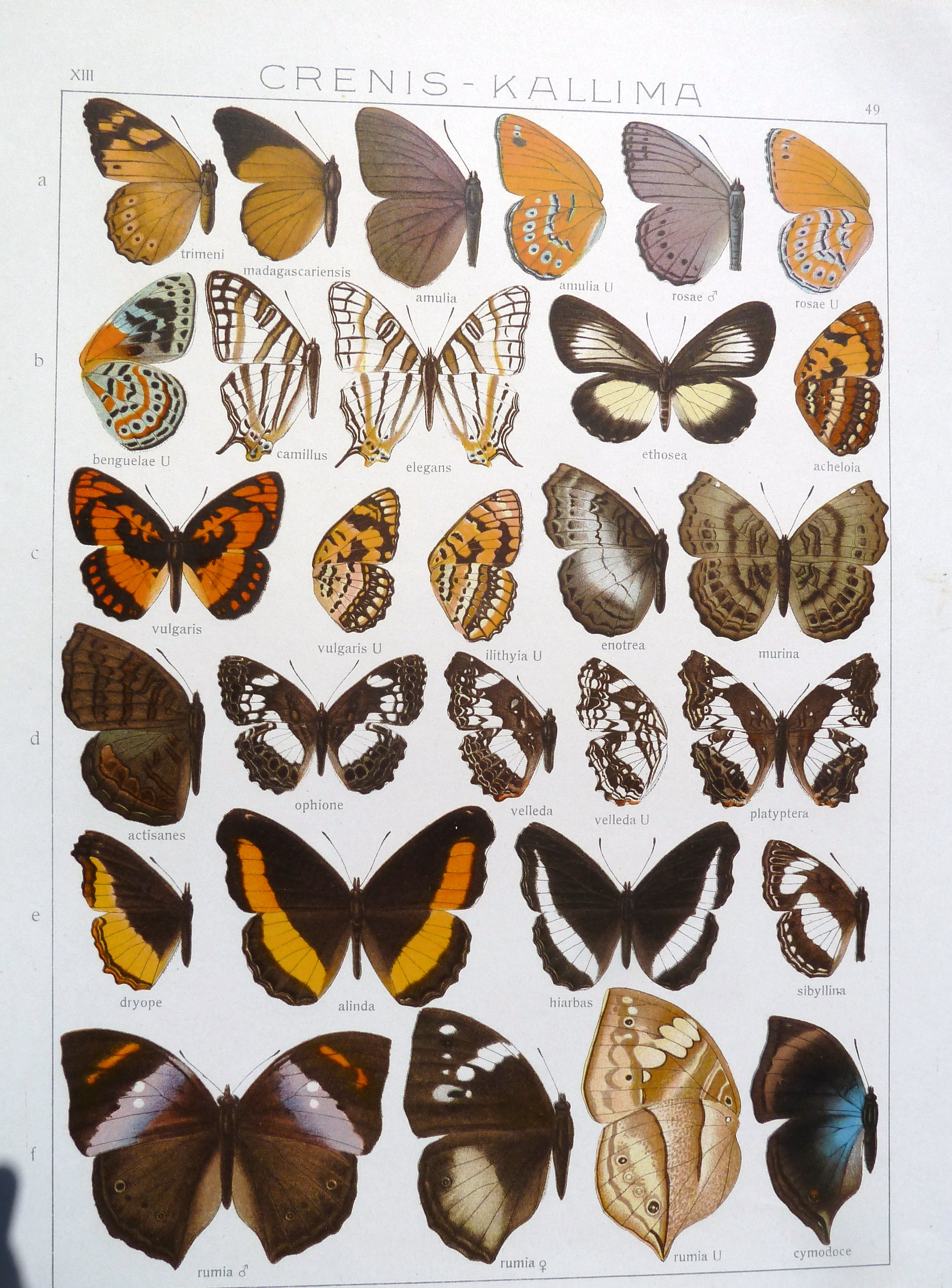
- In Adalbert Seitz's Fauna Africana

Scientific classification
- Kingdom: Animalia
- Phylum: Arthropoda
- Class: Insecta
- Order: Lepidoptera
- Family: Nymphalidae
- Genus: Sevenia
- Species: S. madagascariensis

Binomial name
- Sevenia madagascariensis (Boisduval, 1833)

Synonyms
- Crenis madagascariensis Boisduval, 1833; Sallya madagascariensis

= Sevenia madagascariensis =

Species of butterfly

Sevenia madagascariensis is a butterfly in the family Nymphalidae. It is found on Madagascar. The habitat consists of forests.
