= Sevenia silvicola =

Scientific classification
- Kingdom: Animalia
- Phylum: Arthropoda
- Class: Insecta
- Order: Lepidoptera
- Family: Nymphalidae
- Genus: Sevenia
- Species: S. silvicola

Binomial name
- Sevenia silvicola (Schultze, 1917)

Synonyms
- Crenis silvicola Schultze, 1917; Sallya silvicola

Species of butterfly

Sevenia silvicola is a butterfly in the family Nymphalidae. It is found in Cameroon.
