= Morland (surname) =

Morland is a surname. Notable people with the surname include:

- David Morland IV (born 1969), Canadian golfer
- Egbert Coleby Morland (1874–1955), English physician and medical editor
- George Morland (1763–1804), English painter
- Henry Robert Morland (1716/9 – 30 November 1797), English portrait artist
- Henry Morland (1837–1891), British Indian administrator, Governor of Bombay Presidency
- Howard Morland (born 1942), American journalist and anti-nuclear weapons activist
- Kjetil Mørland, Norwegian singer-songwriter
- Michael Morland (born 1929), British judge
- Paul Morland, British demographer
- Samuel Morland (1625–1695), English diplomat, spy, inventor, and mathematician
- Thomas Morland (1865–1925), British World War I general
- Toby Morland (born 1980), New Zealand rugby player

Fictional characters:

- Catherine Morland, heroine of Jane Austen's novel Northanger Abbey
