= Sevenia consors =

Scientific classification
- Kingdom: Animalia
- Phylum: Arthropoda
- Class: Insecta
- Order: Lepidoptera
- Family: Nymphalidae
- Genus: Sevenia
- Species: S. consors

Binomial name
- Sevenia consors (Rothschild & Jordan, 1903)

Synonyms
- Asterope consors Rothschild & Jordan, 1903; Sallya consors

Species of butterfly

Sevenia consors is a butterfly in the family Nymphalidae. It is found in Angola, western Zambia, the southern part of the Democratic Republic of the Congo and the Republic of the Congo.
