= Tom Moran (disambiguation) =

Tom Moran (born 1987) is a British comic writer.

Tom Moran may also refer to:

- Tom Moran (blocking back) (1899–1933), American football player
- Tom Moran (end) (1932–2013), Canadian football player
- Tom Moran (journalist), American journalist

== See also ==
- Thomas Moran (disambiguation)
