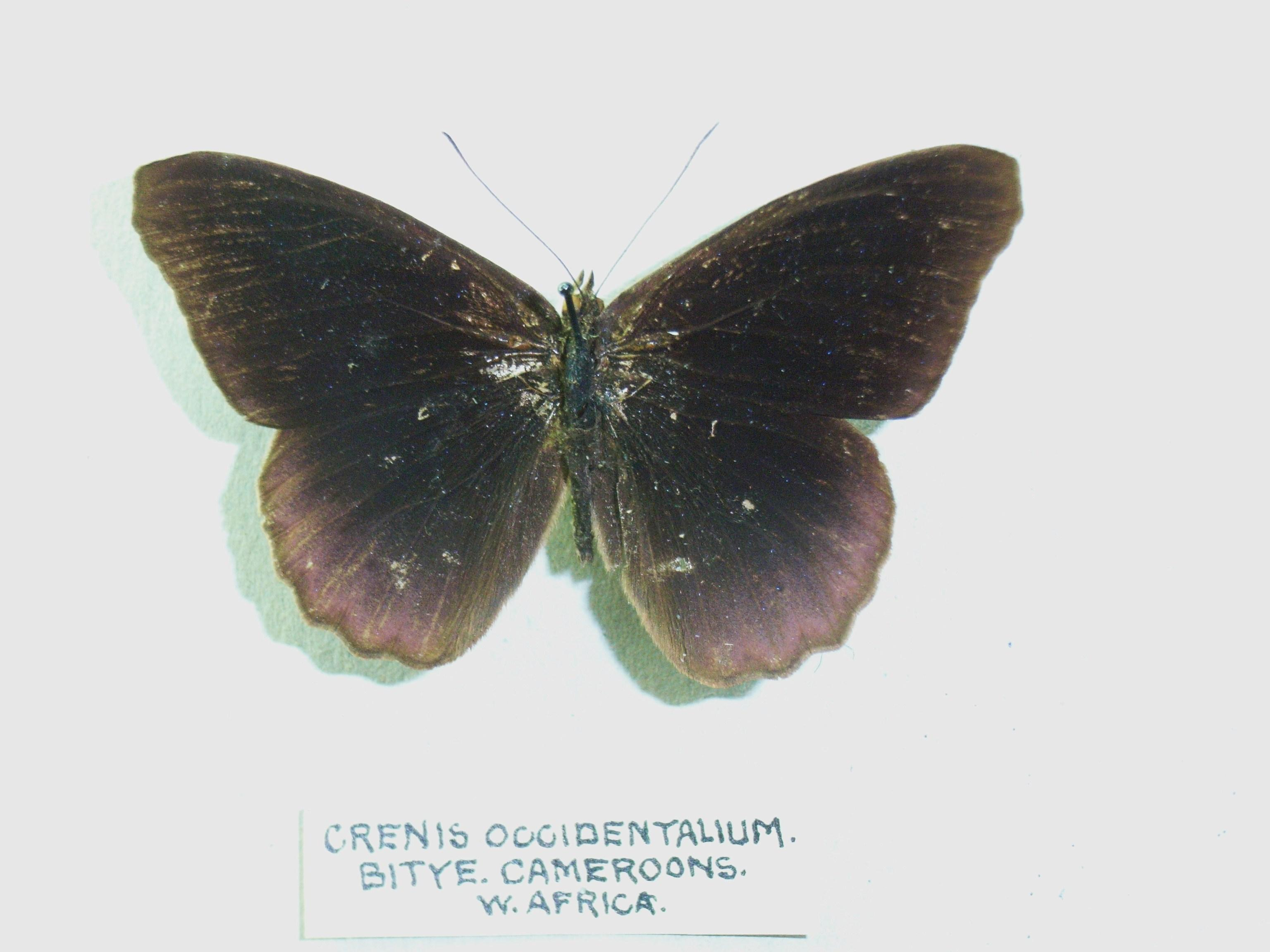

Scientific classification
- Kingdom: Animalia
- Phylum: Arthropoda
- Clade: Pancrustacea
- Class: Insecta
- Order: Lepidoptera
- Family: Nymphalidae
- Genus: Sevenia
- Species: S. occidentalium

Binomial name
- Sevenia occidentalium (Mabille, 1876)

Synonyms
- Crenis occidentalium Mabille, 1876; Sallya occidentalium; Crenis vadimonis Druce, 1878; Asterope occidentalium penricei Rothschild & Jordan, 1903; Crenis ribbei Dewitz, 1879

= Sevenia occidentalium =

Species of butterfly

Sevenia occidentalium is a butterfly in the family Nymphalidae. It is found in Sierra Leone, Côte d'Ivoire, Ghana, Nigeria, Cameroon, Gabon, the Republic of the Congo, the Central African Republic, the Democratic Republic of the Congo, Ethiopia, Uganda, Rwanda, Kenya, Tanzania, Zambia and Angola. The habitat consists of forests.

There may be massive population irruptions, leading to migratory behaviour. Adults males mud-puddle and have also been recorded on civet droppings.

The larvae feed on Macaranga schweinfurthii and Sapium species (including Sapium ellipticum).

== Subspecies ==
- Sevenia occidentalium occidentalium (Sierra Leone, Côte d'Ivoire, Ghana, Nigeria: south and the Cross River loop, Cameroon, Gabon, Congo, Democratic Republic of the Congo, Ethiopia, Uganda, western Kenya, western Tanzania, Zambia)
- Sevenia occidentalium penricei (Rothschild & Jordan, 1903) (Angola)

Torben Larsen developed a species numbering system for his 2005 publication Butterflies of West Africa. The nominate subspecies is #837. The 'Larsen' numbers have since been used with permission in A Sharp Eye on Butterflies of Ghana.
