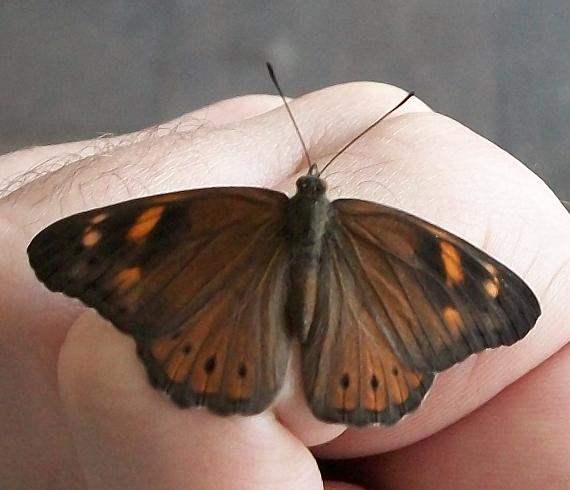
- Female S. b. boisduvali
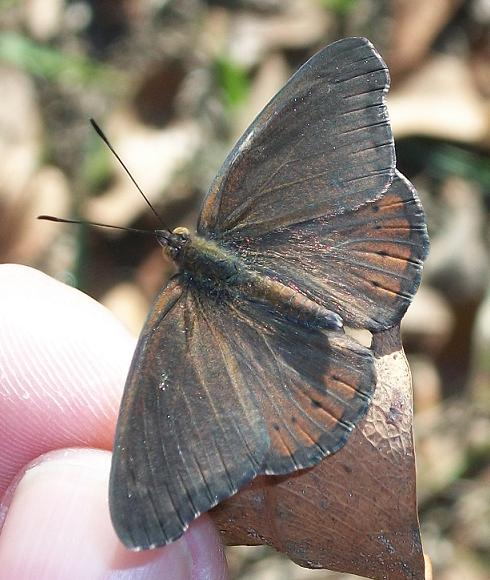
- Male S. b. boisduvali

Scientific classification
- Kingdom: Animalia
- Phylum: Arthropoda
- Clade: Pancrustacea
- Class: Insecta
- Order: Lepidoptera
- Family: Nymphalidae
- Genus: Sevenia
- Species: S. boisduvali

Binomial name
- Sevenia boisduvali (Wallengren, 1857)

Synonyms
- Crenis boisduvali Wallengren, 1857; Asterope boisduvali; Sallya boisduvali; Asterope boisduvali kaffana Rothschild & Jordan, 1903; Crenis boisduvali kaffana ab. uniformis Ungemach, 1932; Crenis boisduvali insularis Joicey & Talbot, 1926; Crenis boisduvalii omissa Rothschild, 1918

= Sevenia boisduvali =

Boisduval's tree nymph

Species of butterfly

Sevenia boisduvali, the Boisduval's tree nymph, is a butterfly in the family Nymphalidae. There are four subspecies; all native to Africa.

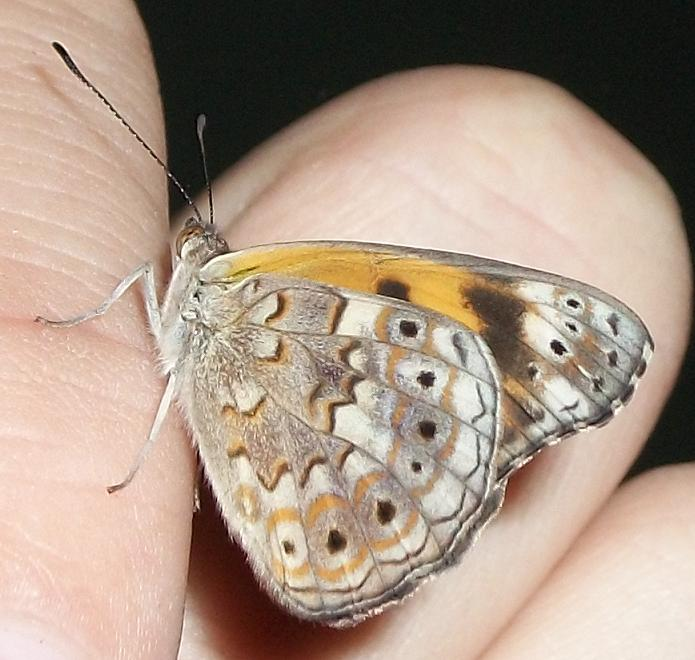
Female

== Description ==
The following is a description for S. b. boisduvali:

The wingspan of Boisduval's tree nymph is 40–45 mm. The upper surface of the wings of the male are uniform dark brown, with small dark spots near the fringe of the hindwings. The female has an overall lighter brown colour on the upper surface, and orange-brown markings near the tips of the forewings. The dark spots near the fringe of the hindwings are more pronounced in females. The undersurface of the hindwings of both sexes are variegated grey and brown, and have an arc of seven dark spots encircled firstly by a greyish ring, and then an orange-brown ring. The undersurface of the forewing is orange brown with a row of four black spots near the tip. The female forewing also has two dark brown bands.

== Distribution and habitat ==
Boisduval's tree nymph is found in the warmer, forested areas of Africa. The four subspecies are found in different regions:

- S. b. boisduvali favours coastal forests, but may also be found in temperate forests. This subspecies is found from Cape Town, along the east coast of South Africa, through Swaziland and Mozambique, to eastern Zimbabwe. They are most common in the low-altitude (coastal) areas of KwaZulu-Natal and in eastern Mpumalanga, South Africa.
- S. b. omissa (Rothschild, 1918) is found from Sierra Leone to the Democratic Republic of the Congo, Uganda, and western Kenya.
- S. b. kaffana (Rothschild & Jordan, 1903) is found in Ethiopia.
- S. b. insularis (Joicey & Talbot, 1926) is found on São Tomé.

Torben Larsen developed a species numbering system for his 2005 publication Butterflies of West Africa. The subspecies omissa is #838. The 'Larsen' numbers have since been used with permission in A Sharp Eye on Butterflies of Ghana.

== Life cycle ==
=== Eggs ===
The female lays a group of eggs on the undersurface of a leaf of the larval food plant. The eggs are yellowish at first, but change to brown as the larvae develop within.

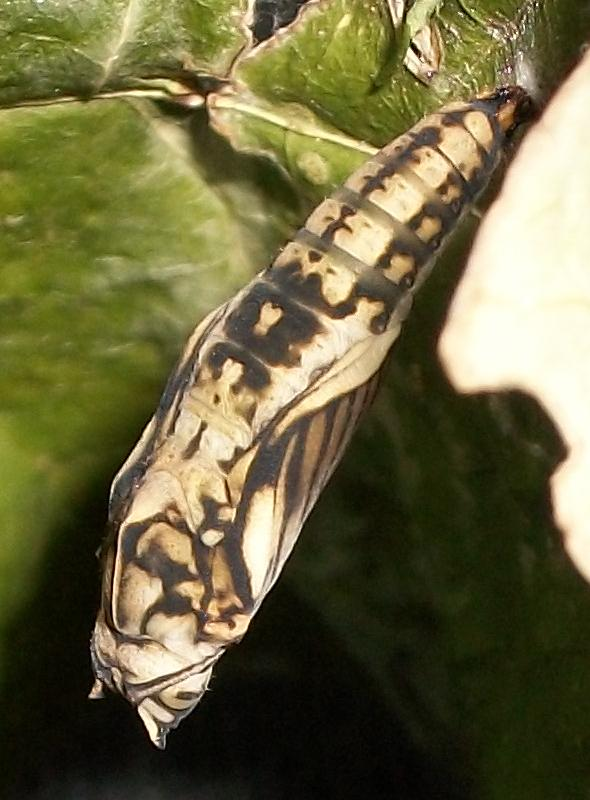
A dark-patterned male pupa

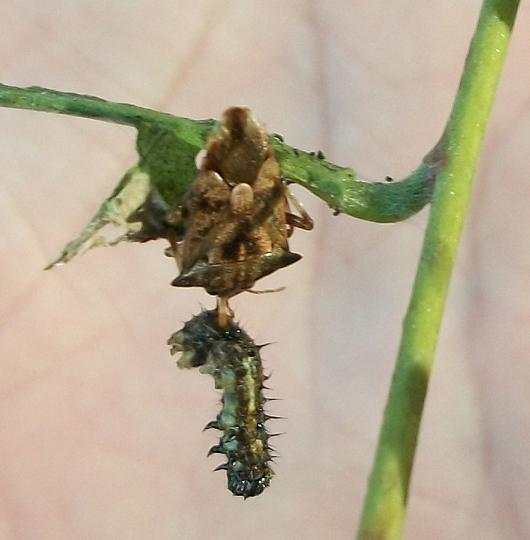
An assassin bug feeding on a larva

=== Larvae ===
The larval food plants in Southern Africa are Sclerocroton integerrimus (Sapium integerrimum) and the jumping-seed tree (Sclerocroton ellipticus). In Kenya, the larva have been recorded on Excoecaria, Phyllanthus, Macaranga, Kigelia and Sterculia. The larvae are gregarious and at first only eat the upper layer of the leaves, working from the tip to the base, and leaving a pale green dead leaf behind. As they grow older, the larvae begin to eat the entire leaf, starting at the leaf margin. Sometimes the larvae defoliate individual trees.

The full-grown larvae attach their rear ends to a leaf or branch with a small patch of silk and hang with their heads down. After about a day or so, they shed their skin to reveal a pupa.

=== Pupae ===
After shedding its skin, the pupa hardens and remains in a fairly rigid position. However the pupa can twist from side to side when disturbed. The pupae are variable in colour; being green, or creamy brown with small dark markings, or brownish and dark patterned. The pupa takes about ten days to mature and hatch into a butterfly.

=== Adults ===
Once the butterfly has emerged from the shell of its pupa, it hangs with its wings downward. The wings inflate, unfurl and dry into shape. Adult Boisduval's tree nymphs usually keep to semi-shaded areas provided by trees. They often sit head downwards on the stems or larger branches of trees, usually with the wings held closed. The adults feed on fermented fruit and on tree sap, and the males are known to land on damp patches of ground to suck up moisture.

== Predators ==
Assassin bugs feed on the larvae.

== Life cycle gallery ==
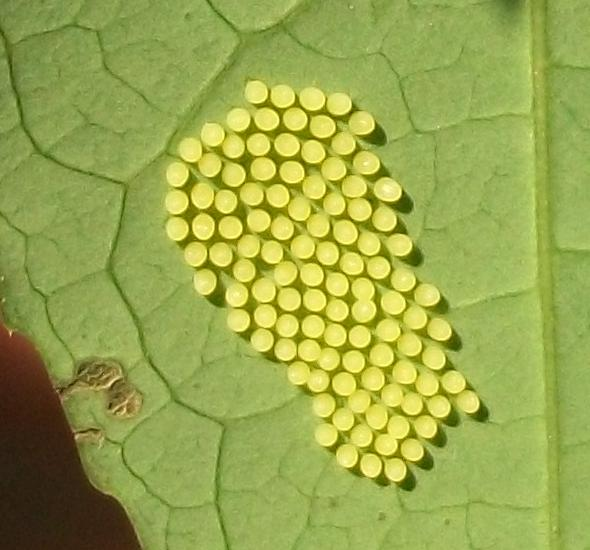
Recently laid eggs on a leaf of Sclerocroton integerrimus

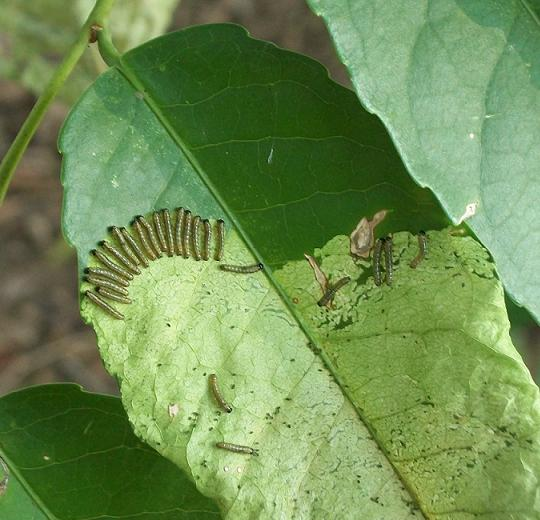
Young larvae feeding on Sclerocroton integerrimus

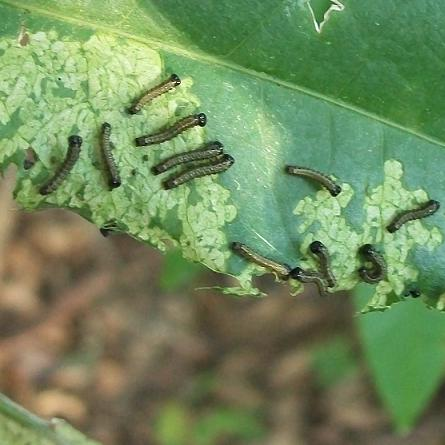
Slightly older larvae

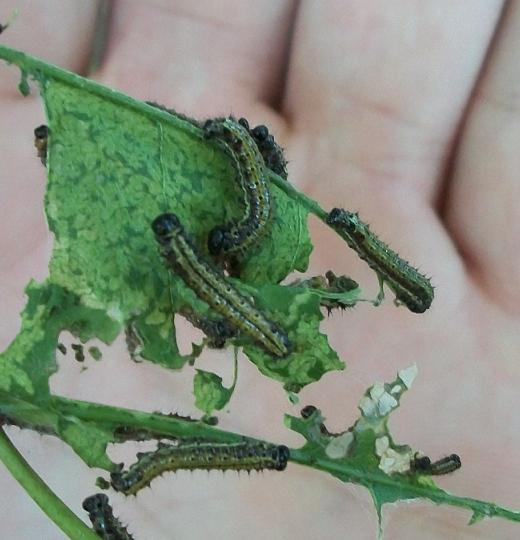
Larvae almost fully grown

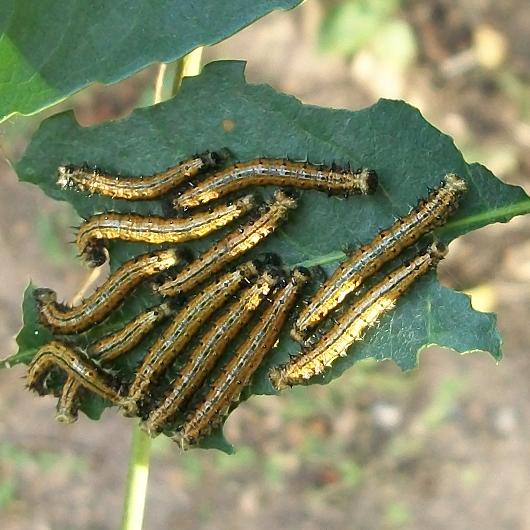
Full-grown larvae

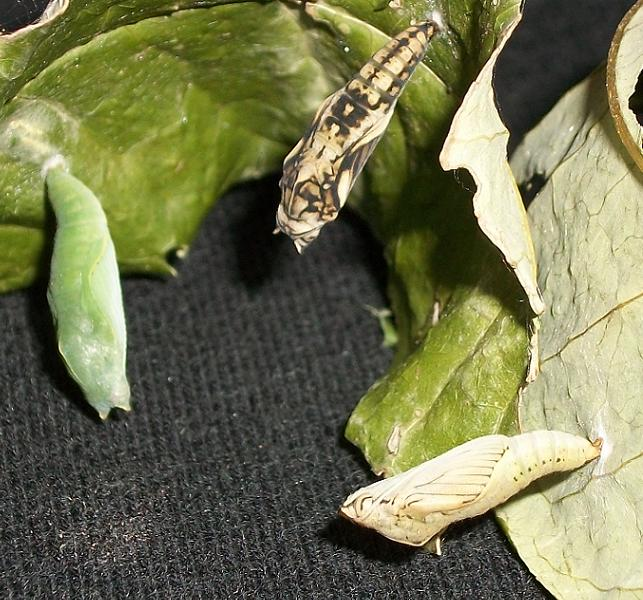
Three colour versions of the pupae

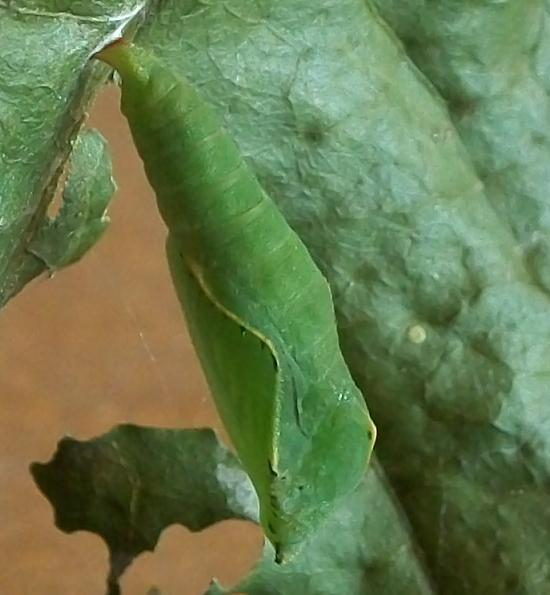
A green pupa

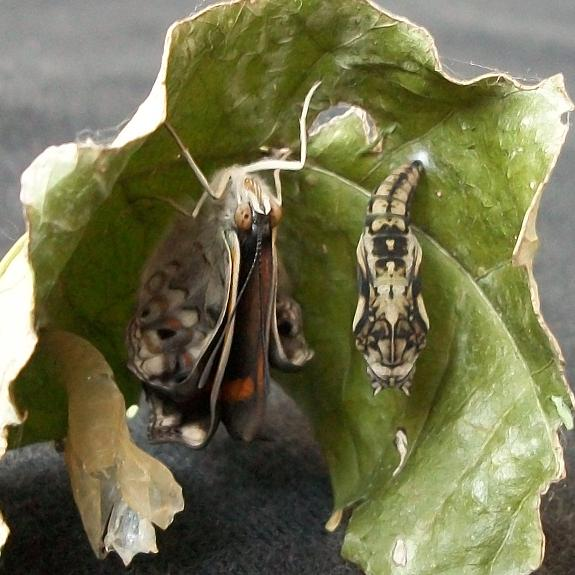
Female recently emerged from pupa

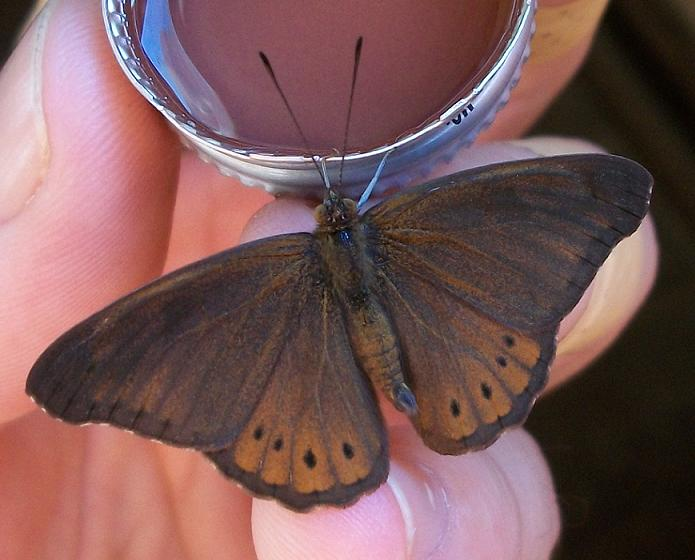
Male drinking apple and cranberry juice

== Emergence from pupa gallery ==
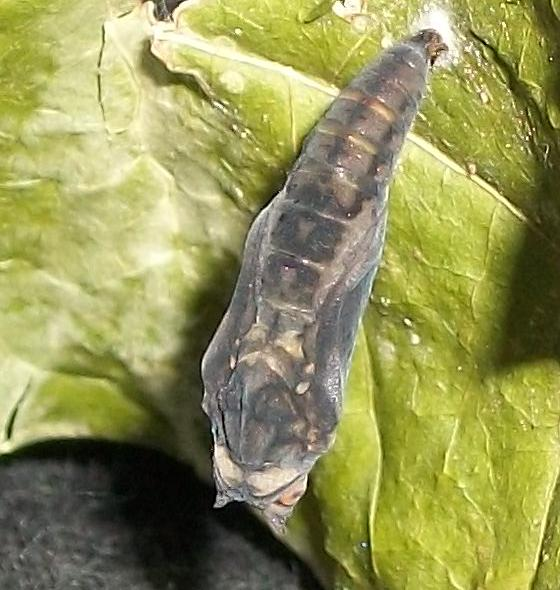
Pupa with dark colour before hatching

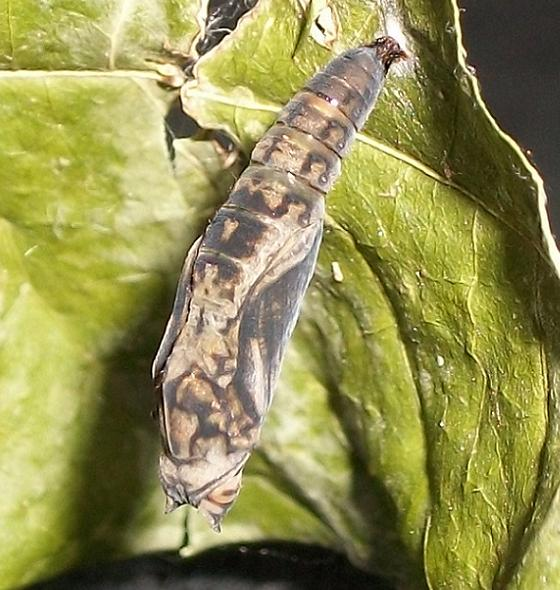
Pupa begins to return to original colour

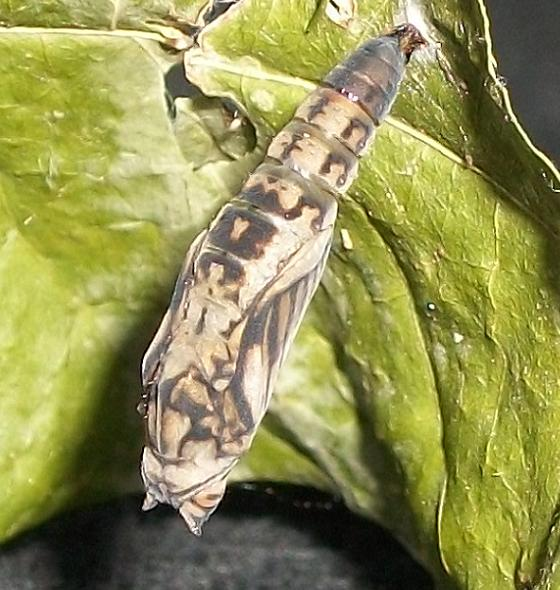
Back to original colour and pattern

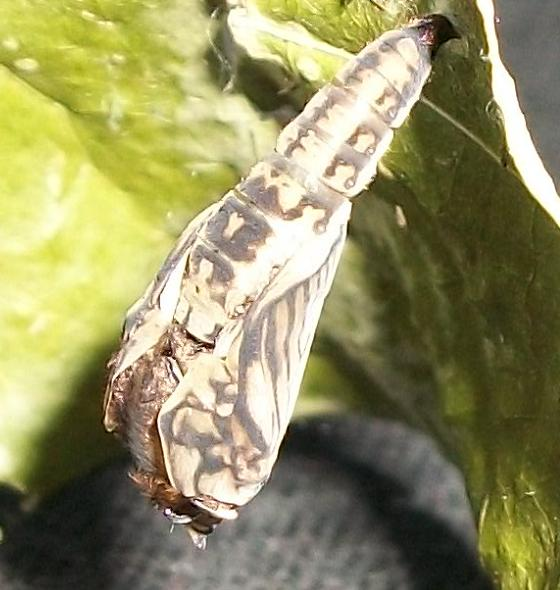
The shell at the head splits open

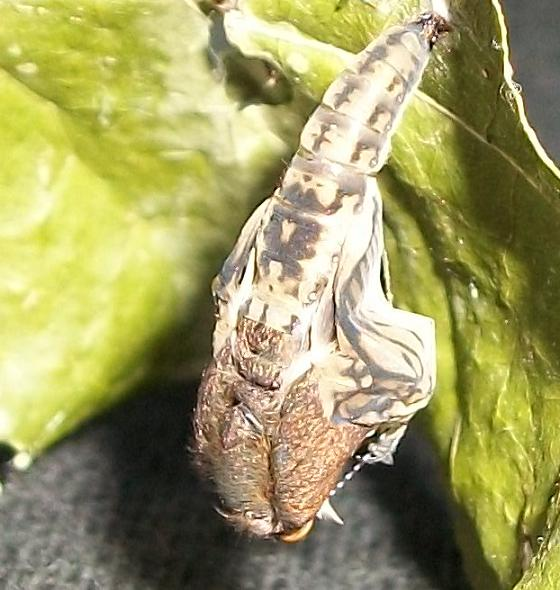
The butterfly begins to emerge

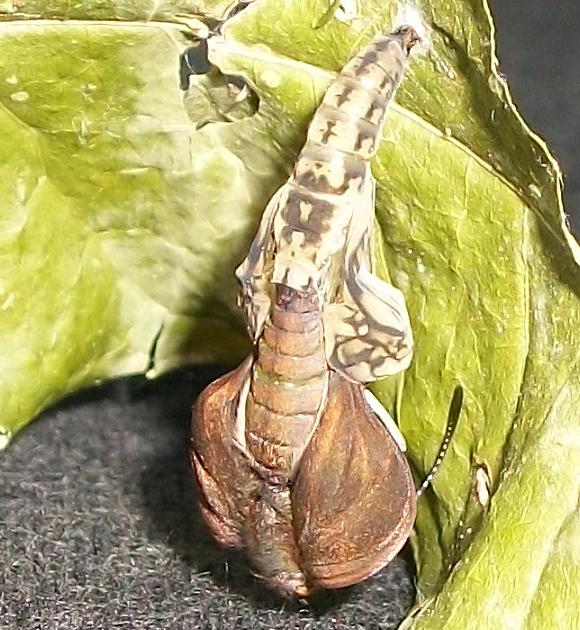
The butterfly just fully emerged

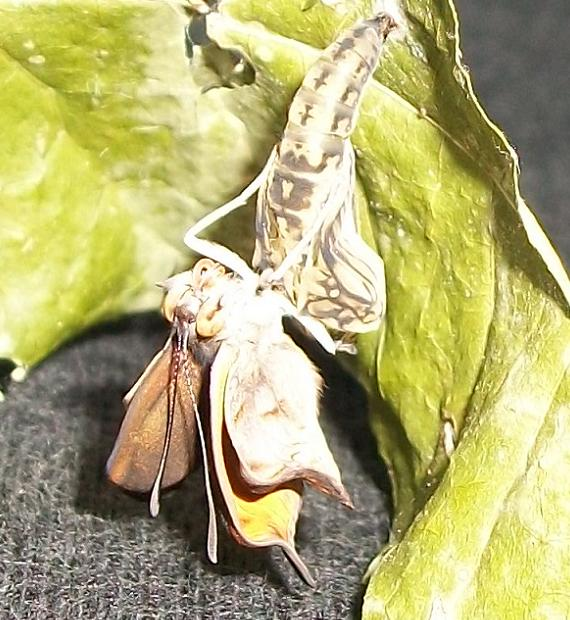
Emerged with wings crumpled

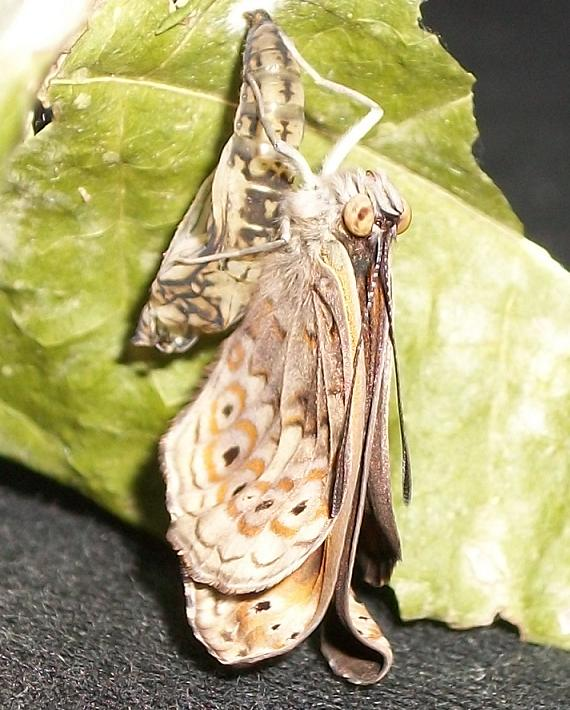
Climbing higher to allow the wings to enlarge

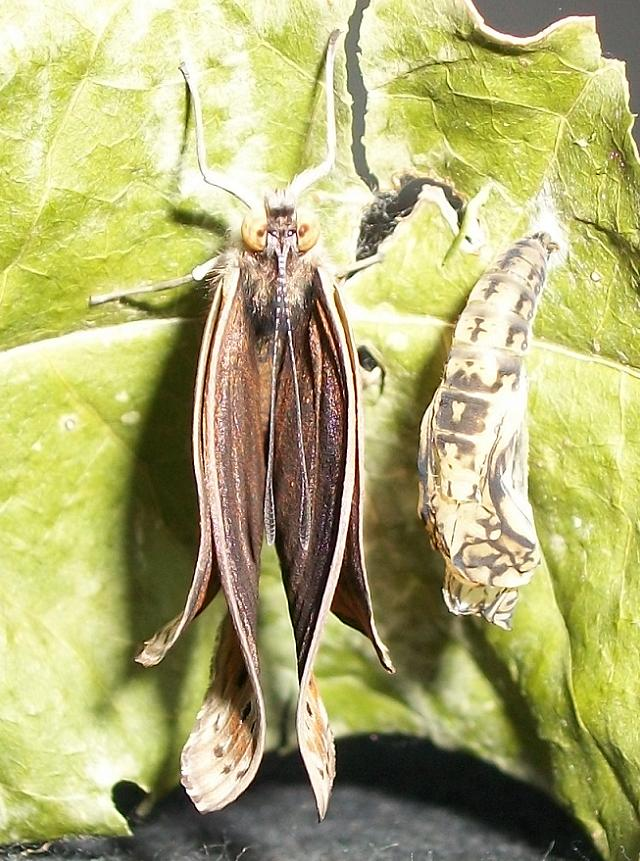
Fully extended wings drying into shape
