= John Moran (cellist) =

American musician

John Moran (born 1963) is an American musician and musicologist. He specializes in historically informed performance of music from the seventeenth through the twentieth centuries on the cello and viola da gamba. He studied cello and baroque cello at the Oberlin Conservatory, baroque cello at the Schola Cantorum Basiliensis, and musicology at King's College London. He has performed and recorded with numerous groups in Europe, including Les Musiciens du Louvre, The Consort of Musicke, English Baroque Soloists. Since 1994 he has lived in the Washington, D.C., area. He is a regular member of REBEL, a New York based baroque ensemble and the music director of Modern Musick, a Washington period-instrument ensemble. He has also appeared with Opera Lafayette, the Washington Bach Consort, the Folger Consort, the Smithsonian Chamber Orchestra and Chamber Players. He teaches viola da gamba and baroque cello at the Peabody Conservatory, where he is also co-director of the Baltimore Baroque Band. He served as President of the Viola da Gamba Society of America (2020–2024) and is currently Past President of that organization.

The Washington Post has called his Bach "eloquent", and praised the "bravado" of his Boccherini and the "nimble fluency" of his Vivaldi, while the LA Times has written, "Cellist Moran projected vigorous and expressive bass lines." He is a contributor to the revised New Grove Dictionary of Music (2001), reviews books on musical topics for various journals, and is writing a historical monograph on the cello for Yale University Press. He is married to the violinist Risa Browder.
