= Tom Moran (journalist) =

American journalist

Tom Moran is an American journalist. He is the editor of the Star-Ledger editorial page.
