= Richard Moran =

Richard Moran may refer to:

- Richard Moran (Australian footballer) (1887–1940), Australian rules footballer
- Richard Moran (author) (born 1950), American venture capitalist and author
- Richard Moran (camera operator), Australian camera operator
- Richard Moran (canoeist) (born 1932), American Olympic canoer
- Richard Moran (philosopher), philosopher who works at Harvard University
- Richard Allen Moran (1954–1996), American convicted murderer

== See also ==
- Rich Moran (born 1962), American football guard
- Richie Moran (footballer) (born 1963), British footballer, writer and anti-racism campaigner
- Richie Moran (lacrosse) (1937–2022), American lacrosse player and coach
