= Patrick Moran =

Patrick Moran may refer to:

- Patrick Moran (bishop) (1823–1895), priest and bishop in South Africa and New Zealand
- Patrick Moran (Irish republican) (1888–1921), one of The Forgotten Ten
- Patrick Moran (musician) (born 1975), Canadian musician
- Francis Moran (cardinal) (Patrick Francis Moran, 1830–1911), Irish-Australian Catholic archbishop and cardinal
- Pat Moran (1876–1924), American baseball player
- P. A. P. Moran (Patrick Alfred Pierce Moran, 1917–1988), Australian statistician
- Pat Moran (rugby league) (born 1998), Ireland international rugby league footballer

== See also ==
- Paddy Moran (disambiguation)
- Pat Moran McCoy, jazz pianist
- Pat Moran (filmmaker), actress
