= Robert Moran =

Robert Moran may refer to:

- Robert Moran (composer) (born 1937), American composer
- Robert Moran (shipbuilder) (1857–1943), American shipbuilder and mayor of Seattle
- Robert L. Moran (1884–1954), American politician in Bronx, New York

== See also ==
- Rob Moran, actor and producer
- Bob Moran, British cartoonist
