= William Moran =

William Moran or Bill Moran may refer to:

- William F. Moran (admiral) (born c. 1960), United States Navy admiral
- William F. Moran (knifemaker) (1925–2006), knifemaker who founded the American Bladesmith Society
- William H. Moran (1864–1946), United States Secret Service agent
- William Joseph Moran (1906–1996), Roman Catholic bishop
- William L. Moran (1921–2000), American Assyriologist
- William Thomas Alldis Moran (1903–1942), Australian naval officer
- Bill Moran (catcher) (1869–1916), catcher and left fielder in Major League Baseball
- Bill Moran (pitcher) (born 1950), American politician and retired baseball pitcher
- Billy Moran (born 1933), American baseball player
- Francis D. Moran (born 1935), also known as "Bill" Moran, American admiral, third Director of the National Oceanic and Atmospheric Administration Commissioned Officer Corps
