= Paddy Moran =

Paddy Moran may refer to:

- Paddy Moran (Gaelic footballer) (born 1967), former Dublin Gaelic football player
- Paddy Moran (hurler) (born 1939), Irish retired hurler
- Paddy Moran (ice hockey) (1877–1966), professional ice hockey goaltender
- Herbert Moran (1885–1945), Australian rugby union player, known as Paddy Moran

== See also ==
- Patrick Moran (disambiguation)
