= Paul Morland =

British demographer and author

Paul Morland is a British demographer and author whose work focuses on global population trends and their political, economic and social implications. He has written widely on demographic change for national and international media.

== Academic career and education ==
Morland was an associate research fellow at Birkbeck, University of London, and a senior member at St Antony’s College Oxford. He was educated at Corpus Christi College, University of Oxford, and St Antony’s College, Oxford, and received his PhD from Birkbeck, University of London.

== Publications ==
Morland has published several books examining demography, population policy and long-term social change. His works include:

- Demographic Engineering: Population Strategies in Ethnic Conflict (Ashgate, 2014)
- The Human Tide: How Population Shaped the Modern World (PublicAffairs, 2019)
- Tomorrow’s People: The Future of Humanity in Ten Numbers (Pan Macmillan, 2023)
- No One Left: Why the World Needs More Children (Swift Press, 2024)

== Media and commentary ==
Morland is a regular contributor to public debate on population and demographic change. He has written for newspapers and magazines including The Daily Telegraph, the Financial Times, and the New Statesman, and has appeared in broadcast media discussing issues such as fertility decline, ageing societies, and population policy.

== Personal life ==
Morland is married and has three adult children and four grandchildren. He holds joint British and German nationality. His parents were German Jews who escaped from Nazi Germany.
