= James Michael Moran =

American astronomer

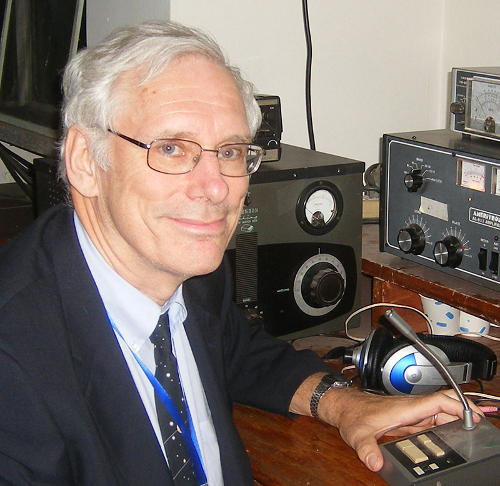
- Born: 3 January 1943; Plainfield, NJ, USA
- Citizenship: United States
- Education: B.S. University of Notre Dame (1963); S.M. Massachusetts Institute of Technology (1965); Ph.D. Massachusetts Institute of Technology (1968)
- Known for: radio astronomy radio interferometry

James Moran is an American radio astronomer living in Massachusetts, USA. He was a professor of Astronomy at Harvard University from 1989 through 2016, a senior radio astronomer at the Smithsonian Astrophysical Observatory from 1981 through 2020 and the director of the Submillimeter Array during its construction and early operational phases from 1995 through 2005. In 1998 he was elected to the National Academy of Sciences, in 2010 to the American Academy of Arts and Sciences, and in 2020 to the American Philosophical Society. He is currently the Donald H. Menzel Professor of Astrophysics, Emeritus, at Harvard University.

Dr. Moran is perhaps best known for his VLBI studies of 22 GHz water maser emission from the nucleus of the galaxy NGC 4258 (M106). These observations provided compelling evidence of a supermassive black hole in the center of that galaxy, and a precise value for the black hole's mass. Monitoring of the proper motion of the individual maser spots in the black hole's accretion disk allowed a direct measurement of the distance to NGC 4258, which provided an important calibrator for the use of Cepheid variable stars as distance indicators.

Dr. Moran wrote, along with Richard Thompson and George Swenson, a comprehensive graduate-level textbook on radio interferometry: Interferometry and Synthesis in Radio Astronomy, the third edition of which was published in 2017. It is an open-access book, available for free online.

Dr. Moran was the thesis advisor for 13 Ph.D. students during his time as a Harvard professor.

== Awards ==
- Rumford Prize (1971) (shared), American Academy of Arts and Sciences
- Outstanding Publication Award (1975) (shared), Naval Research Laboratory
- Newton Lacy Pierce Prize (1978), American Astronomical Society
- Outstanding Publication Award (1979) (shared), Naval Research Laboratory
- Senior Humboldt Award (1992), Alexander von Humboldt Stiftung
- Jansky Lectureship (1996), National Radio Astronomy Observatory
- Grote Reber Gold Medal (2013), Grote Reber Foundation
- Diamond Achievement Award (2019) (shared with EHT team), National Science Foundation
- Breakthrough Prize in Fundamental Physics (2019) (shared with EHT team), Fundamental Physics Prize Foundation
- Bruno Rossi Prize (2020) (shared with EHT team), American Astronomical Society
- Oort Professorship (2020), Leiden University
- Group Achievement Award (2021) (shared with EHT team), Royal Astronomical Society
