= James Moran (American football) =

American football player and coach (1921–2005)

Jim Moran
Biographical details
- Born: July 29, 1921; Wilkes-Barre, Pennsylvania, U.S.
- Died: February 1, 2005 (aged 83); Wilkes-Barre, Pennsylvania, U.S.

Playing career
- 1941: Fordham
- 1944: Chatham Airfield
- 1946–1948: West Virginia
- 1948–1949: Wilkes-Barre Bullets

Coaching career (HC unless noted)
- 1952–1962: King's

Head coaching record
- Overall: 24–38–4

James A. Moran (July 29, 1921 – February 1, 2005) was an American football coach. He was the head football coach at King's College in Wilkes-Barre, Pennsylvania, a position he held from 1952 to 1962.

As a college athlete, he played in the 1942 Sugar Bowl for Fordham and the 1949 Sun Bowl for West Virginia, all while serving a four-year stint in the military during World War II.

== Head coaching record ==
Year	Team	Overall	Conference	Standing	Bowl/playoffs
King's Monarchs (Independent) (1952–1962)
1952	King's	4–3			
1953	King's	4–2–1			
1954	King's	3–3–1			
1955	King's	3–4			
1956	King's	3–5			
1957	King's	1–4–1			
1958	King's	1–6			
1959	King's	4–4			
1960	King's	1–7–1			
King's:		24–38–4			
Total:		24–38–4			
