= Joe Moran (footballer) =

Welsh footballer

Personal information
- Full name: Joseph Moran
- Date of birth: 1880
- Place of birth: Bangor, Wales
- Position: Outside left

Senior career*
Years	Team	Apps	(Gls)
−1903	Aston Villa	0	(0)
1903−1904	Doncaster Rovers		(12)
1904−1905	Leicester Fosse	1	(0)
- * Club domestic league appearances and goals

Joseph Moran (1880–?) was a Welsh footballer who played as an outside left mainly for Doncaster Rovers.

== Playing career ==
Bangor born Moran was first known as an Aston Villa player, though he made no appearances for them. In 1903 he moved to play for Doncaster Rovers in the Midland League and had a successful season there, scoring 12 league goals. Following that season Doncaster were elected to the Football League and Moran moved to Leicester Fosse then in the Second Division, though he only made one appearance for them, without scoring, in November 1904 against Lincoln City.
