= Regina Moran =

Irish engineer

- Education: Waterford Institute of Technology; Cork Institute of Technology; Dublin City University
- Occupation: Vodafone Enterprise Director

Regina Moran FIEI was CEO of Fujitsu Ireland and UK. She was the President for Engineers Ireland for 2014. She is a Fellow of Engineers of Ireland. Moran is currently Vodafone Enterprise Director and chair of THEA, the Technological Higher Education Authority.

== Biography ==
Regina Moran is from Clonmel, Co Tipperary. She completed her studies in Engineering with a certificate from Waterford Institute of Technology and finishing a diploma with Cork Institute of Technology. She later completed an MBA from Dublin City University. Moran won the Sir Charles Harvey Award for her post-graduate work. She was Director of Operations for DMR Consulting Ireland after she co-founded it in 1997. In April 2004 this company went on to become Fujitsu Consulting and then to merge with Fujitsu Services. Moran was made CEO of this group in August 2006. She went on to become CEO of Fujitsu Ireland when all Fujitsu companies merged in 2009 Ireland. She went on to hold the role as CEO of Fujitsu Ireland and UK and then on to more global positions. In 2018 she left Fujitsu to become Vodafone Enterprise Director.

Regina has been a board-member for the Irish Business Employers’ Confederation as well as a member of the Dublin City University governing authority. Moran has been a Non-Executive Director of EirGrid.

== See also ==
- Engineers Ireland
