= David Moran =

David Moran may refer to:

- David Moran (Bury footballer), footballer for Bury and Altrincham, see List of Bury F.C. players (1–24 appearances)
- David Moran (Gaelic footballer) (born 1988), Irish Gaelic footballer
- D. P. Moran (David Patrick Moran, 1869–1936), Irish journalist, activist and cultural-political theorist
- David Scott Moran (born 1998), Educator, Utility Locator
