= Paul Moran =

Paul Moran may refer to:

- Paul Moran (English footballer) (born 1968), retired English football forward
- Paul Moran (ice hockey) (born 1983), English ice hockey player
- Paul Moran (musician), British Hammond organist, pianist, trumpeter for Van Morrison
- Paul Moran (photojournalist) (1963–2003), first media person killed in the 2003 invasion of Iraq
- Paul Moran (soccer) (born 1983), American soccer player
