= Thomas Moran (disambiguation) =

Thomas Moran (1837–1926) was an American painter and printmaker.

Thomas Moran may also refer to:

- Thomas Moran (singer) (1876–1960), Irish ballad singer
- Thomas J. Moran (businessman) (1952–2018), American businessman and humanitarian
- Thomas J. Moran (judge) (1920–1995), American jurist
- Thomas P. Moran, engineer at the IBM Almaden Research Center
- Tommy Moran, leading member of the British Union of Fascists

== See also ==
- Tom Moran (disambiguation)
- Thomas Moran House, East Hampton, New York
