= Chris Moran (surgeon) =

British orthopaedic surgeon

Professor Christopher Gerrard Moran, MD FRCS OBE (b.1959) is a British orthopaedic surgeon who is a consultant trauma specialist at the Queen's Medical Centre in Nottingham and an honorary professor at the University of Nottingham. He is also a strategic incident director for NHS England and was, between 2013 and 2020, the National Clinical Director for Trauma in England.

Professor Moran is Honorary Colonel to 144 Medical Parachute Squadron and a civilian adviser on orthopaedic surgery to the Royal Air Force, and was made an Officer of the Order of the British Empire for services to trauma surgery in 2021.
