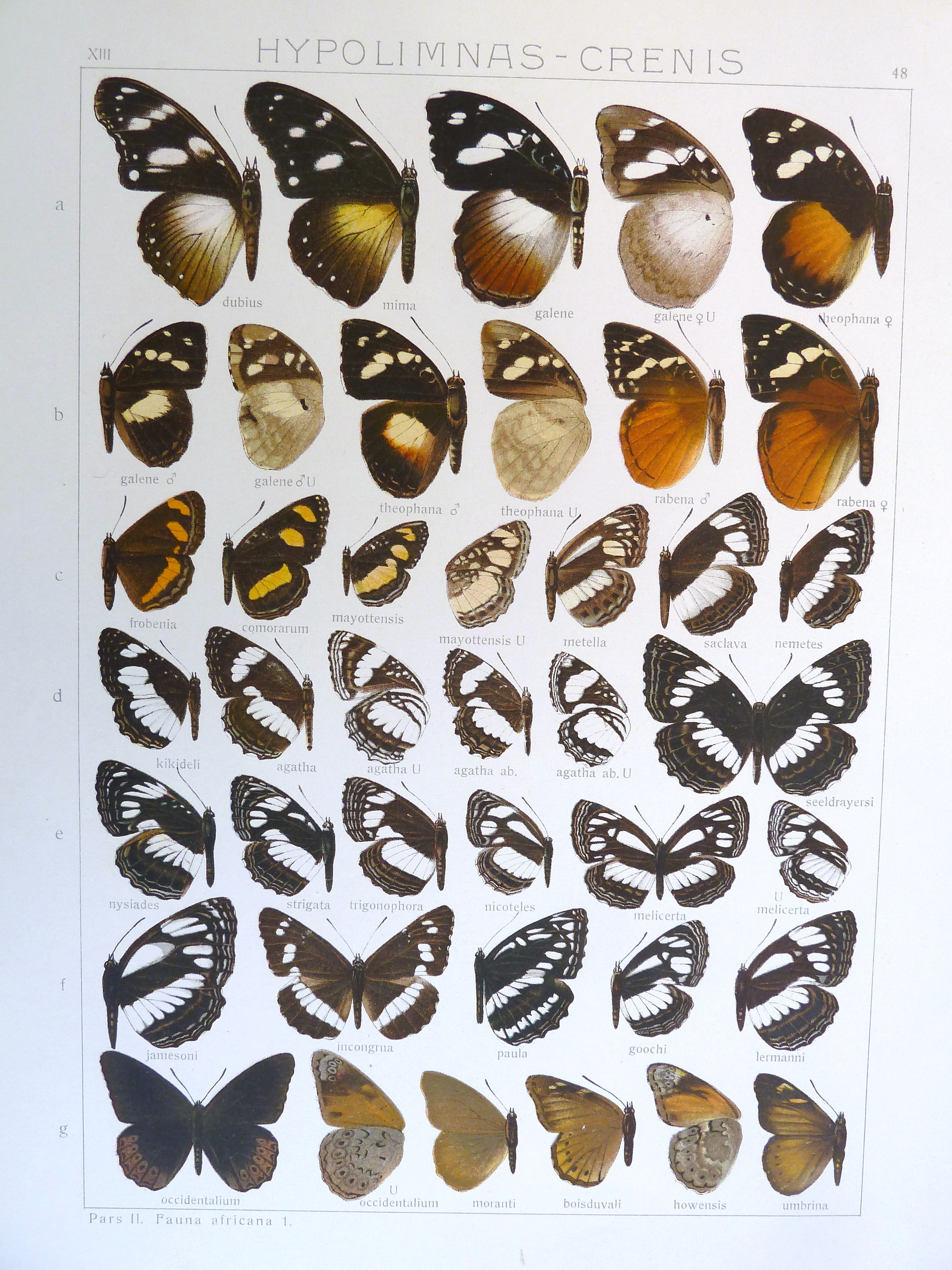
- In Adalbert Seitz's Fauna Africana

Scientific classification
- Domain: Eukaryota
- Kingdom: Animalia
- Phylum: Arthropoda
- Class: Insecta
- Order: Lepidoptera
- Family: Nymphalidae
- Genus: Sevenia
- Species: S. morantii

Binomial name
- Sevenia morantii (Trimen, 1881)

Synonyms
- Crenis morantii Trimen, 1881; Sallya morantii

= Sevenia morantii =

Morant's tree hymph

Species of butterfly

Sevenia morantii, the obscure tree nymph or Morant's tree nymph, is a butterfly in the family Nymphalidae found in southern Africa.

Wingspan: 40–45 mm in males and 43–50 mm in females. Flight period year round but mainly between December and May.

The larvae feed on Macaranga kilimandscharica, Excoecaria bussei and Sapium species (including S. ellipticum).
