= Johann Morant =

French ice hockey player

- Born: April 7, 1986 (age 38); Belfort, France
- Height: 5 ft 11 in (180 cm)
- Weight: 210 lb (95 kg; 15 st 0 lb)
- Position: Defence
- Shoots: Left
- NL team Former teams: Free Agent; HC La Chaux-de-Fonds; SC Bern; HC Lugano; Lausanne HC; EV Zug; ZSC Lions
- National team: France
- Playing career: 2003–present

Johann Morant (born April 7, 1986) is a former French professional ice hockey defenceman. He last played for the ZSC Lions in the National League (NL). He plays with a Swiss-player license and isn't considered an import player in the NL.
