= Criocephalosaurus =

Criocephalosaurus Temporal range: Guadalupian

Scientific classification
- Kingdom: Animalia
- Phylum: Chordata
- Clade: Synapsida
- Clade: Therapsida
- Suborder: †Dinocephalia
- Family: †Tapinocephalidae
- Subtribe: †Moschopina
- Genus: †Criocephalosaurus; Kammerer & Sidor, 2002

Species
- †C. gunyankaensis Boonstra, 1968; †C. vanderbyli Broom, 1928

Synonyms
- Criocephalus preoccupied

Extinct genus of therapsids

Criocephalosaurus (Greek for "ram head lizard") is an extinct genus of tapinocephalian therapsids that lived in Southern Africa during the Guadalupian epoch of the Permian. They are the latest surviving dinocephalians, extending past the Abrahamskraal Formation into the lowermost Poortjie Member of the Teekloof Formation in South Africa. They are also regarded as the most derived of the dinocephalians, alongside Tapinocephalus, and the most abundant in the fossil record.

== Discovery and naming ==
Criocephalus vanderbyli was the first discovered species of the genus and was named by Broom in 1928 following discovery of a weathered skull cap by W. Van der Byl at the Abrahamskraal Formation of the Karoo Basin in South Africa. The specimen found was a skull cap featuring the frontals, parietals, postfrontals, and one pre frontal.

Criocephalus gunyankaensis is the second named species of the genus and it was figured from four skull-caps described in 1968 by Boonstra. The four skull caps were discovered from the middle Madumabisa Mudstone Formation in the mid-Zambezi Basin of Zimbabwe.

The genus name was changed to Criocephalosaurus in 2002 as the name Criocephalus was found to be preoccupied by a beetle genus named in 1839. The genus name Criocephalosaurus was derived from the Greek words krios (ram), kephalos (head), and sauros (lizard).

== Description ==
Criocephalosaurus were large terrestrial herbivores, measuring 4–5 metres (13–16 ft) in length with a barrel-shaped body. They had short snouts and large thick skulls that were characteristic amongst tapinocephalids as well as specialized dentition for herbivory.

=== Skull ===
Criocephalosaurus had pronounced round pachyostosed skulls that were anteroventrally rotated and inclined backwards at the occiput. The braincase of these animals lies very far posteriorly and features well ossified sidewalls and dorsally closed fenestra between the otic and sphenoidal regions. However, the region between the sphenoidal bones and the nostril in Criocephalosaurus lack ossified sidewalls. The skull also features a very high and long dorsal septum in the vomers with a dorsal inclination. Another characteristic feature of Criocephalosaurus is a small interorbital region and orbits positioned more anteriorally on the skull in comparison to other tapinocephalids. Furthermore, the snouts of these basal therapsids were short, high, and quite broad.

The great pachyostosis found in this genus is thought to have caused the drastic widening of the inter-temporal region and a reduction in the temporal fossa so extreme that the fossa can't be viewed in a dorsal ortho-projection. The fossa is reduced to a short and wide slit in which the jaw adductors originate. The jaw adductors are found to originate specifically on the posterior flange of the postorbital, squamosal and parietal.

It has been suggested that Criocephalosaurus participated in agonistic behaviors such as head butting due to their unique cranial modifications. The well ossified frontoparietal head shield present in these therapsids is formed from lateral expansion of the parietal and an increase in supraorbital bone depth coupled with a lack of muscle attachment on the temporal roof. The increased dorsal contact surface and loss of soft tissues in the head region makes Criocephalosaurus well suited for head to head ramming.

=== Dentition ===
Although no teeth known to belong to Criocephalosaurus were recovered, the genus likely shared similar specialized herbivorous dentition common to the taxonomic group in which they belong, the tapinocephalids. Criocephalosaurus were polyphyodont homodonts with heel and talon tooth morphology and precise tooth-to-tooth occlusion. Interdigitation occurred throughout the entirety of the mouth, varying from the sole interdigitation of anterior teeth present in other tapinocephalians. The frequent and alternate replacement of teeth are necessary in herbivores such as Criocephalosaurus due to the harsh wear inflicted on the teeth surfaces from breaking down plant matter.

The teeth of Criocephalosaurus were specialized for herbivory with its thick dentine walls, wavy-like enamel caps, and a dentine exposed heel surface. Enamel thickness was variable between the long axis of the tooth as well as between labial and lingual surfaces of the heel. It's suggested that the differences in enamel thickness throughout the tooth are due to depositional differences rather than uneven wear.

Tooth development occurs with enamel and dentine deposition in a bell shaped formation within a crypt laying lingual to the tooth that later extends into the talon and heel. This differs from mammals in which the crown shape is molded first before tissue deposition.

There has also been evidence of a permanent gomphosis attachment style in tapinocephalids which may have similarly been present in Criocephalosaurus. Histology of tapinocephalid jaw and teeth specimens indicate presence of alveolar bone and cementum as well as a large periodontal ligament space where ligament attachment would've occurred, all of which suggest a permanent gomphosis attachment style as opposed to an anklyosis attachment. A gomphosis in Criocephalosaurus would've allowed for maintenance of tooth-to-tooth occlusion during the frequent and continuous teeth replacement.

== Histology ==
Histological analysis of dinocephalian bones has been conducted previously to reveal features common amongst dinocephalians. Criocephalosaurus was not directly investigated due to lack of appropriate specimens for analysis. However, results from closely related specimens such as Moschops and Struthiocephalus whaitsi may provide insight into the potential bone histology of Criocephalosaurus.

The bone cortex of Criocephalosaurus was likely composed primarily of fibrolamellar bone, indicating fast growth rates and osteogenesis. The thick cortex observed in herbivorous dionocephalians is formed from large and interconnected laminar vascular canals which are closely compacted in a concentric arrangement. Criocephalosaurus may have been characterized by a thick cortex and developed medullary spongiosa in similar fashion to Moschops and Keratocephalus.

== Classification ==
Criocephalosaurus belongs within the major therapsid clade Dinocephalia which can be split into two subclades, the carnivorous Anteosauria and herbivorous Tapinocephalia. Criocephalosaurus is found on the Tapinocephalia branch and more specifically, in the Tapinocephalidae family named by Boonstra in 1969. Tapinocephalidae are regarded as the most derived and also taxonomically diverse group of dinocephalians. The following cladogram is based on the most recent phylogenetic analysis of the relationships between tapinocephalid dinocephalia.

- 1
  - Biarmosuchia
  - 2
    - 3
      Archaeosyodon
    - - Deuterosaurus
      - 4
        - Jonkeria
        - 5
          - Tapinocaninus
          - - Ulemosaurus
            - - Riebeeckosaurus
              - - - Criocephalosaurus
                  - Moschops
                - - Tapinocephalus

1 Therapsida, 2 Dinocephalia, 3 Anteosauridae, 4 Tapinocephalia, 5 Tapinocephalidae

== Stratigraphic and geographic range ==
Criocephalosaurus is primarily known from the Tapinocephalus Assemblage Zone (TAZ) which constitutes the middle of the Abrahamskraal Formation of the South African Beaufort Group. Day and Rubidge proposed a division of the Tapinocephalus AZ into two subzones in 2020 based on the faunal difference in the upper and lower parts of the assemblage zone.

Criocephalosaurus vanderbyli is included within the proposed Diictodon-Styracocephalus subzone which lies above the Eosimops-Glanosuchus subzone and constitutes the upper boundary of the TAZ.

Criocephalosaurus gunyankaensis is known from the middle Madumabisa Mudstone Formation in the mid-Zambezi Basin of Zimbabwe which is associated with the Tapinocephalus AZ in South Africa. C. gunyankaensis is the only Criocephalosaurus species found in Zimbabwe.

Day et al. reported discovery of two new Criocephalosaurus partial skull specimens in 2015 within the lowermost Poortjie Member of the Teekloof Formation which lies above the Abrahamskraal Formation. Dinocephalians are thought to have gone extinct in the upper Abrahamskraal Formation, making the two specimens the youngest dinocephalians in the fossil record. The specimen SAM-PK-K10888 was discovered by J.A and Madelon Tusenius and the second specimen BP/1/7214 was discovered by M.D. and Christen Shelton.

Criocephalosaurus likely went extinct alongside other dinocephalian therapsids in the late-Guadalupian mass extinction event that occurred in the late Paleozoic. The late Guadalupian or Capitanian mass extinction eradicated dinocephalian therapsids during the primary phase of extinction.
