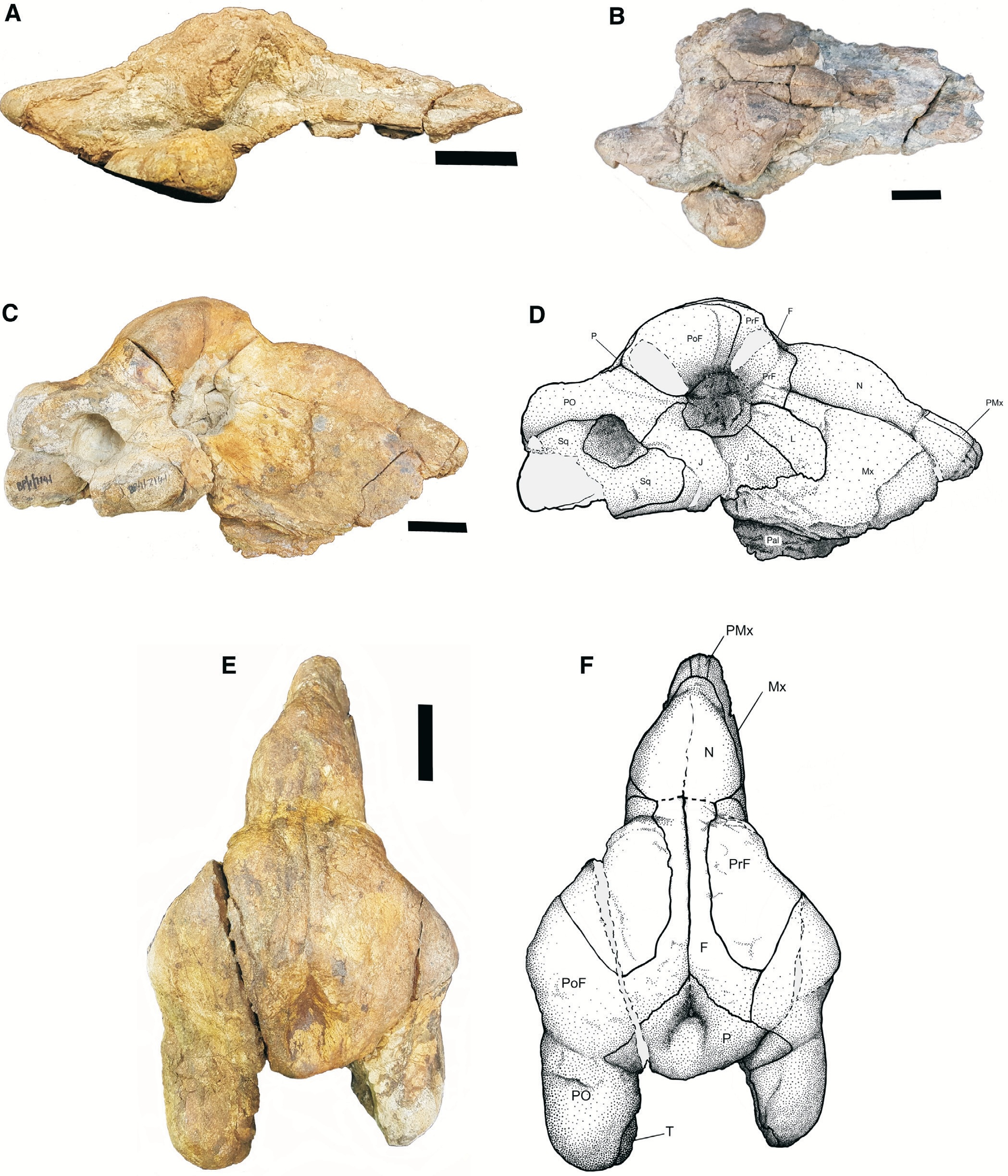
- Skull of the holotype specimen SAM-PK-8936 (A and B) as well as BP/1/7141 (C, D, E and F)

Scientific classification
- Kingdom: Animalia
- Phylum: Chordata
- Clade: Synapsida
- Clade: Therapsida
- Suborder: †Dinocephalia
- Family: †Styracocephalidae; Haughton & Brink, 1954
- Genus: †Styracocephalus; Haughton, 1929
- Species: †S. platyrhynchus

Binomial name
- †Styracocephalus platyrhynchus Haughton, 1929

= Styracocephalus =

Styracocephalus Temporal range: Capitanian, 265.8–260.4 Ma

Extinct genus of therapsids

Styracocephalus (Greek for "spiked-head") is an extinct genus of dinocephalian therapsid known from the late Middle Permian (Capitanian) Tapinocephalus Assemblage Zone of South Africa. It has a single species, Styracocephalus platyrhynchus. It is the only member of the family Styracocephalidae. The species is primarily known from skulls, which have distinctive large backward-protruding horns and other thickened bones.

== History of discovery ==
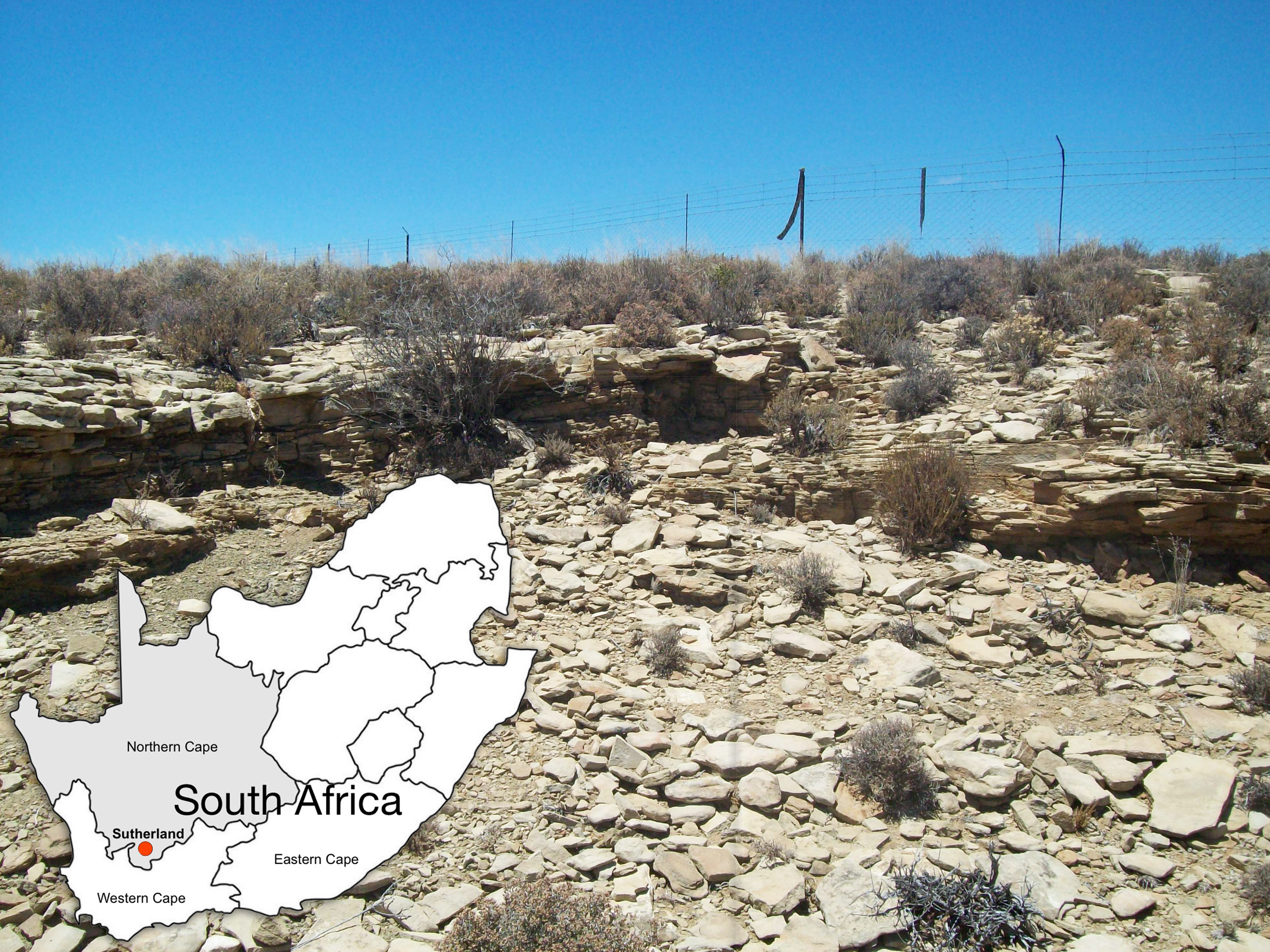
Photograph showing the Tontelbosch locality where the BP/1/7141 skull was found, with a map of South Africa inset

The first Styracocephalus fossil was discovered by Lieuwe Dirk Boonstra in 1928 from a farm called Boesmansrivier, near Beaufort West in the Western Cape, and described in a scientific paper a year later by Sidney H. Haughton. This specimen, comprising a skull, catalogued as SAM-PK-8936, while largely complete, is heavily crushed, making its anatomy difficult to interpret. Later specimens attributed to the species were not reported until 1959, and additional specimens were reported and described in the 1990s. In 2019, a largely complete and mostly undistorted skull (BP/1/7141) of the species was reported, allowing for its anatomy to be properly characterised for the first time. Later in 2023, some specimens historically attributed to Styracocephalus have been recognised as not belonging to the genus, and representing burnetiamorphs instead.

== Description ==
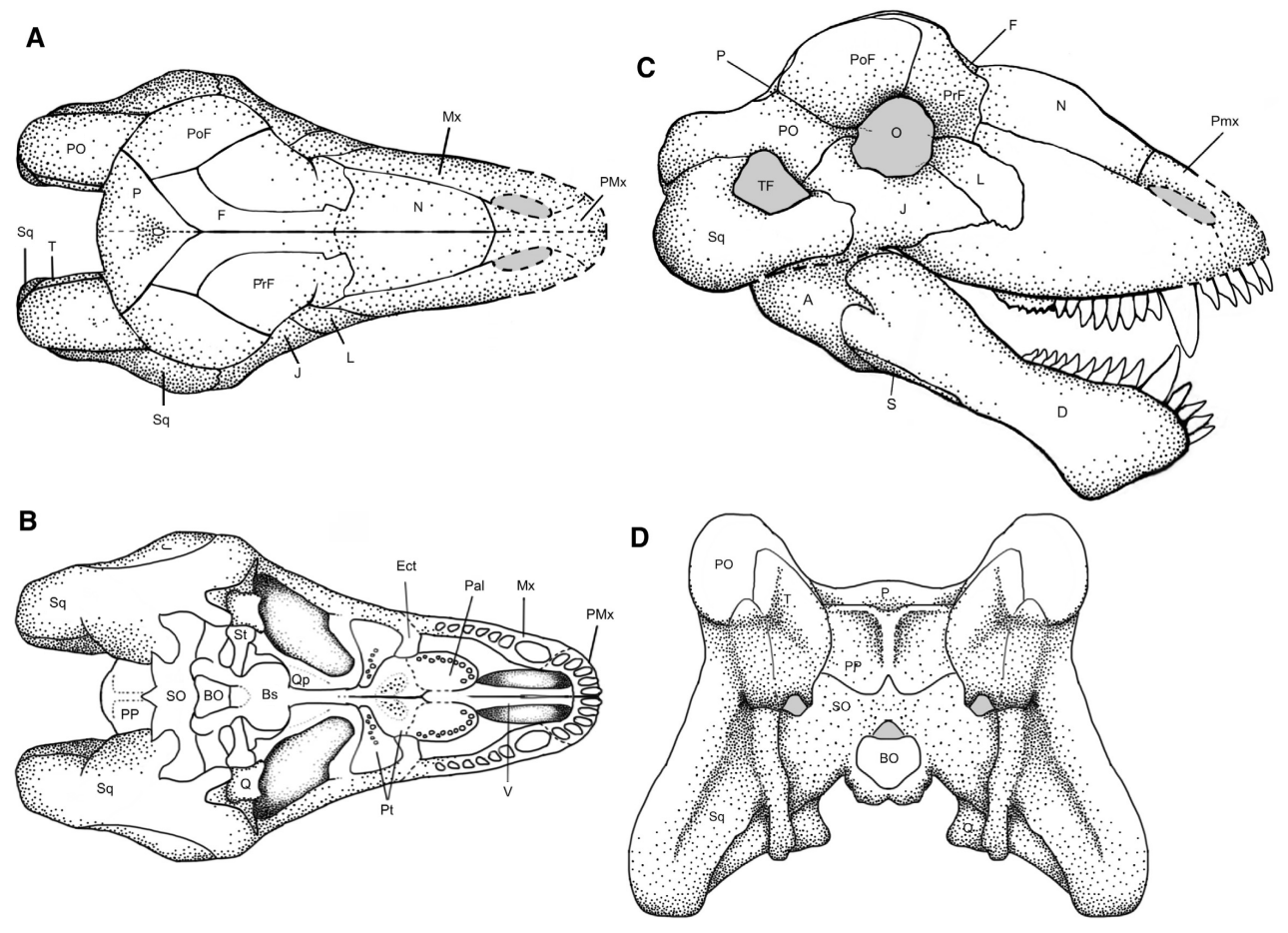
Skull diagram in top down (A) from below (B) side on (C) and from the back (D) views

The skull of Styracocephalus is relatively elongate, with the BP/1/7141 skull being approximately 37.6 centimetres (14.8 in) long. Many of the skull bones exhibit pachyostosis (thickening), as is found in other dinocephalians. A prominent feature of the skull are large posteriorly directed "horns" formed primarily by the pronounced posterior enlargement of the postorbital bones on the top side of the skull, as well as of the squamosal on the underside of the skull and the tabular on the inward facing (medial) side). The squamosal bones are also thickened towards the front of the bone on the underside of the temporal fenestra. The nasal bones also bear substantial thickening (boss). The frontal bone does not form part of the border of the orbit (eye socket). The paired parietal bones on the skull roof bear a small pineal foramen, like other dinocephalians. On the underside of the skull, the paired pterygoid bones are triangular and plate-like bearing at least 17 teeth on the main body and four on the flange (part of the palatal dentition on the roof of the mouth). Palatal teeth are also present on the palatine bones.

Styracocephalus has moderately sized canines. The incisor and postcanine teeth, as is typical of dinocephalians, have a "talon and heel" morphology, thought this is weakly pronounced in Styracocephalus in comparison to other dinocephalians. There are typically around eight to ten post-canines. The dentary forms about 75% of the lower jaw when viewed from the outer (lateral) face, though significantly less when viewed from the inner (medial) face.

== Paleobiology ==
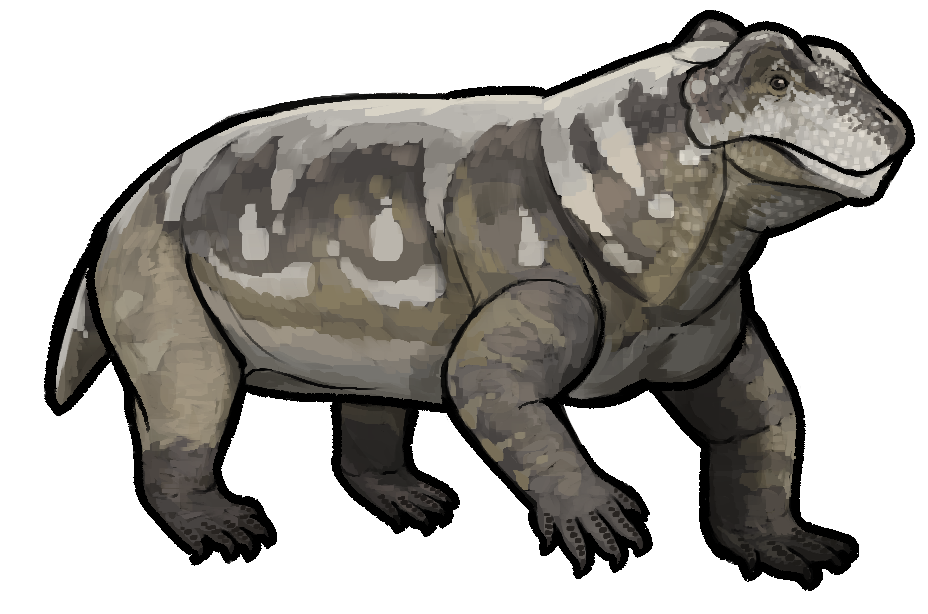
Restoration

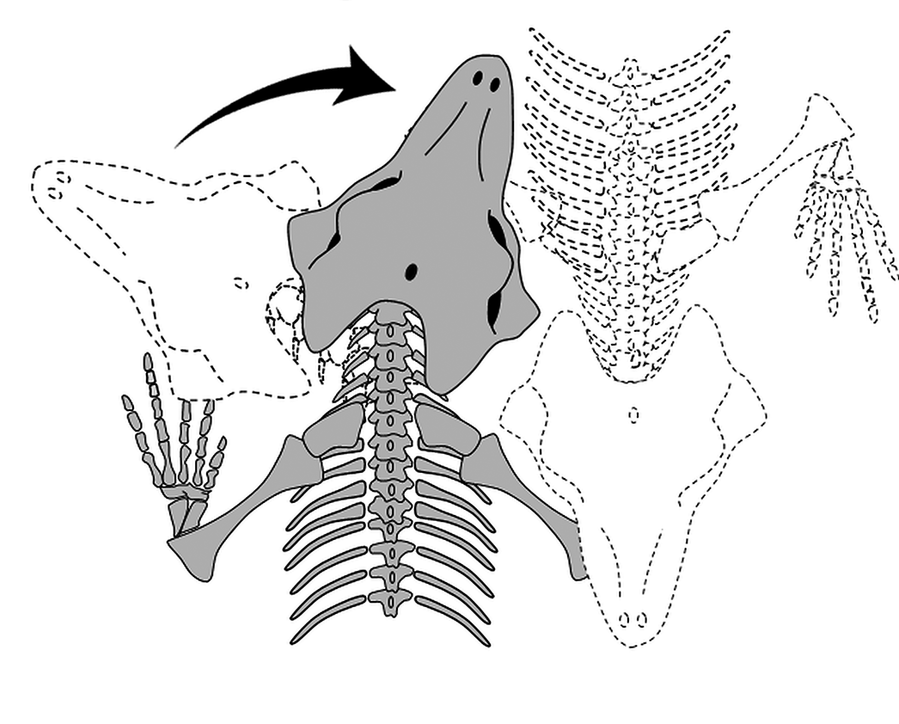
Diagram of proposed "flank butting" combat behaviour between Styracocephalus individuals

Styracocephalus is inferred to have been herbivorous. The ornamented cranium of Styracocephalus has been proposed to have been used for combat against rivals of the same species, specifically "flank butting", similar to modern giraffes, where the head is swung side-to-side against the body of the opponent.

== Paleoecology ==
Fossils of Styracocephalus are found in the Tapinocephalus Assemblage Zone of the South African Karoo. which a 2022 study dated as lasting from around 264.4 to 260 million years ago, during the Capitanian stage of the Middle Permian (Guadalupian). At this time, South Africa was located in the southern part of the supercontinent Pangaea, adjacent to what is now South America and Antarctica. The Tapinocephalus Assemblage Zone, like other assemblage zones within the Abrahamskraal Formation, is thought to have been deposited in a semi-arid environment with strong seasonal variation in rainfall, with the landscape being crossed with rivers and their heavily vegetated ﬂoodplains. Episodes of heavy rainfall are likely to have resulted in flooding episodes. Dinocephalians form a prominent component of the local fauna during this period, including herbivorous tapinocephalids like the titular Tapinocephalus, Moschops, Criocephalosaurus, herbivorous or omnivorous titanosuchians like Titanosuchus and Jonkeria, and the large predatory anteosaur Anteosaurus. Other therapsids present include predatory biarmosuchians, gorgonopsids and therocephalians, and herbivorous anomodonts including dicynodonts. Other large animals include herbivorous pareiasaurian reptiles like Bradysaurus. The ecosystem of the Tapinocephalus Assemblage Zone was disrupted by the end-Capitanian mass extinction event, which caused all dinocephalians to become extinct.

== Classification ==
Styracocephalus was regarded as so distinctive that when it was described in 1929, it was attributed by its describer to the new suborder Styracocephalia. Later authors generally favoured a placement in Burnetiamorpha (part of Biarmosuchia) or Dinocephalia. However, detailed analysis shows that Styracocephalus is a dinocephalian, and lacks key anatomical traits of biarmosuchians. Styracocephalus is currently classified as the only member of the family Styracocephalidae within the largely herbivorous Tapinocephalia, one of the two main subdivisions of Dinocephalia. Below is a cladogram depicting the relationship of the Styracocephalidae with other dinocephalians based on a phylogenetic study published in 2019.

- Dinocephalia
  - Anteosauria
  - Tapinocephalia
    - Estemmenosuchidae
      Estemmenosuchus
    - - Styracocephalidae
        Styracocephalus
      - - Titanosuchidae
          Jonkeria
        - Tapinocephalidae
          - Tapinocaninus
          - - Ulemosaurus
            - Moschops

== See also ==
- List of therapsids
