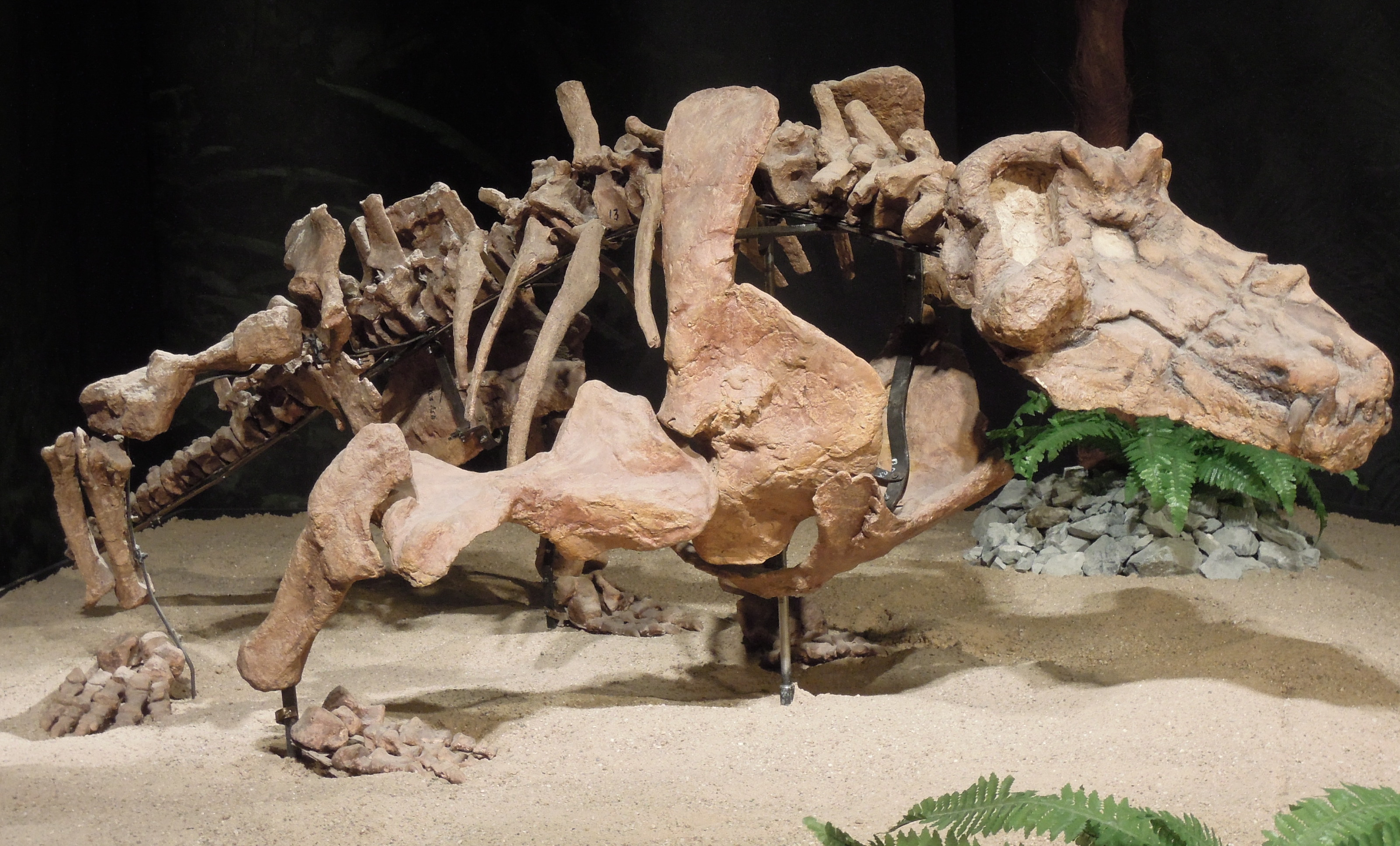
- E. uralensis skeleton

Scientific classification
- Kingdom: Animalia
- Phylum: Chordata
- Clade: Synapsida
- Clade: Therapsida
- Suborder: †Dinocephalia
- Family: †Estemmenosuchidae; Tchudinov, 1960
- Genus: †Estemmenosuchus; Tchudinov, 1960

Species
- †E. uralensis Tchudinov, 1960 (type); †E. mirabilis Tchudinov, 1968

Synonyms
- Anoplosuchus tenuirostris Tchudinov, 1968; Zopherosuchus luceus Tchudinov, 1963

= Estemmenosuchus =

Estemmenosuchus Temporal range: Guadalupian (Wordian), 267 Ma

Extinct genus of therapsids

Estemmenosuchus (meaning "crowned crocodile" in Greek) is an extinct genus of large herbivorous dinocephalian therapsid. It lived during the Middle Permian around 267 million years ago. The two species, E. uralensis and E. mirabilis, are characterised by distinctive horn-like structures, which were probably used for intra-specific display and/or combat. Both species of Estemmenosuchus are from the Perm (or Cis-Urals) region of Russia. It is currently the only recognised genus in the family Estemmenosuchidae. Two other estemmenosuchids, Anoplosuchus and Zopherosuchus, are now considered females of the species E. uralensis. There were many complete and incomplete skeletons found together.

== Description ==
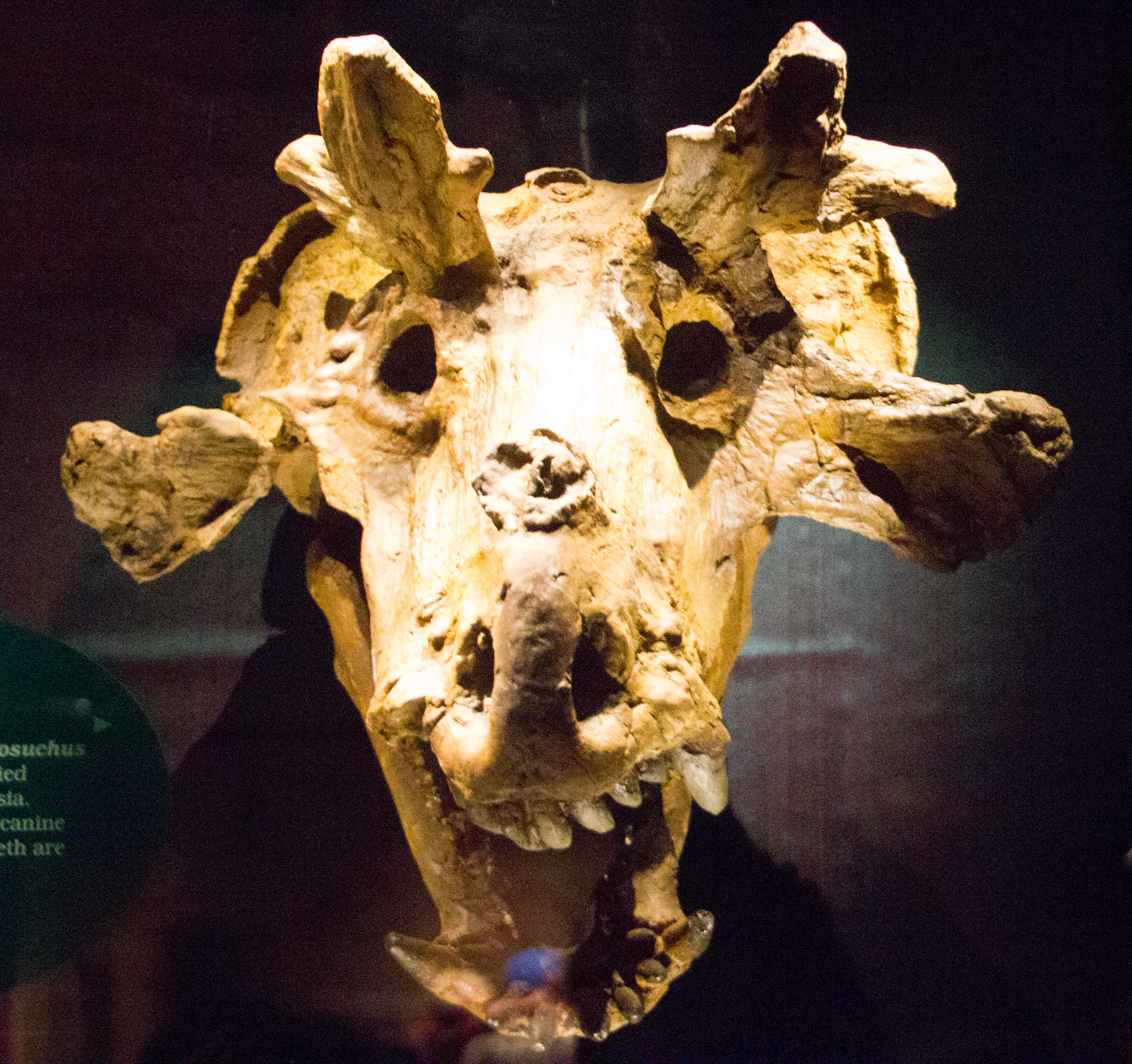
Skull of E. mirabilis

Estemmenosuchus could reach a body length of more than 3 m (10 ft). Its skull was long and massive, up to 65 cm (26 in) in length. The temporal fenestrae are relatively large. There are a distinct set of horn like-growths formed by the frontal, postfrontal and probably the postorbitals, as well as another large growth on the lower part of the jugal bone. There are 5 pairs of incisors, one pair of canines, and 20 pairs of postcanine teeth in the upper jaw, and four pairs of incisors, one pair of canines, and 20-24 pairs of postcanine teeth in the lower jaw. The canine teeth are relatively short and thick relative to other dinocephalians. The postcanine teeth are relatively small, with the crown being swollen and the apex of the postcanine teeth being narrow and serrated.^{12} Like other dinocephalians, the incisor teeth are intermeshing. Estemmenosuchus is the only known therapsid to possess palatal teeth (teeth on the roof of the mouth) on the vomer bone, with palatal teeth also present on the pterygoid and palatine bones like other therapsids. Estemmenosuchus may also have had osteoderms (bony growths) embedded in its skin.

Estemmenosuchus is well known for being one of the few non-mammalian therapsids (alongside the dicynodont Lystrosaurus) to have preserved skin impressions. The skin appears to be scaleless, possibly preserving the remnants of melanin pigment, and covered in numerous small spherical tubercles around 0.3–0.45 millimetres (3/256–9/512 in) across, which may represent glands.

== Taxonomy ==
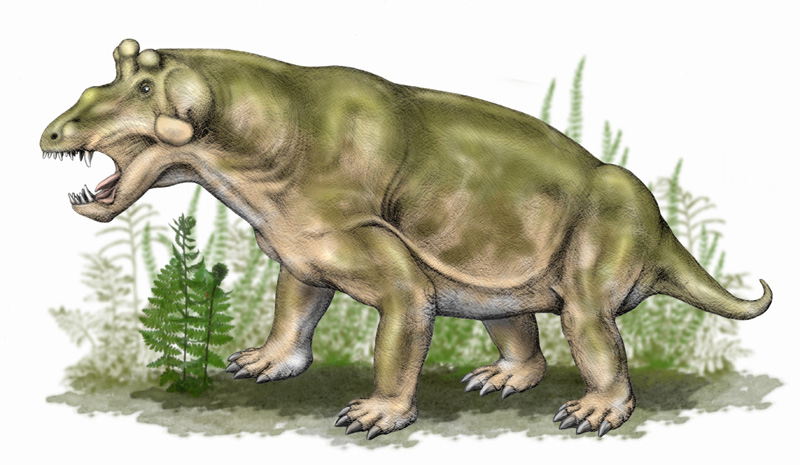
Life restoration of E. uralensis

Estemmenosuchus is interpreted to have lived some 267 million years ago. Two species have been identified, from the Ocher Assemblage Zone Belebei Formation at the Ezhovo locality near Ochyor in the Perm region of the Russia in 1960. They were found with the biarmosuchians Eotitanosuchus olsoni and Biarmosuchus tener in channel flood deposits of the young Ural Mountains. They differ in size, shape of the skull, and shape of the horns.

Originally all specimens were included in Estemmenosuchus uralensis, but it was since realised that there were a number of different species. However, not all palaeontologists agree that these were different species. According to Ivakhnenko (1998) Anoplosuchus and Zopherosuchus are synonyms of Estemmenosuchus uralensis.

Species	Status	Abundance	Remains	Skull length	Body Length	Notes	Images
Anoplosuchus tenuirostris	Synonym of Estemmenosuchus uralensis	Fairly uncommon	Incomplete skeleton and skull		Intermediate in size	There are no horns or thickening, except in the front nasal region.	
Estemmenosuchus mirabilis	Valid species	Fairly uncommon	Skull, lower jaw and vertebrae	Up to 42 cm long	3 m long	Unlike E. uralensis, which had only one horn on each side of its head, this species had 2 projecting bony knobs on each side of the cranium, one on the top pointing up looking like antlers and another pointing to the side similar to E. uralensis. Its snout is smaller and wider than its relative and looks vaguely like a modern moose. The palate teeth include six incisors, two canines and about twenty small incisor-like teeth at the rear. The lower palate contained six incisors, two canines and about thirty smaller back teeth.	
Estemmenosuchus uralensis	Valid species	Common	Elements of skulls and postcrania	Up to 68 cm long	4.5 m long	The species are characterised by horns which project upward and outward on the side of the head. The mouth contained large canines with small molar teeth.	
Zopherosuchus luceus	Synonym of Estemmenosuchus uralensis	Fairly uncommon	Poorly preserved skeleton and incomplete skull		1.5 m long	Some of bones at the front of the skull are particularly thickened.	

Estemmenoschus is currently classified as the only genus in the family Estemmenosuchidae.

The taxonomic position of Estememnosuchus has historically been debated. Hopson and Barghusen in 1986, who provided the first cladistic study of the Therapsida, coined the term Tapinocephalia for herbivorous dinocephalians, as opposed to the "Anteosauria" for the carnivorous forms. They suggested that Estemmenosuchids are very early/primitive members of the Tapinocephalia. However Thomas Kemp (1982) and Gillian King (1988) argue instead that the Estemmenosuchidae are the most basal Dinocephalia, being more primitive than both the Anteosauria and the Tapinocephalia.

Estemmenosuchus is currently classified as one of the most basal members of the largely herbivorous Tapinocephalia, one of the two main subdivisions of Dinocephalia. Below is a cladogram depicting the relationship of the Estemmenosuchus with other dinocephalians based on a phylogenetic study published in 2019.

- Dinocephalia
  - Anteosauria
  - Tapinocephalia
    - Estemmenosuchidae
      Estemmenosuchus
    - - Styracocephalidae
        Styracocephalus
      - - Titanosuchidae
          Jonkeria
        - Tapinocephalidae
          - Tapinocaninus
          - - Ulemosaurus
            - Moschops

== Paleobiology ==
Estemmenosuchus has been inferred to be herbivorous.

=== Thermoregulation ===
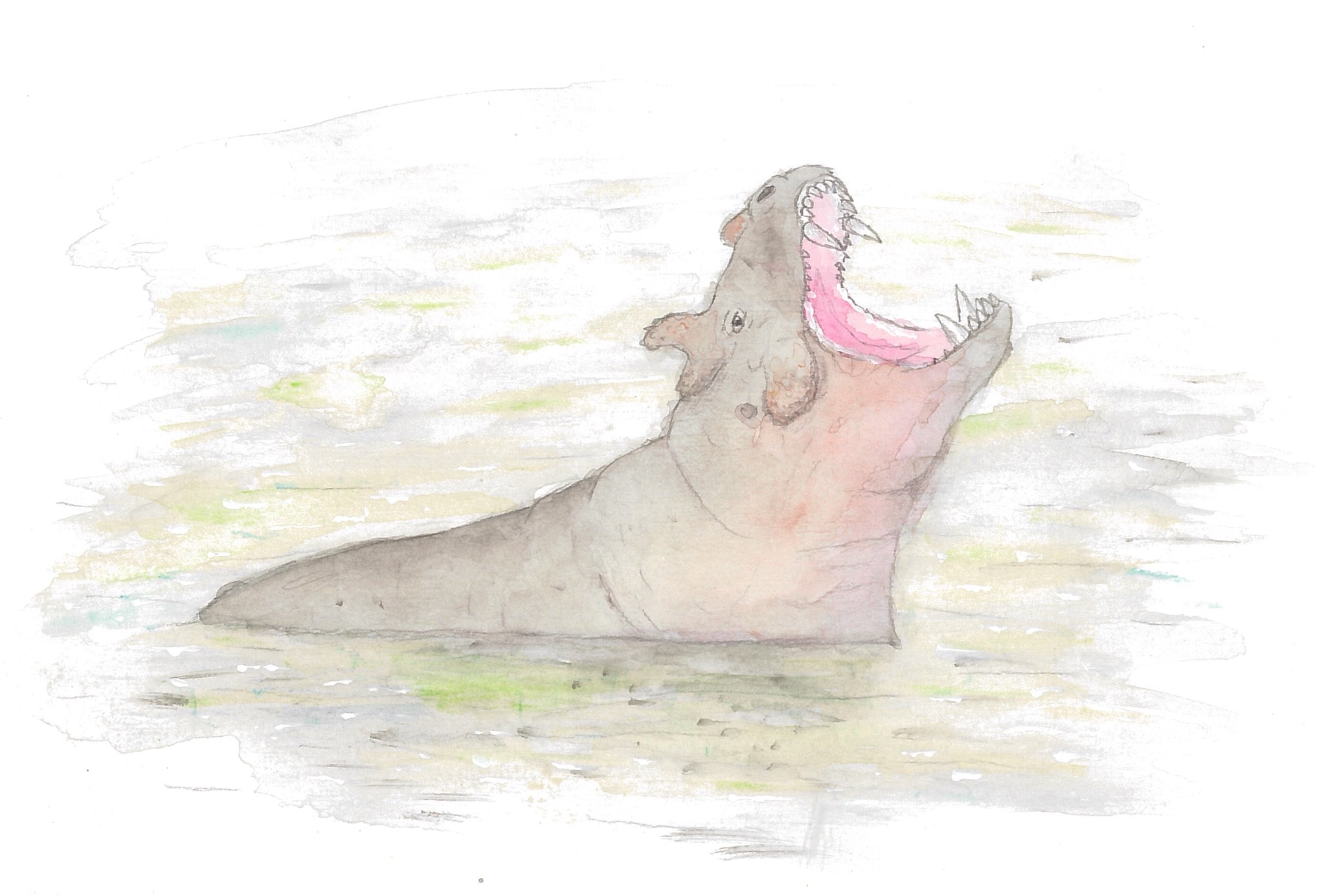
A painting of an Estemmenosuchus wallowing in a lake

It has been suggested that the animal had a fairly constant internal temperature. Its large size and compact build gave a small surface-to-volume ratio and suggests it would not gain (or lose) temperature quickly. This phenomenon is called gigantothermy and was probably an important factor in temperature regulation in most therapsids.

=== Function of horns ===
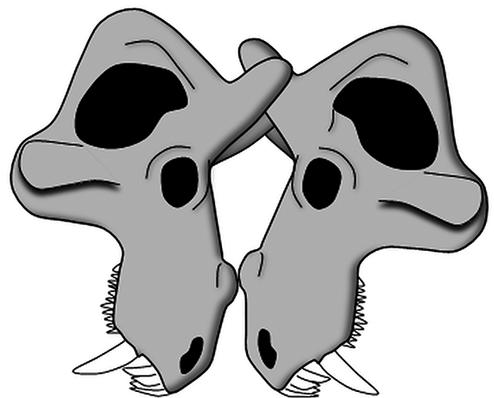
Proposed combat pose between rival Estemmenosuchus individuals

Species of Estemmenosuchus may have engaged in fighting behaviour against rival individuals of the same species using their head ornamentation, as has been suggested for other dinocephalians. The complex head ornamentation of Estemmenosuchus in particular may have served for lock and pushing combat, functioning similar to antlers in living deer species, as its skull is less adapted for heavy blows than other dinocephalians. Like modern ungulates, their head ornamentation may have also served for display alongside combat.
