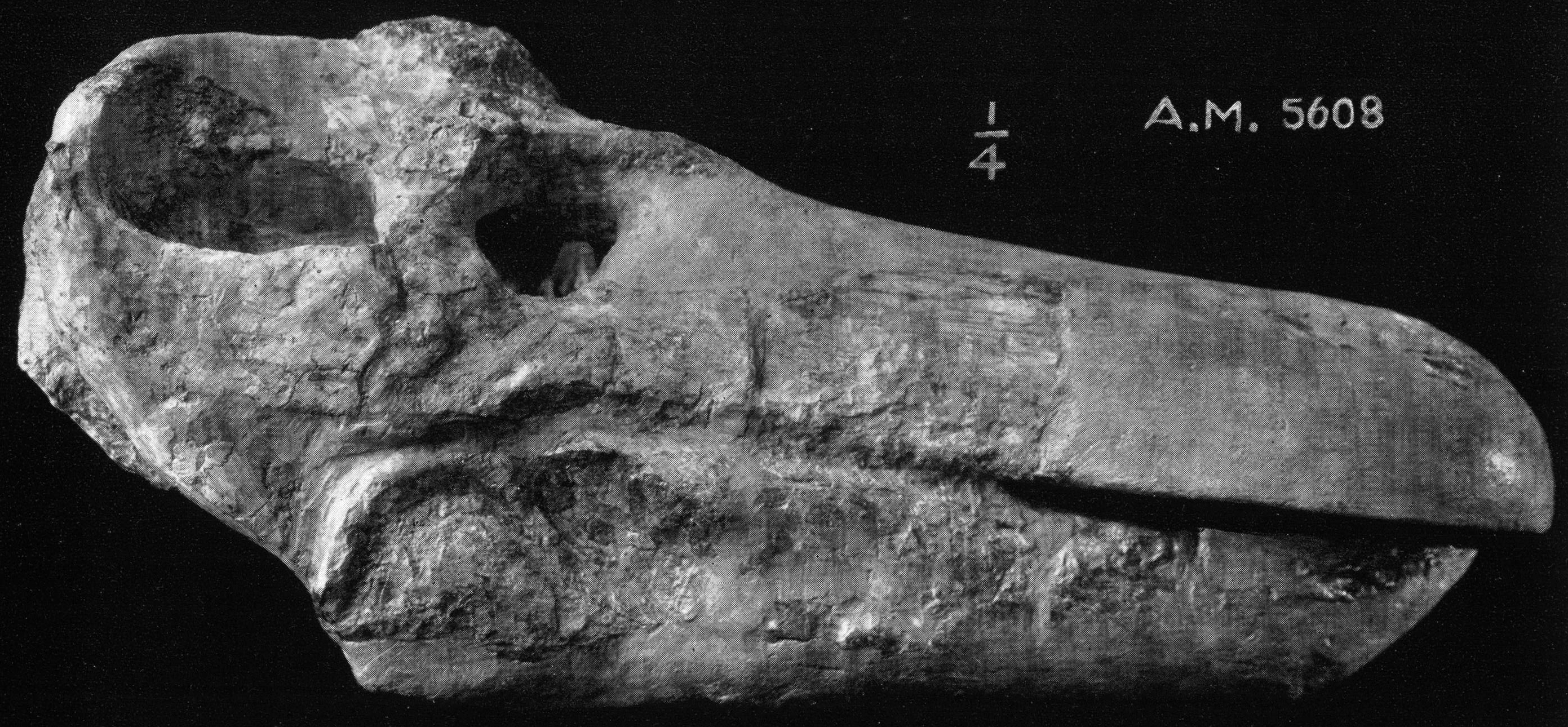
- Jonkeria truculenta skull, Amer. Mus. No. 5608 (holotype of J. ingens)

Scientific classification
- Kingdom: Animalia
- Phylum: Chordata
- Clade: Synapsida
- Clade: Therapsida
- Suborder: †Dinocephalia
- Family: †Titanosuchidae
- Genus: †Jonkeria; Van Hoepen, 1916
- Species: †J. truculenta

Binomial name
- †Jonkeria truculenta Van Hoepen, 1916

Synonyms
- Genus synonymy: Dinophoneus Broom, 1923; Dinosphageus Broom, 1929; Phoneosuchus Broom, 1929; Species synonymy: Dinophoneus ingens Broom, 1923; Dinosphageus haughtoni Broom, 1929; Jonkeria crassus Broom, 1929; Jonkeria pugnax Broom, 1929; Jonkeria vanderblyi Broom, 1929; Phoneosuchus angusticeps Broom, 1929; Jonkeria ingens Boonstra, 1935; Jonkeria angusticeps Boonstra, 1953; Jonkeria haughtoni Boonstra, 1953; Jonkeria parva Boonstra, 1955; Jonkeria rossouwi Boonstra, 1955; Jonkeria boonstraii Janensch, 1959

= Jonkeria =

Jonkeria Temporal range: Capitanian, 265–260 Ma

Extinct genus of therapsids

Jonkeria is an extinct genus of large herbivorous or omnivorous dinocephalian therapsid, from the Tapinocephalus Assemblage Zone, Lower Beaufort Group, of the South African Karoo.

== Discovery ==
The holotype specimen, TM 212, was collected in 1916 from the Abrahamskraal farm in the Prince Albert Local Municipality in South Africa. It is currently located in the Ditsong National Museum of Natural History. All specimens have been recovered from the Abrahamskraal Formation and the lowest portion of the Teekloof Formation, corresponding to the Tapinocephalus Assemblage Zone.

== Description ==
Diagram of skull bones

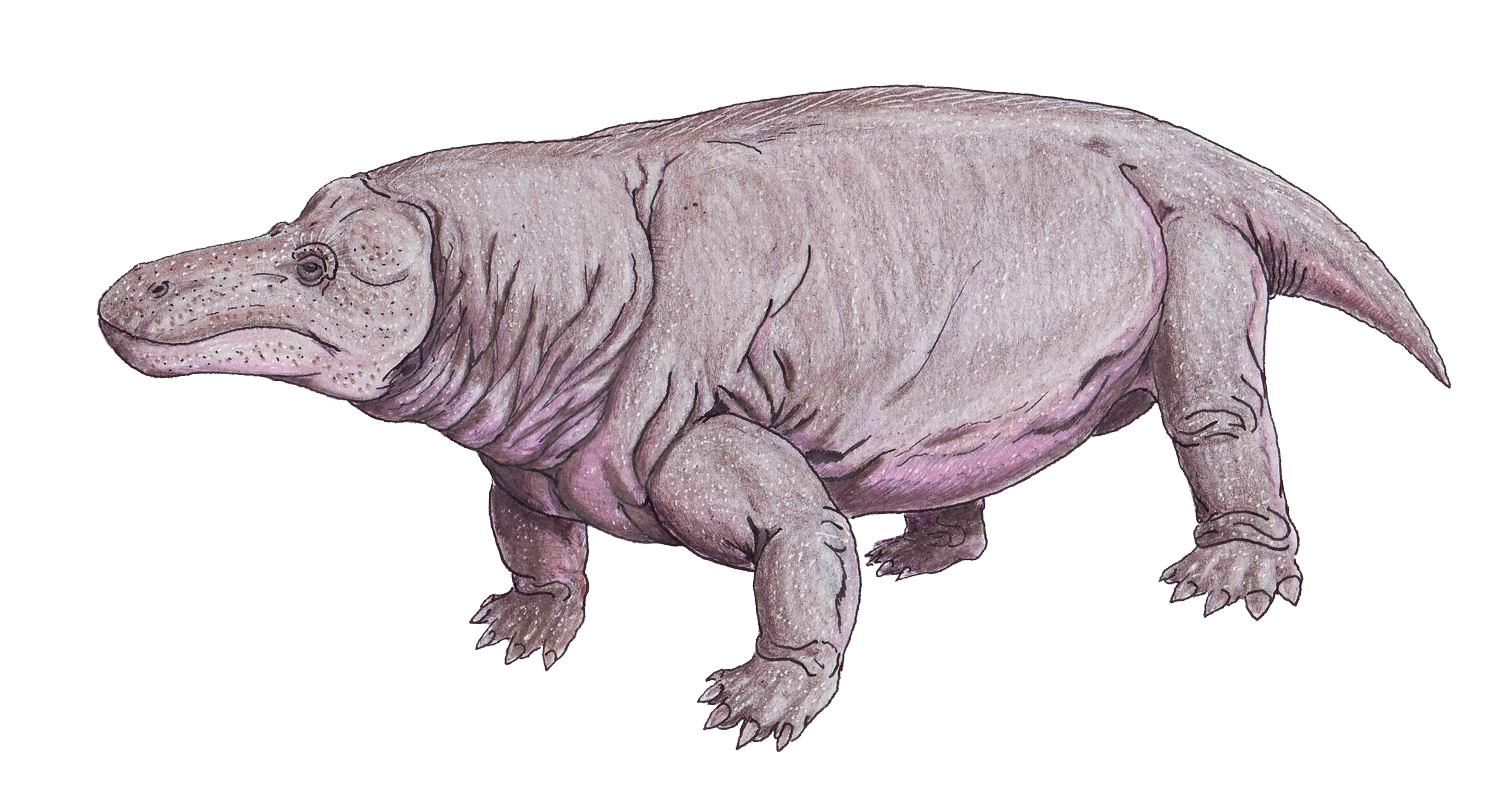
Life restoration of Jonkeria

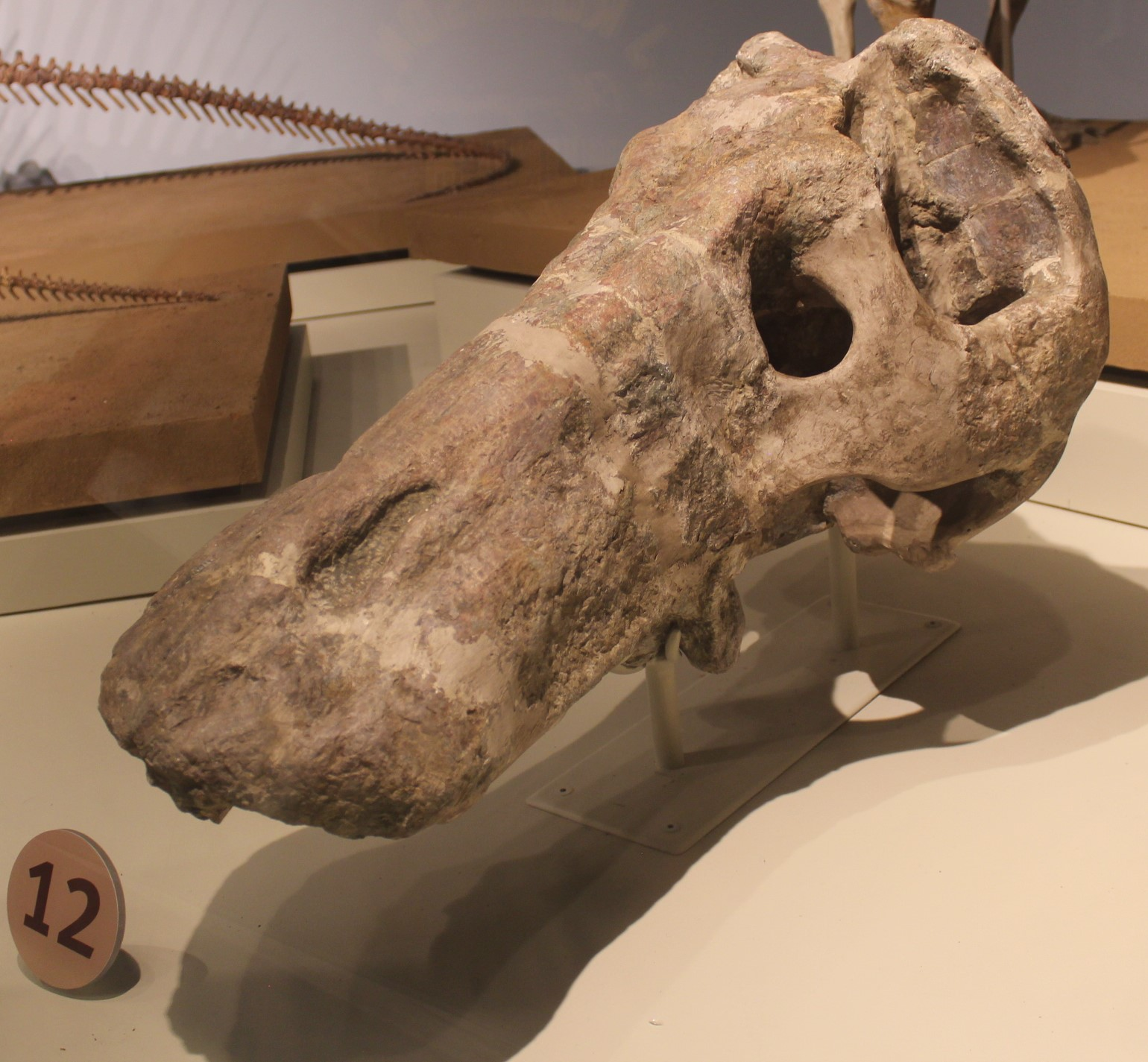
Skull of Jonkeria truculenta in the Field Museum of Natural History, Chicago

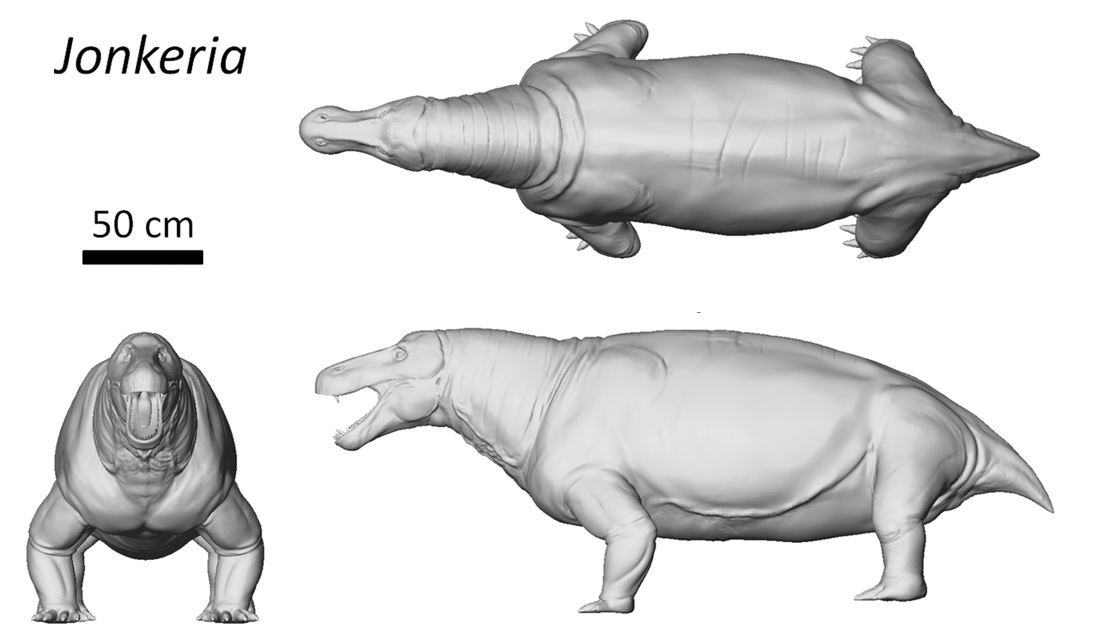
3D model of Jonkeria in various views

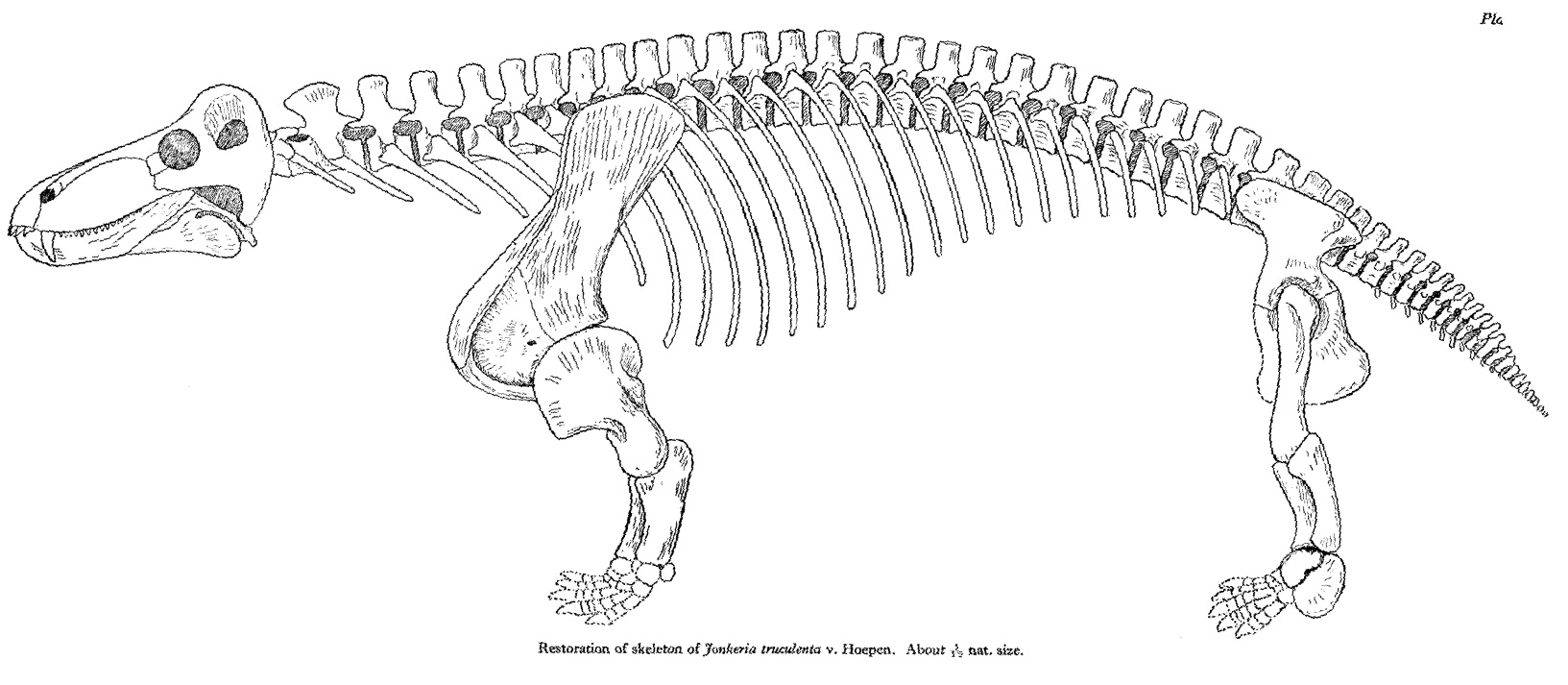
Historic skeletal reconstruction from 1929

Size comparison of a large specimen of Jonkeria compared to a human

The overall length was 3.5 m (11 ft 6 in) or more (up to 4 or 5 m (13 ft 1 in or 16 ft 5 in)), the skull about 55 cm (22 in) long. About 22% of the endocast volume of Jonkeria was filled by non-neural tissue. One specimen has been estimated based on volumetric analysis of a sculpted 3D model to have weighed 989 kg (2,180 lb), making one of the largest known non-mammalian therapsids. The skull is nearly twice as long as wide, and the snout is elongated and provided with sharp incisors and large canines. The cheek teeth were small. The body is robustly built, and the limbs stout. Jonkeria cannot be distinguished from its relative Titanosuchus on characters of the skull (all known skulls of Titanosuchus are poorly preserved), but only in limb length, Jonkeria having short and squat limbs and Titanosuchus long ones.

The limb and rib bones of Jonkeria display thickened bone walls and infilling of the medullary cavity with bone tissue. This is similar to the bone structure of the modern hippopotamus and the extinct aquatic reptile Claudiosaurus, and, which may suggest that, like them, Jonkeria was semiaquatic. The long rostrum of Jonkeria was well-innervated and sensitive, possibly to detect changes in pressure underwater. Young Jonkeria individuals grew rapidly, similarly to endothermic animals, whereas adults experienced cyclical growth rates.

Evidence of femoral osteomyelitis has been described in a fossilised specimen of Jonkeria. The authors attributed the cause of the pathology, characterised by bony spicules growing perpendicular to nonpathological fibrolamellar bone tissue, to a bacterial infection resulting from an attack by a predator, as evidenced by puncture marks on the femur.

== Classification ==
About a dozen species have been named, including the type species, J. truculenta. At least some of the other species were synonymised by Boonstra 1969, and most of the remaining species were synonymized into J. truculenta in 2024, with some being determined to be nomina dubia Titanosuchidae indet.

The cladogram below depicts the results of a phylogenetic analysis of a selection of dinocephalians representing the various recognised subgroups, including Jonkeria, performed by Fraser-King et al. (2019). Under their results and systematic terminology, Jonkeria was found to be a tapinocephalian closer to tapinocephalids than are Styracocephalus and Estemmenosuchus. The cladogram below is simplified from their full analysis, focused only on the relationships of dinocephalians.

- Dinocephalia
  - Anteosauria
    - Sinophoneus
    - - Titanophoneus
      - Syodon
  - Tapinocephalia
    - Estemmenosuchus
    - - Styracocephalus
      - - Jonkeria
        - Tapinocephalidae
          - Tapinocaninus
          - - Ulemosaurus
            - Moschops

== See also ==
- List of therapsids
