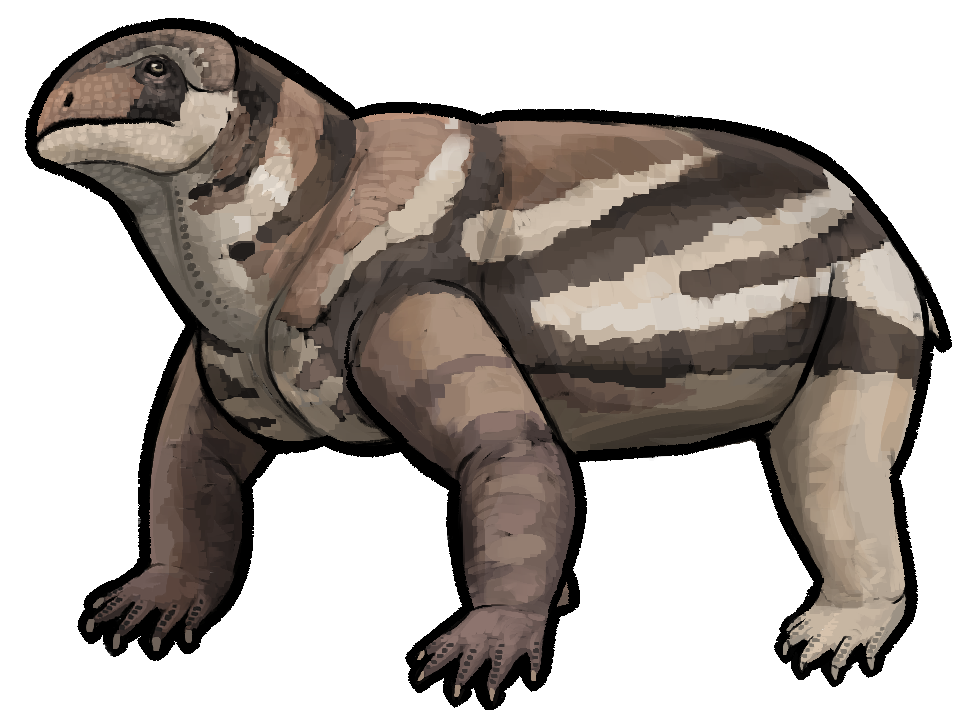

Scientific classification
- Kingdom: Animalia
- Phylum: Chordata
- Clade: Synapsida
- Clade: Therapsida
- Suborder: †Dinocephalia
- Family: †Tapinocephalidae
- Tribe: †Riebeeckosaurini
- Genus: †Riebeeckosaurus; Boonstra, 1952
- Species: †R. longirostris

Binomial name
- †Riebeeckosaurus longirostris Boonstra, 1952

Synonyms
- Genus synonymy: Avenantia Boonstra, 1952; Species synonymy: Avenantia kruisvleiensis Boonstra, 1952

= Riebeeckosaurus =

Riebeeckosaurus Temporal range: Capitanian

Extinct genus of therapsids

Riebeeckosaurus is an extinct genus of tapinocephalian therapsids from the Guadalupian epoch of Tapinocephalus Assemblage Zone, lower Beaufort Beds of the Karoo, in South Africa. Only two skulls are known from the type genus.

It was a herbivorous, medium-sized (2.5 metres (8 ft 2 in) in length, 500 kilograms (1,100 lb) in mass) dinocephalian It had a relatively short snout.

In 2013, Saniye Güven and colleagues proposed that the genus Avenantia is synonymous with Riebeeckosaurus, representing an immature individual.

== See also ==
- List of therapsids
