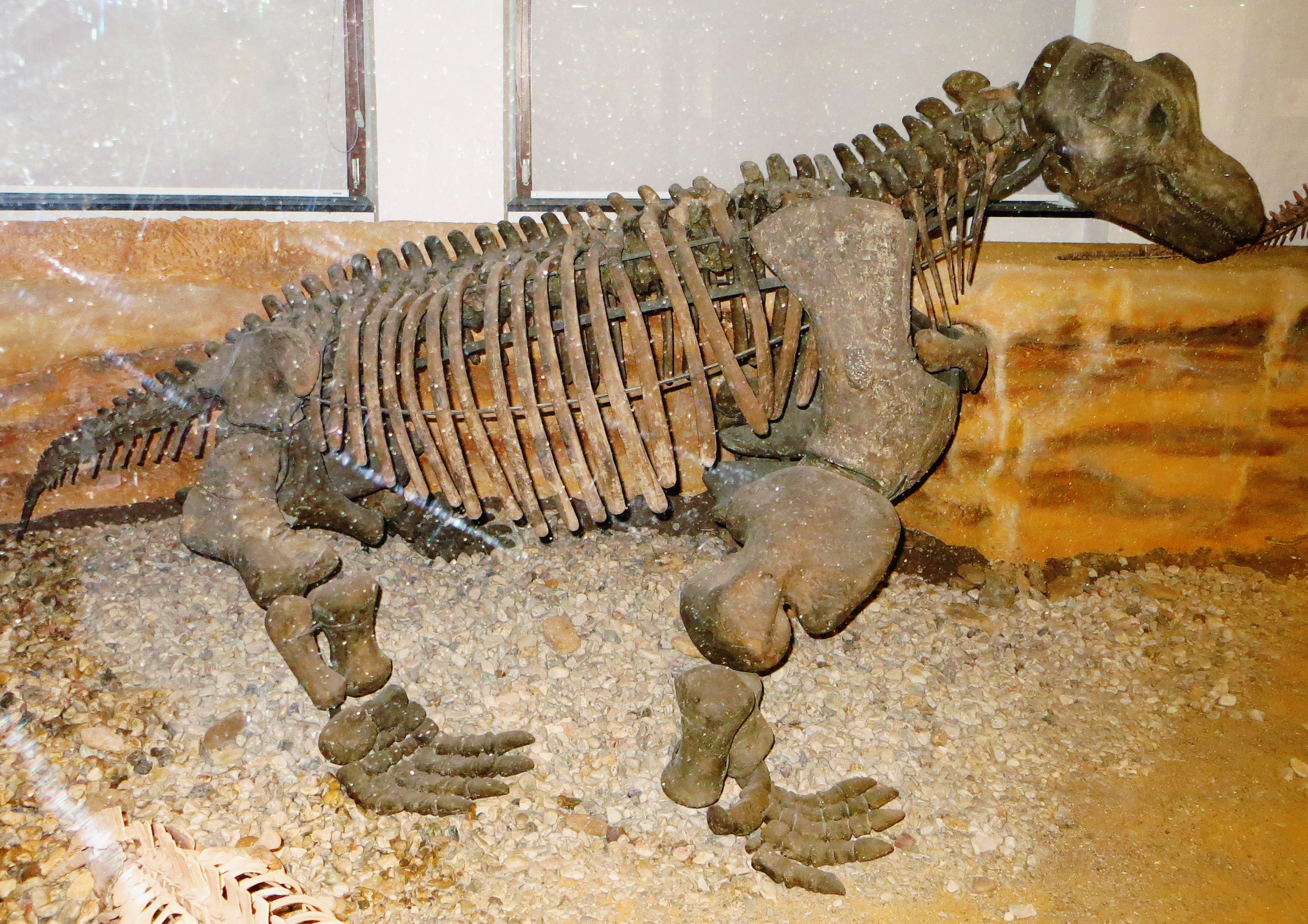
- Skeleton of Keratocephalus moloch

Scientific classification
- Kingdom: Animalia
- Phylum: Chordata
- Clade: Synapsida
- Clade: Therapsida
- Suborder: †Dinocephalia
- Family: †Tapinocephalidae
- Subtribe: †Tapinocephalina
- Genus: †Keratocephalus von Huene, 1931
- Species: †K. moloch

Binomial name
- †Keratocephalus moloch von Huene, 1931

Synonyms
- Pelosuchus Broom, 1905

= Keratocephalus =

Keratocephalus Temporal range: Capitanian

Extinct genus of therapsids

Keratocephalus ("horned head") is an extinct genus of tapinocephalian therapsids from the early Capitanian age of South Africa.

== Distribution ==
It was found in the Lower and Middle Tapinocephalus Assemblage Zone of the Karoo deposits, in the Lower Beaufort Beds in Beaufort West

== Description ==
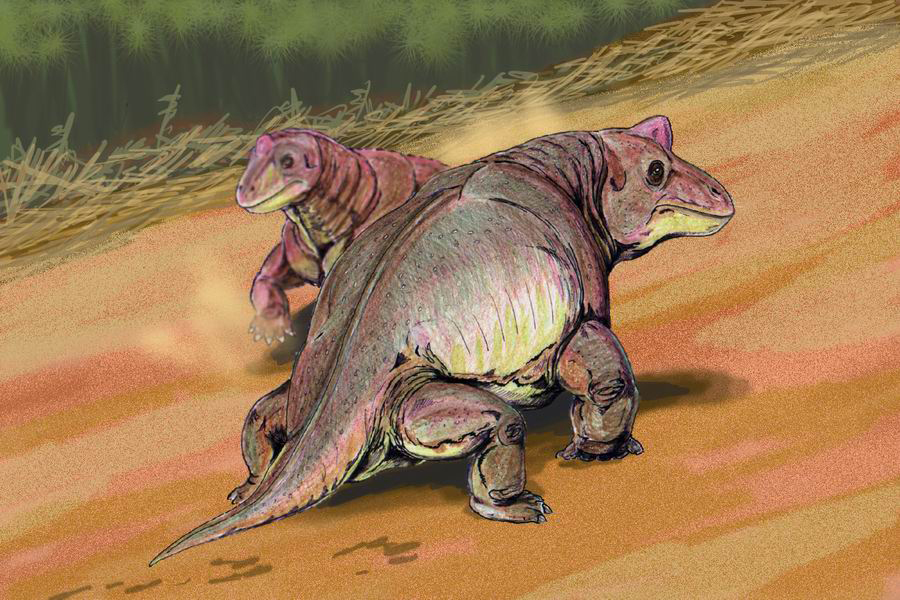
Restoration

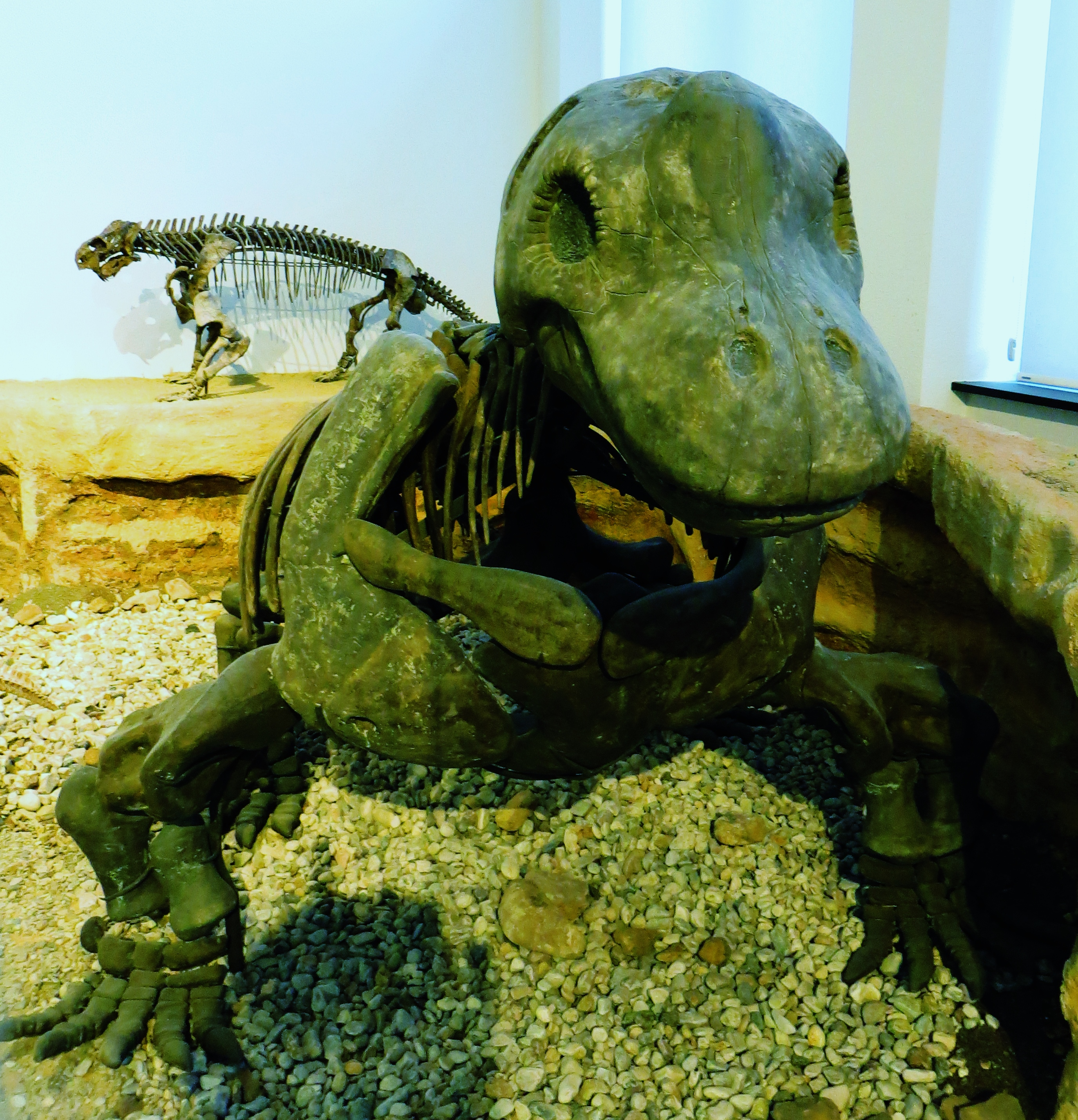
Front view

It was 2.5 to 3 m (8 ft 2 in to 9 ft 10 in) long, with 50 cm (20 in) long skull and had a mass of 700 to 1,000 kg (1,500 to 2,200 lb) with a variable snout length, variable pachyostosis with a nasofrontal boss raised into a horn-like shape.

== Classification ==
Keratocephalus moloch, known from a number of greatly variable skulls, along with postcrania, from the Lower and Middle Tapinocephalus zone, shows considerable variability in the pachyostotic development. It may be not as derived as Tapinocephalus. The naso-frontal boss is raised into a sort of horn (hence the name - "horned head") and the length of the snout varies greatly. This in itself throws doubt on Boonstra's distinction between short and long-snouted forms. Pelosuchus, known only on the basis of postcranial features, is a synonym of this genus. Neumann (2020), however, considers Keratocephalus a junior synonym of Struthiocephalus.
