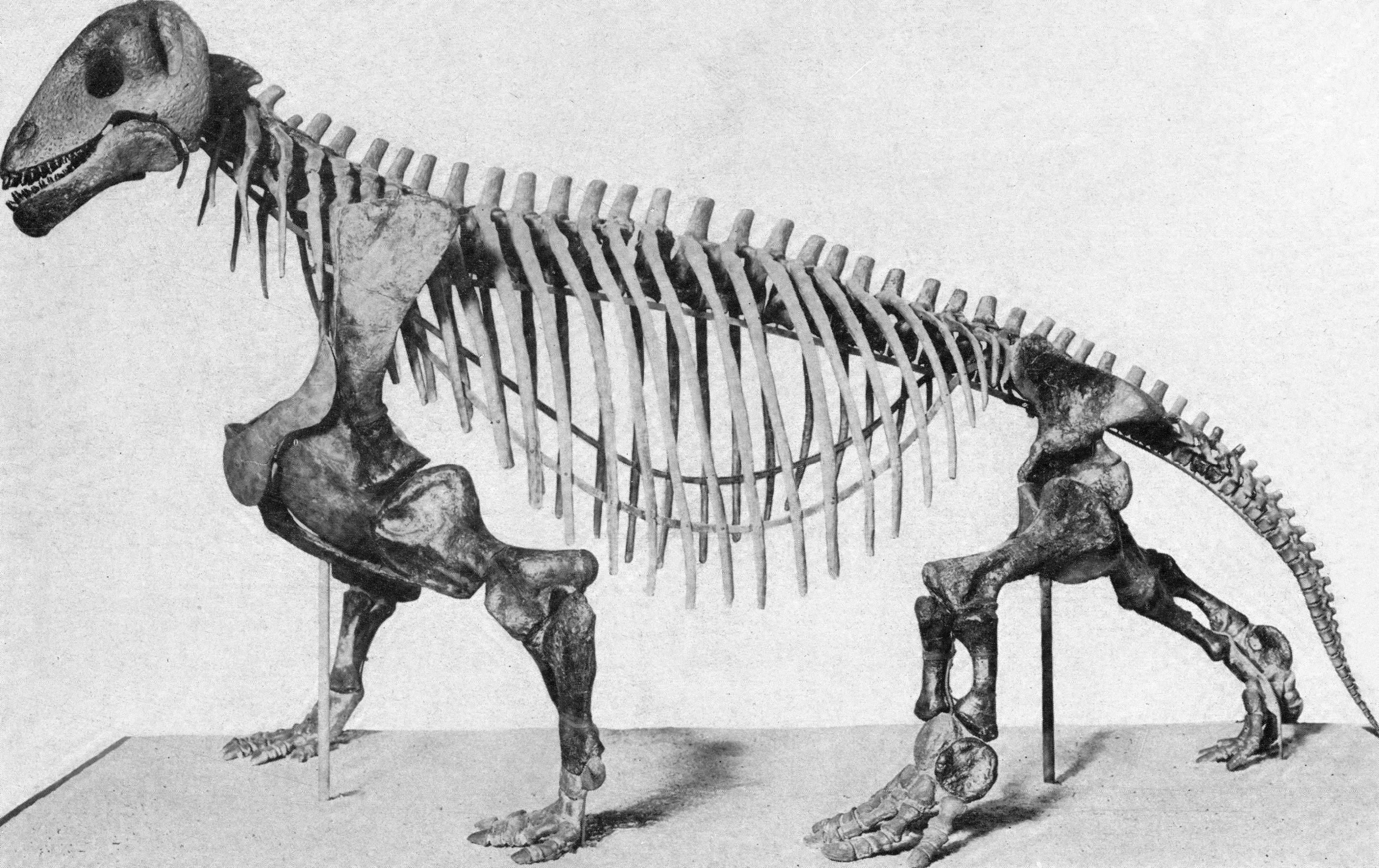
- Mounted skeleton of Moschops capensis. The skeleton is displayed at the American Museum of Natural History

Scientific classification
- Kingdom: Animalia
- Phylum: Chordata
- Clade: Synapsida
- Clade: Therapsida
- Suborder: †Dinocephalia
- Infraorder: †Tapinocephalia
- Family: †Tapinocephalidae; Lydekker, 1890

Subgroups
- †Tapinocaninus; †Riebeeckosaurus; †Struthiocephalus; †Moschognathus; †Criocephalosaurus; †Moschops; †Ulemosaurus; †Keratocephalus; †Tapinocephalus

= Tapinocephalidae =

Tapinocephalidae Temporal range: Middle Permian, 268–260 Ma

Extinct family of therapsids

Tapinocephalidae is an extinct family of herbivorous dinocephalian therapsids. They are known from Russia, southern Africa, and Brazil, and probably were widely distributed across Pangaea. They flourished briefly during the Wordian and Capitanian ages, radiating into several lineages, existing simultaneously, and differing mainly in details of the skull and, to a lesser degree, the skeleton. It has been debated whether or not they were semi-aquatic. They had thick, domed heads and are widely thought to have engaged in head-butting contests against rival individuals of the same species.

== Taxonomy ==
Tapinocephalidae is the titular member of the herbivorous Tapinocephalia, one of two major divisions of Dinocephalia alongside the carnivorous Anteosauria, with Tapinocephalia also including Estemmenosuchidae, and Styracocephalidae.

Phylogeny of Dinocephalia following Fraser-King et al. 2019.

- Dinocephalia
  - Anteosauria
    - Anteosauridae
  - Tapinocephalia
    - - Estemmenosuchidae
    - - - Styracocephalidae
      - - Titanosuchidae
        - Tapinocephalidae

The internal taxonomy of Tapinocephalidae is poorly resolved and in need of revision. Tapinocaninus and Riebeeckosaurus probably represent basal (early diverging) members of the group because they retain canine teeth, which other tapinocephalids lack.

== Description ==
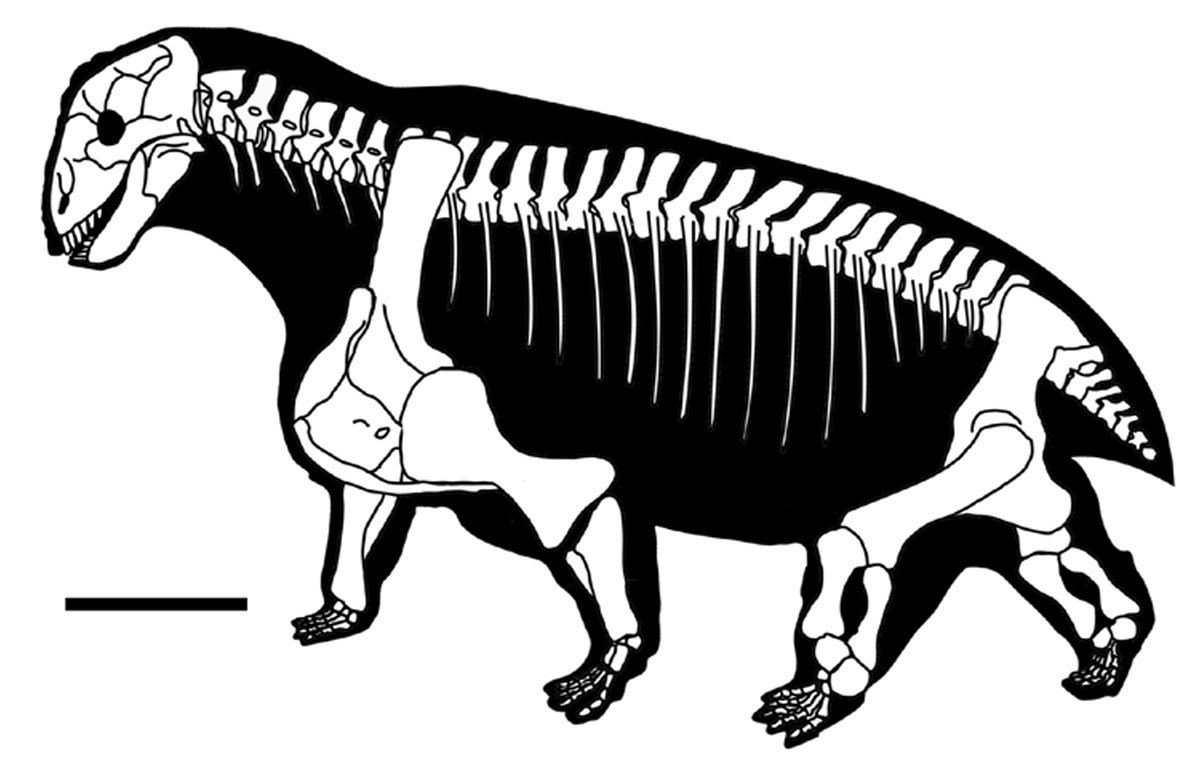
Skeleton of Tapinocaninus

Tapinocephalids have short tails, with the tail of Tapinocaninus being composed of only 7 caudal vertebrae (the tail of the famous Moschops mount in the American Museum of Natural History is entirely reconstructed), as well as a large barrel-shaped rib cage.

=== Skull ===
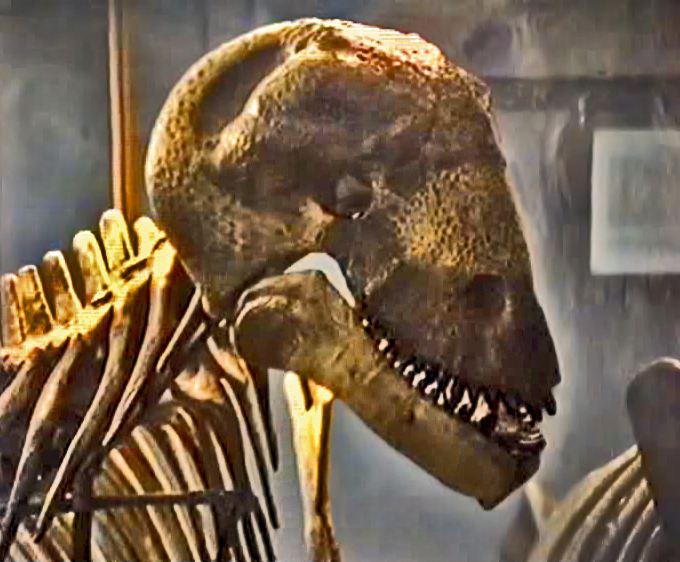
Skull of Moschops capensis

The tapinocephalid skull is massively constructed, and either long-snouted (e.g. Struthiocephalus) or high and short (e.g. Moschops). Very often the top of the head is rounded, and the bones of the forehead are elevated into a sort of dome or boss, in the middle of which is a large pineal opening. In some specimens this boss is of only moderate thickness, while in others it has become greatly thickened into a huge mass of bone (pachyostosis). It has been suggested that these animals engaged in intra-specific head-butting behavior, presumably for territory or mates. A similar thickening of the skull occurs in pachycephalosaurian ("boneheaded") dinosaurs, and it is speculated that all of these animals practiced head-butting behavior like modern goats and bighorn sheep, or Late Eocene titanotheres.

The quadrate bone of the skull is greatly elongated downward and forward, consequently shortening the jaw and increasing bite force due to more space occupied by the temporal muscles. In tapinocephalids, the teeth generally show little differentiation from each other (homodont) typically (with the exception of Tapinocaninus and Riebeeckosaurus) no distinct canines present, with 3-5 teeth in the premaxilla, 8-17 in the maxilla and 14-19 in the lower jaw.^{41-45, 57} The size of the teeth decrease in size posteriorly in the jaw. Like other dinocephalians, the teeth show the development of a "talon" and "heel" morphology, though in tapinocephalids the talon is modified to be elongate and face labially (directly outwards away from the interior of the mouth), which allows them to precisely interlock with the teeth on the opposing lower jaw for a shearing bite, with the interlocking present on all teeth, rather than just the front incisor teeth in other dinocephalians.^{41-45, 57} In life, these teeth were only attached to the jaws by ligaments (gomphosis) which decayed during fossilisation, resulting in the skulls of tapinocephalids being frequently found without teeth. These teeth were continuously replaced throughout life.

=== Size ===
Size of Moschops individuals compared to a human

All tapinocephalids were relatively large sized, with Tapinocaninus estimated via volumetric methods to reach a body mass of approximately 892 kilograms (1,967 lb), making them some of the first synapsids to have approached a body mass of 1 tonne.

== Palaeobiology ==
=== Ecology ===
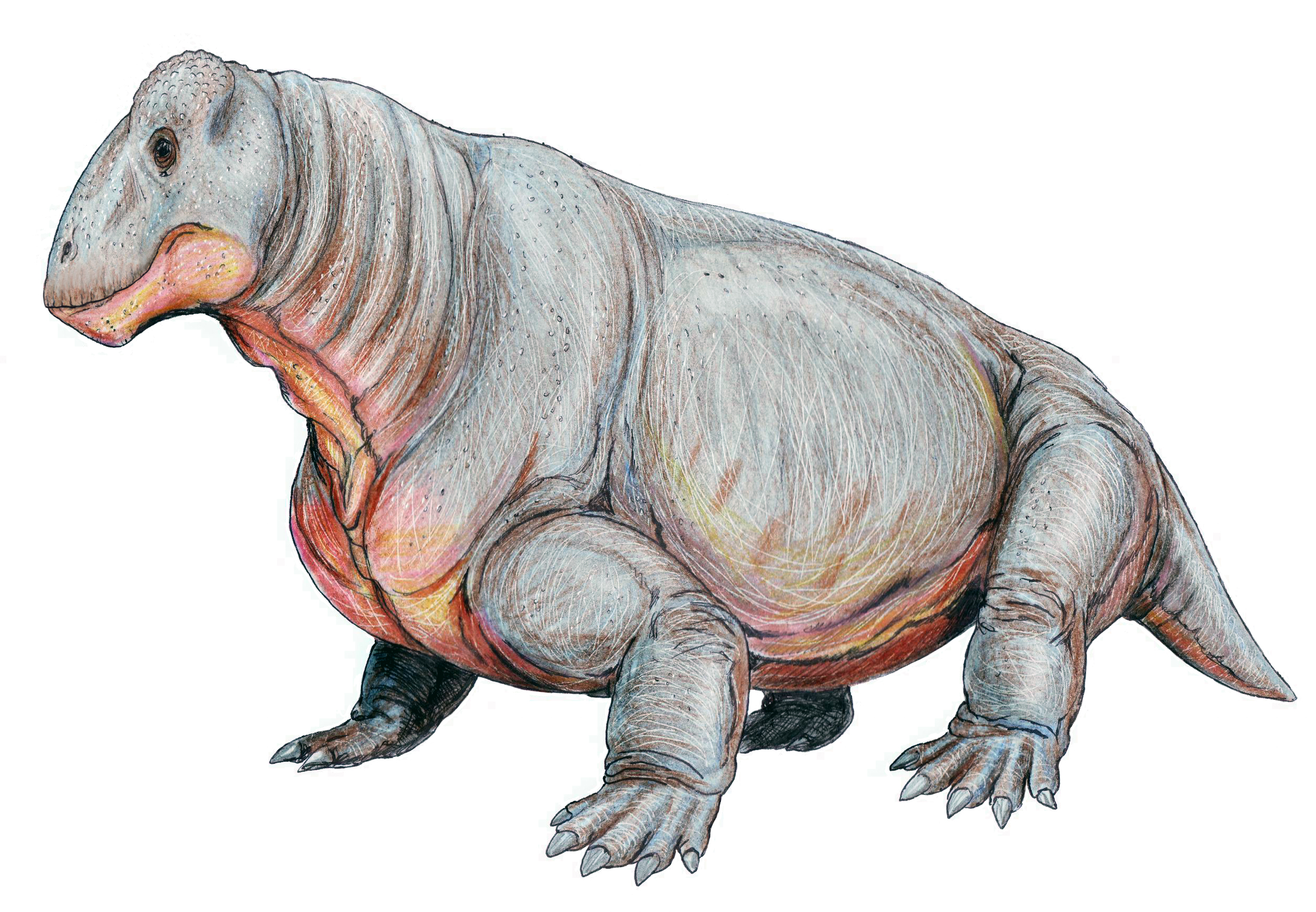
Restoration of Ulemosaurus

There is some disagreement over whether these animals lived in dry upland environments (Colbert), swamps, or either, depending on the species or tribe. There is no doubt that the Tapinocephalidae occupied different ecological niches. However, the tendency of earlier writers like Gregory (1926) and Boonstra (1965) to consider them semi-aquatic wallowers is reminiscent of the old fable of the sauropods consigned to the swamps because their limbs were too clumsy and their bodies too heavy for them to exist on dry land. In fact, if they were head-butters, it is unlikely they could have been clumsy swamp wallowers, since head-butting implies some degree of mobility.

Boonstra suggests that form such as Tapinocephalus and Struthiocephalus were semi-aquatic, while Moschops was terrestrial. It is quite likely that some tapinocephalid species may have frequented pond margins, feeding on soft vegetation, others preferred dry uplands.

Gregory (1926) considered that dinocephalians were aquatic animals, the wide hands and feet and the extensive fore and aft reach being useful for propelling the animal through water and the massive forehead being an advantage in diving. He suggested that the pineal organ might have been phototropic, helping the animal to orient itself relative to the surface of the water.

Tapinocephalines were seen by Boonstra (1956) as semi-aquatic animals. The cumbersome body, poor locomotor apparatus and feeble lower jaw and massive cranium all suggested to him that these animals could not have fed efficiently on land on tough vegetation. Instead he presented them as wallowers, being buoyed up by water, feeding on soft marsh vegetation.

=== Physiology ===
Rescuing the tapinocephalids from a life of diluvian swamp-wallowing, Bakker (1975, 1986) argued that bone histology, geographic distribution, and predator-prey relationships showed that these were active, fully terrestrial and at least partially endothermic animals, midway between the ectothermic pelycosaurs and the fully endothermic theriodonts.

Others like McNab and Geist suggest that the tapinocephalids were better considered inertial homeotherms, with the large barrel-like body and short tail being the most efficient surface for conserving heat.

=== Head-butting and social behaviour ===
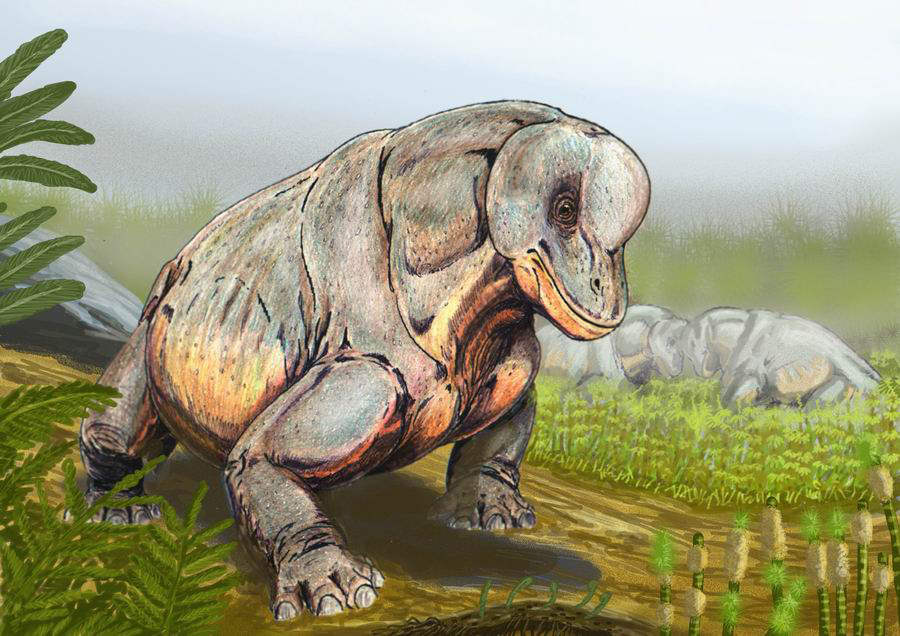
Head-butting behaviour of Tapinocephalus (background right)

It is widely accepted that tapinocephalids engaged in head-butting, likely as part of fighting to assert dominance over rival individuals of the same species for territory and mating rights, implying that tapinocephalids had complex social behaviour and were possibly gregarious, though this is tempered by the lack of evidence for gregarious trackways for tapinocephalids. Possibly heatbutting-related damage to juvenile tapinocephalid skulls suggests that they may have begun headbutting as play fighting at an early age.
