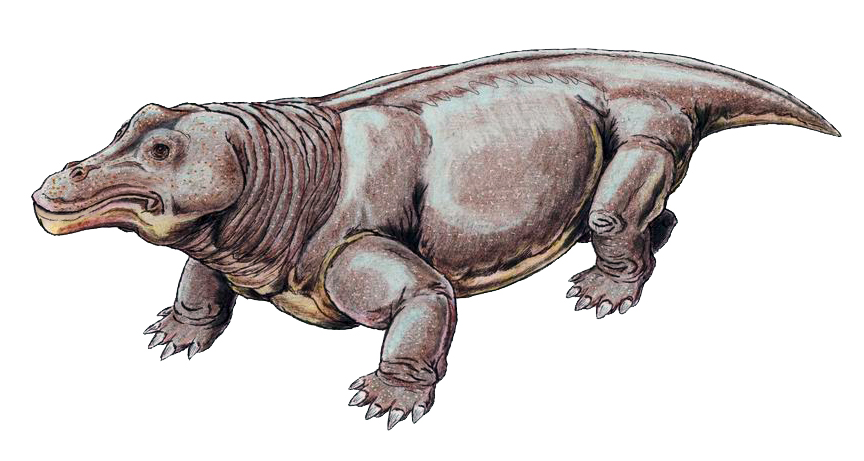
- Life restoration

Scientific classification
- Kingdom: Animalia
- Phylum: Chordata
- Clade: Synapsida
- Clade: Therapsida
- Suborder: †Dinocephalia
- Family: †Tapinocephalidae
- Genus: †Struthiocephalus; Haughton, 1915
- Species: †S. whaitsi

Binomial name
- †Struthiocephalus whaitsi Haughton, 1915

Synonyms
- Keratocephalus?; Moschosaurus; Struthiocephalellus; Struthiocephaloides; Struthionops; Taurocephalus

= Struthiocephalus =

Struthiocephalus Temporal range: Capitanian, 265–260 Ma

Extinct genus of therapsids

Struthiocephalus ("ostrich head") is an extinct genus of dinocephalian therapsids from the Middle Permian (Capitanian) of South Africa.

== Description ==
Struthiocephalus was a large animal, with a 2017 study estimating a 288 kg (635 lb) in body mass. The forehead of Struthiocephalus has a large boss (growth), which may have served as the base of a keratinous horn.

== Classification ==
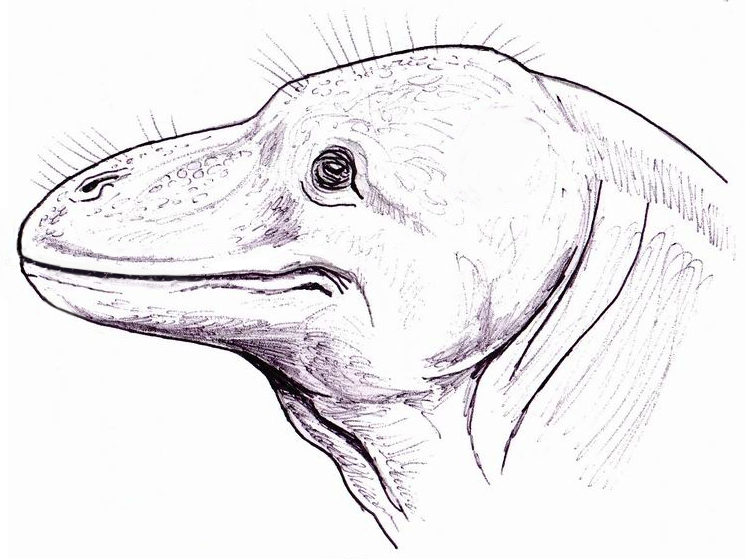
Restoration of the head

The long-snouted Struthiocephalus whaitsi would seem to be the only genus and species of this taxon. There are a large number of synonyms.

Struthiocephalellus is apparently a juvenile of Struthiocephalus. Boonstra showed that the seven named species of Struthiocephalus represent a growth series and are hence synonyms of the first described species, S. whaitsi.

Struthiocephalus is characterized simply by a naso-frontal boss in mature specimens, whilst the very similar genus Struthiocephaloides lacks this character. This is consistent with a sexually dimorphic character, as well as a role in intraspecific combat. Barghusen (1975) considers would be more effective in flank butting than head-butting per se. In head-on combat the presumed horn would be deflected by the opponent's head and contact would be lost, but in flank butting a horned boss would concentrate the blow. Both Struthiocephalus and Struthiocephaloides have the same stratigraphic range - Lower to Middle Tapinocephalus Zone.

Of the remaining two monospecific genera, Struthionops intermedius known from a single skull, possesses a naso-frontal boss moderate pachyostosis and a fairly short snout. Possibly this is a variant of another species. On the basis of the shorter snout, King (1988) includes this species among the Tapinocephalini.

Taurocephalus lerouxi, known from a single skull, has a fairly strong snout and 20 teeth in the upper jaw (more than usual for tapinocephalids). Since tooth count tends to vary greatly among individual dinocephalians, again only this is also likely a variant individual, most probably Struthiocephalus.

The remaining species, Moschosaurus longiceps is known from a single small and lightly built skull about 25 centimetres (10 in) long from the Upper Tapinocephalus Zone. It was originally placed in its own family, the Moschosauridae, and considered a good ancestral or primitive form (despite its late date). However, Boonstra (1969) identifies it as a juvenile Struthiocephalus.

Furthermore, Keratocephalus has also been proposed as a synonym of Struthiocephalus.

== Paleobiology ==
This animal has the largest head of any tapinocephalid. Brink (1956) suggests that Struthiocephalus fed in or near water, the teeth being used for rooting up, gathering and grasping plant matter. Boonstra (1965) likewise considered that Struthiocephalus fed on soft vegetation, possibly under water. He suggested the postcranial skeleton possibly showed adaptations to living in marshy conditions, and the bone surface around the nostril might indicate the presence of a fleshy valve present used for closing off the nostril under water. The boss and possible horn of Struthiocephalus may have been used for combat between rival individuals.

== See also ==
- List of therapsids
