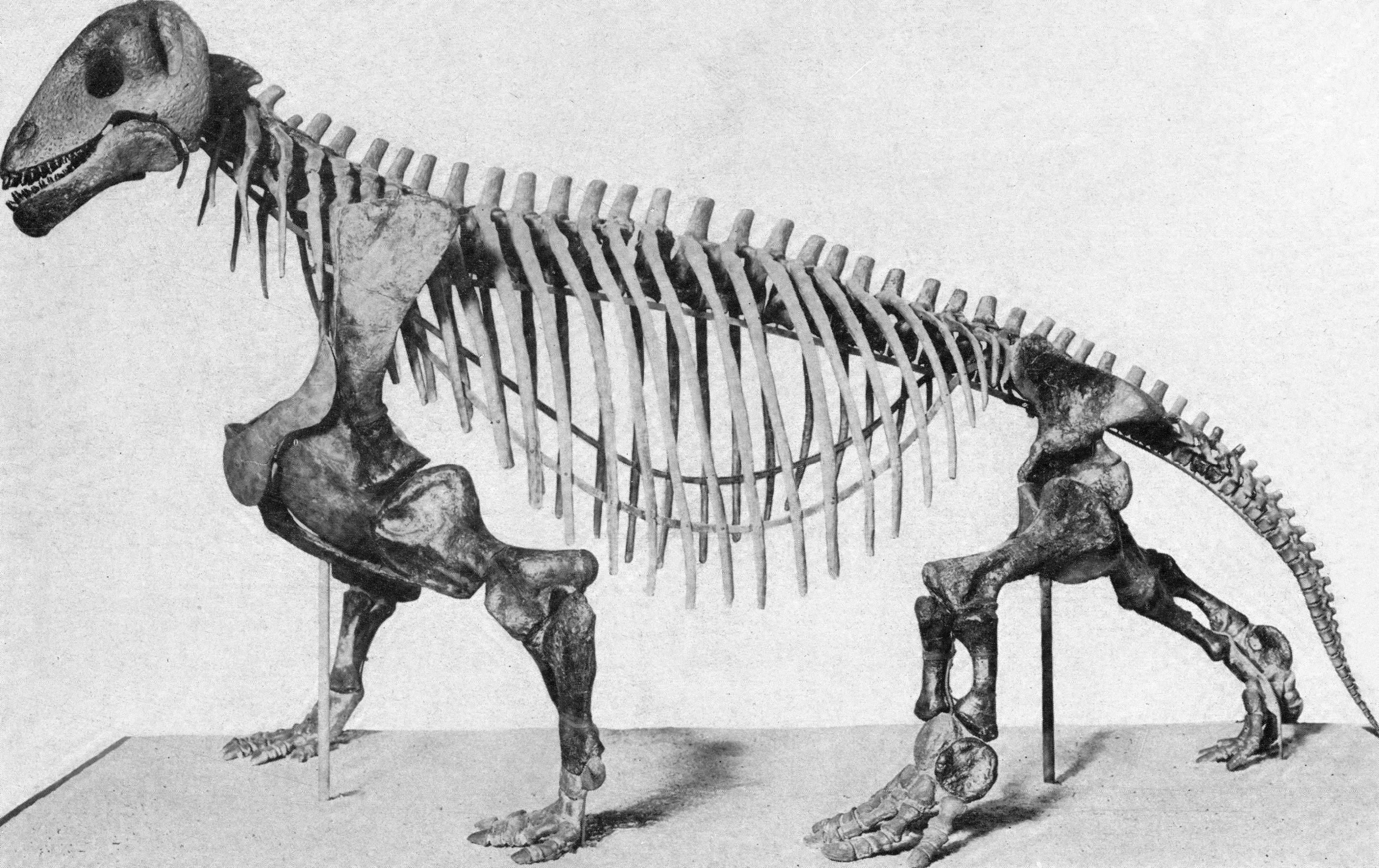
- 1920s photograph of the mounted M. capensis skeleton AMNH 5552, on display at the American Museum of Natural History

Scientific classification
- Kingdom: Animalia
- Phylum: Chordata
- Clade: Synapsida
- Clade: Therapsida
- Suborder: †Dinocephalia
- Family: †Tapinocephalidae
- Subtribe: †Moschopina
- Genus: †Moschops; Broom, 1911

Type species
- †Moschops capensis Broom, 1911

Species
- †M. capensis Broom, 1911; †M. koupensis Boonstra, 1957; †M. oweni? (Watson, 1914) Boonstra 1969; †M. whaitsi? (Broom, 1914) Boonstra 1969

Synonyms
- Agnosaurus Boonstra, 1952; Delphinognathus Seeley, 1892; Moschoides Byrne, 1937; Pnigalion Watson, 1914

= Moschops =

Moschops Temporal range: Capitanian, 264.4–260 Ma

Extinct genus of therapsids that lived in the Guadalupian epoch

Moschops (Greek for "calf face") is an extinct genus of dinocephalian therapsids that lived in what is now South Africa during the Capitanian stage of the Middle Permian around 264.4–260 million years ago. Fossils have been found in the Tapinocephalus Assemblage Zone of the Abrahamskraal Formation. Like other members of Tapinocephalidae, they were heavily built herbivores reaching a body mass of at least 400 kilograms (880 lb), and it has been debated whether or not they were semi-aquatic, like hippopotamuses. They had short, thick heads and are widely thought to have engaged in head-butting contests against rival individuals of the same species.

== Earliest finds ==
Moschops material was first discovered in the Karoo region of South Africa, on the Spitzkop farmstead north of the town of Laingsburg by Robert Broom and the Reverend John Henry Whaits, and they were brought by Broom before the American Museum of Natural History in New York City in 1910. The geologic horizon of these remains was dubious, though Broom suggested that they were from the Permian upper Ecca Group (part of the Karoo Supergroup). He came to this conclusion based on the absence of pareiasaurs and the discovery of a single tooth resembling those remains. This initial material includes a holotype (AMNH 5550) and seven topotypes (AMNH 5551-5557). The degree of pachyostosis varies within the skulls of the specimens, and Broom believed this to have been linked to variations in sex and age.

Subsequent authors have concluded that the remains discovered by Broom and Whaits actually came from the Tapinocephalus Assemblage Zone, dating to the Middle Permian.

== Description ==
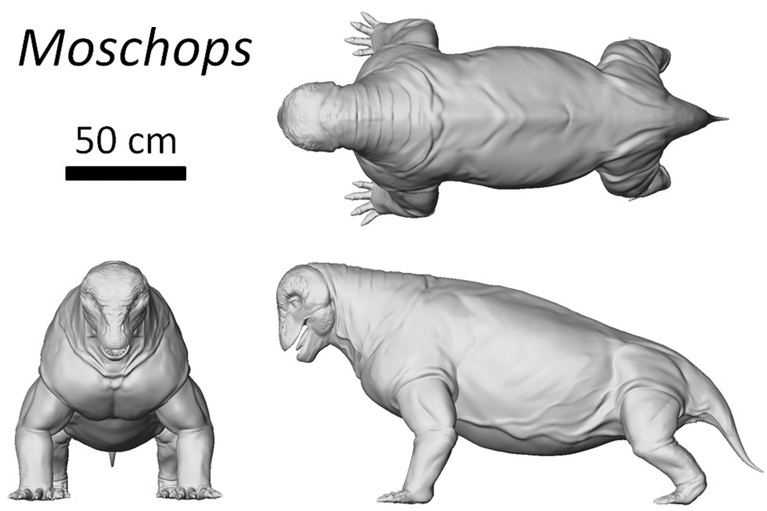
3D sculpted model of Moschops in various views

Size comparison of two Moschops capensis individuals to a human

Moschops were heavy set dinocephalian synapsids, with the AMNH 5552 specimen recorded as having a spine approximately 2.42 metres (7 ft 11.3 in) long measured along the length of the curve.^{187} A 2017 study estimated that Moschops weighed 129 kg (284 lb) on average was up to 327.4 kg (722 lb) in maximum body mass based on a regression formula, while a 2024 study estimated a body mass of approximately 406–426 kilograms (895–939 lb) for the SAM-PK-11972 specimen based on a sculpted 3D model, and suggested that this estimate was likely to be considerably more accurate than those based on regression formulae.

=== Skull and dentition ===
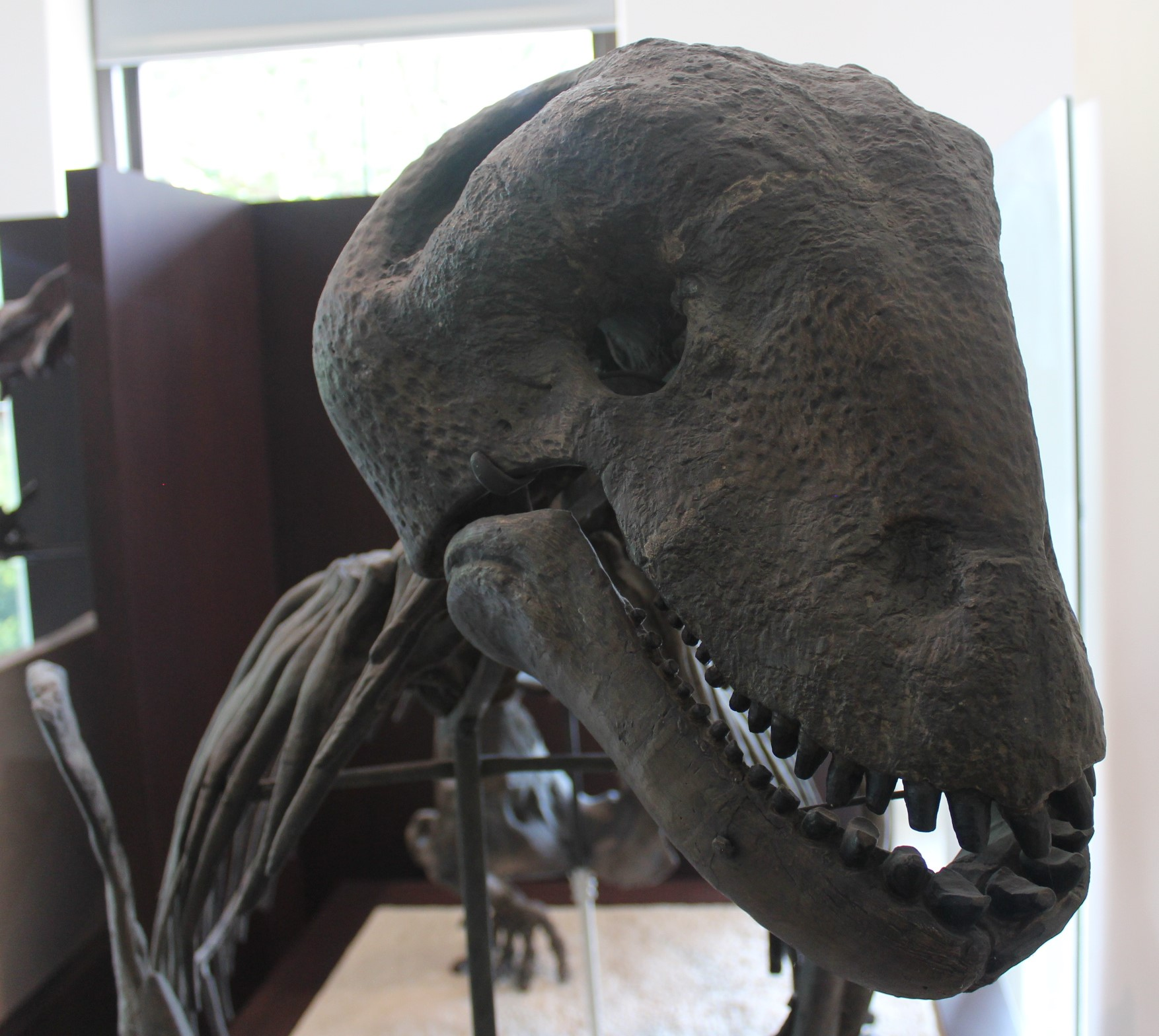
A close-up of a reconstructed Moschops capensis skull, from the American Museum of Natural History

Diagram of the skull bones in side on (left) and top-down (right) views

The head of Moschops is short, broad, and massive, and is especially wide around the orbits (eye sockets). It was deep posteriorly (towards the rear), though became far shallower anteriorly (towards the front) as well as broader. Like many other dinocephalians, the orbits are surrounded by a swollen mass of thickened bone, the trait the clade was named for. These structures, while likely used to headbutting, do not resemble the kind of headbutting implements (e.g., antlers and horns) seen in most modern mammals; rather, they most closely resemble patches of thickened bone observed in certain toothed whales, particularly bottlenose whales. It has long been suggested that these so-called cranial bosses were used in head-butting behaviours. The occiput was broad and deep, and would have served as an attachment site for powerful neck muscles, contributing to the broadness of the posterior skull. The pterygoid arches, which extend downwards from the rear of the skull, are heavy; in conjunction with the morphology of the angular bone of the lower jaw, the pterygoid muscles were likely very powerful. Like other dinocephalians and non-cynodont therapsids, the top of the skull had an opening for the parietal eye, a light-sensitive organ ancestrally found among terrestrial vertebrates which serves to regulate the circadian rhythm and thermoregulation. Like most other tapinocephalids, Moschops lacks the distinctive canine teeth ancestrally present in therapsids, and instead has teeth that are relatively similar from the back to the front of the mouth (homodont), generally becoming smaller to towards the back of the mouth. In life, these teeth were only attached to the jaws by ligaments (gomphosis) which decayed during fossilisation, resulting in the skulls of Moschops and other tapinocephalids being frequently found without teeth. Unlike mammal teeth, but similar to most other synapsid teeth, these teeth were continuously replaced throughout life. Like other tapinocephalids, the teeth were composed of a vertically pointing "talon", and a relatively flat "heel", when the jaws closed, the "talons" of the teeth precisely intermeshed with the "talons" on the teeth of the opposing jaw, creating an effective shearing bite.

=== Spinal column ===
The vertebrae of Moschops are holospondylous, meaning that the bones comprising them are fused. Moschops, like the closely related Moschognathus, appears to have 29 presacral vertebrae (the bones of the spinal column preceding the sacrum) and three sacral vertebrae, though the number of vertebrae in the spinal column is not absolutely certain. The neck is curved upwards, though not as strongly as in Moschognathus. Similarly, the cervical (neck) vertebrae were shorter than in that genus, particularly the axis (the second cervical vertebra). The cervical ribs would have attached fairly low down on the centra, far below the zygapophyses, owing to the position of the diapophyses. The more anterior dorsal (back) vertebrae are larger than the more posterior ones, reflecting the size disparity between the shoulder and hip regions. Each dorsal vertebra is heavily built, short anteroposteriorly (from front-to-back) and wide transversely (from side-to-side). Their anterior and posterior faces are flattened, a condition referred to as amphiplatyan. The lumbar (lower back) vertebrae are considerably thinner than the more anterior dorsal vertebrae. No complete posterior caudal (tail) vertebrae series is known from Moschops, though, as the anterior ones and the posterior sacrals are quite large, and William King Gregory suggested that the tail of Moschops was probably moderate in length. However, the complete tail of the related tapinocephalid Tapinocaninus is very short comprising only seven caudal vertebrae, suggesting that the tail of Moschops was probably considerably shorter than the 29 caudal vertebrae reconstructed in the AMNH 5552 mounted skeleton.

Ribs are present on all of Moschops' vertebrae, from the atlas (the first cervical vertebra) to the most posterior known caudal vertebra. Most of the ribs resemble those of more basal synapsids, though the first sacral rib is incredibly large, and may have provided a major support for the pelvis in life.

=== Limbs and pectoral and pelvic girdles ===
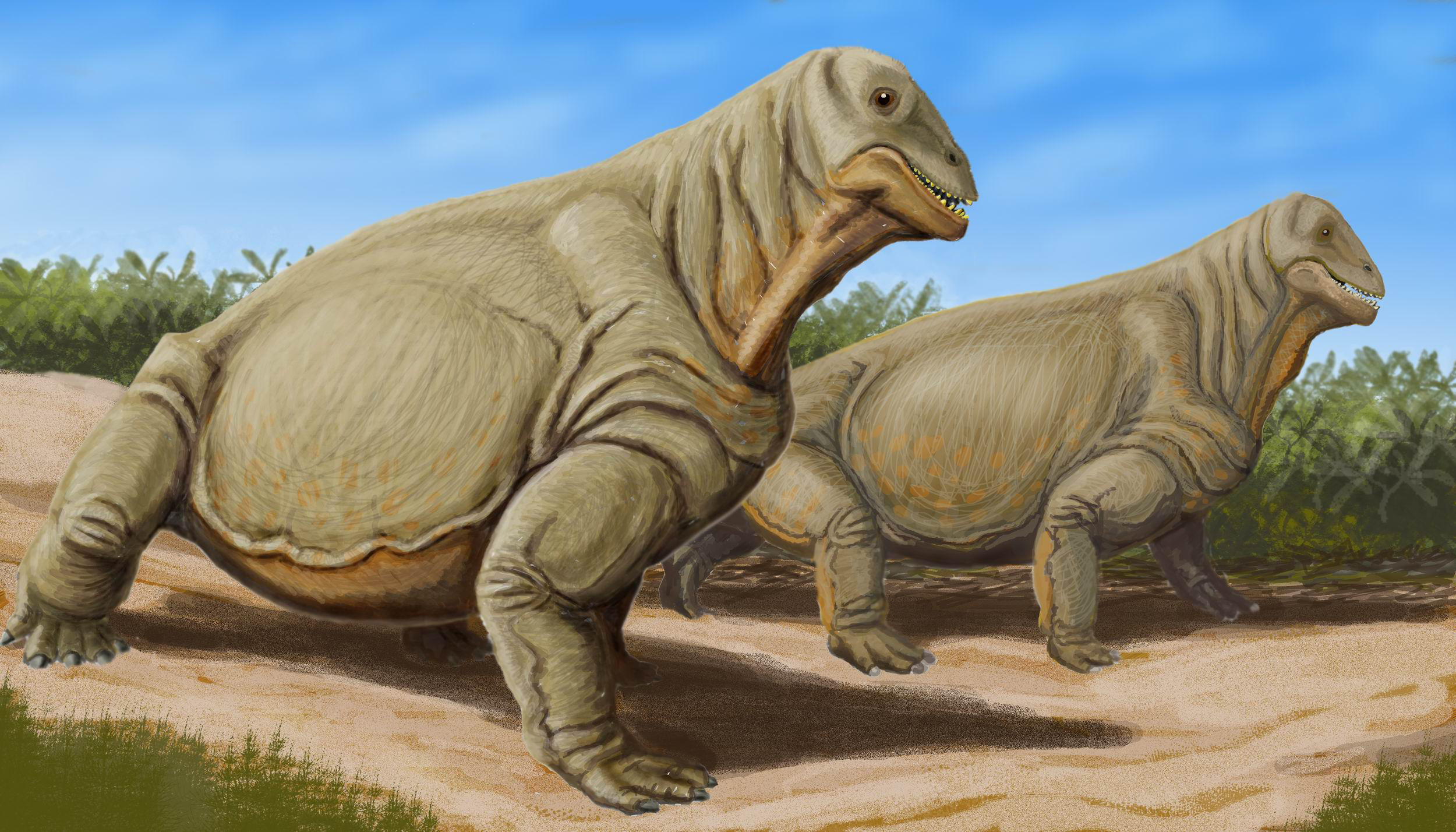
An artist's conception of Moschops capensis, based on the reconstruction of a skeleton found in a semi-desert region of South Africa. The skeleton is displayed at the American Museum of Natural History.

Moschops would have had a semi-erect gait, owing to the anatomy of its pectoral (shoulder) and pelvic (hip) girdles being intermediate between that of basal synapsids ("pelycosaurs") and more derived therapsids. William Gregory believed this would have given it a more mammalian posture than many of its contemporaries. When seen from the side, the scapula (shoulder blade) is very long, narrow in the middle and somewhat expanded towards the top. The roughening of the scapula's dorsal (upper) border suggests that a cartilaginous plate, the suprascapula, was present. A vestigial cleithrum is present, as in other dinocephalians and anomodonts (dicynodonts and their close relatives). The digits of Moschops are fairly short and were compared by Gregory to those of tortoises. He suggested that Moschops would have walked with a semi-digitigrade gait. Due to the morphology of its pelvic girdle, and the noting of similarities with pinnipeds, Gregory suggested that Moschops would have rested with its hind limbs directed backwards like a seal.

== Classification ==
Moschops is classified as part of Dinocephalia, which is part of Therapsida, which also includes cynodonts and their mammalian descendants. Dinocephalians were the dominant group of therapsids during the Middle Permian, encompassing both large carnivores and herbivores. Within Dinocephalia, Moschops is placed as part of the herbivorous Tapinocephalidae. A 2009 study considered four species to be potentially valid, Moschops capensis, Moschops koupensis, Moschops whaitsi and Moschops oweni, but stated that this assessment was preliminary, as no detailed taxonomic revision had been taken of tapinocephalids for several decades up to that point. Further revisions of the taxonomy of Moschops have yet to be published, although from 2015 onwards M. whaitsi has been returned to its original genus Moschognathus in scientific literature and once again regarded as distinct.

Delphinognathus conocephalus could represent juvenile Moschops, thus possibly synonymous. Delphinognathus is only known from a single, moderately pachyostosed skull. It has a conical boss on the parietal surrounding the pineal foramen. However, it has otherwise been suggested that Delphinognathus is an indeterminate juvenile tapinocephalid that cannot be assigned to any other tapinocephalid genus with confidence. A subadult tapinocephalid skull (AM 4950) which was originally attributed to Moschops capensis, was the subject of an analysis of the anatomy of its cranial vault in 2017 under the assumption it represented that species. However, this skull is now referred to Moschognathus whaitsi rather than to Moschops.

== Palaeobiology ==
The dimensions of the sclerotic rings in the eye sockets (orbits) of Moschops are intermediate between those of living nocturnal, diurnal (day active) and cathemeral (active at irregular intervals) animals, leaving its activity pattern ambiguous. Due to the possession of long-crowned, stout teeth, it is believed that Moschops was a herbivore feeding on nutrient-poor and tough vegetation. Due to the presumably nutrient-poor diet, it is likely they had to feed for long periods of time. Like other tapinocephalids, the teeth tightly interlocked when the jaw was closed,

The osteohistology (inner bone anatomy) of Moschops is characterised by a very well developed medullary spongiosa and a thick layer of cortical bone, which has been argued to support that Moschops had a semi-aquatic lifestyle. However, analysis of the lateral canals of the inner ears of AM 4950 (originally suggested to be Moschops capensis, but later suggested to belong to the related tapinocephalid Moschognathus) suggests that the head was habitually held near vertical, which contradicts such a lifestyle, suggesting instead that Moschops was instead terrestrial. A later 2026 study based on skulls that represented Moschops proper questioned this analysis, suggesting that the connection between the shape of the inner ear and the angle the head is habitually held in life was weaker than thought, and the "short and stubby" inner ear implying that Moschops had weak gaze stabilization and oculomotor abilities, and thus was likely a slow animal similar to living hippos and elephants, in combination with the retracted nostrils and the robustness of the bones, were consistent with a semiaquatic habit.

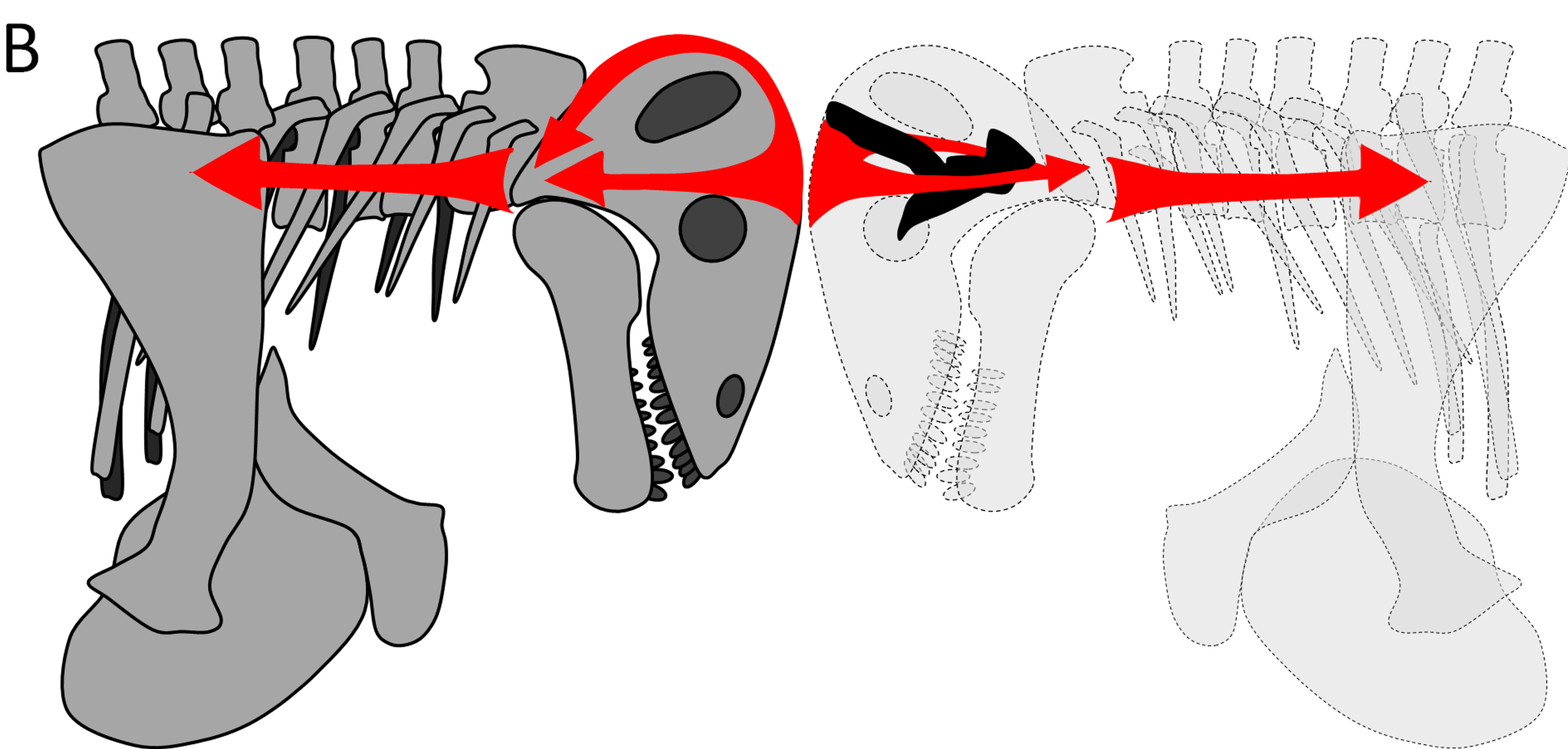
Diagram of tapinocephalid skeletons in headbutting combat pose, with the red arrows showing direction of force dissipation, with black area in right skull showing the location of the brain cavity and pineal tube

In 1926, William Gregory suggested that Moschops may have been adapted for taking "sudden lunges" towards adversaries and inflicting severe bite wounds. The dome-like head has led to it being widely thought that Moschops and other tapinocephalids (and possibly also other dinocephalians) engaged in head-butting fighting behaviour against other individuals of the same species, likely to assert dominance over other individuals for mating rights and territory, implying that Moschops was gregarious (though gregariousness in tapinocephalids has been considered ambiguous due to a lack of group trackways attributed to them) and had complex social behaviour. Headbutting behaviour is supported by the anatomy of the endocast (the internal skull space occupied by the brain), which suggests that the brain did not closely adhere to the walls of the cranial vault (which is relatively large compared to other synapsids) and was surrounded by a thick layer of protective tissue, likely to mitigate potential damage to the brain caused by headbutting. Similar tissue is suggested to have lined the pineal tube connecting the brain to the parietal eye. Possible headbutting-related skull damage in juvenile tapinocephalid individuals may suggest that they began play fighting relatively intense head-butting from an early age. The heavily thickened domed head may have also served for display purposes in addition to combat.

== Paleoecology ==
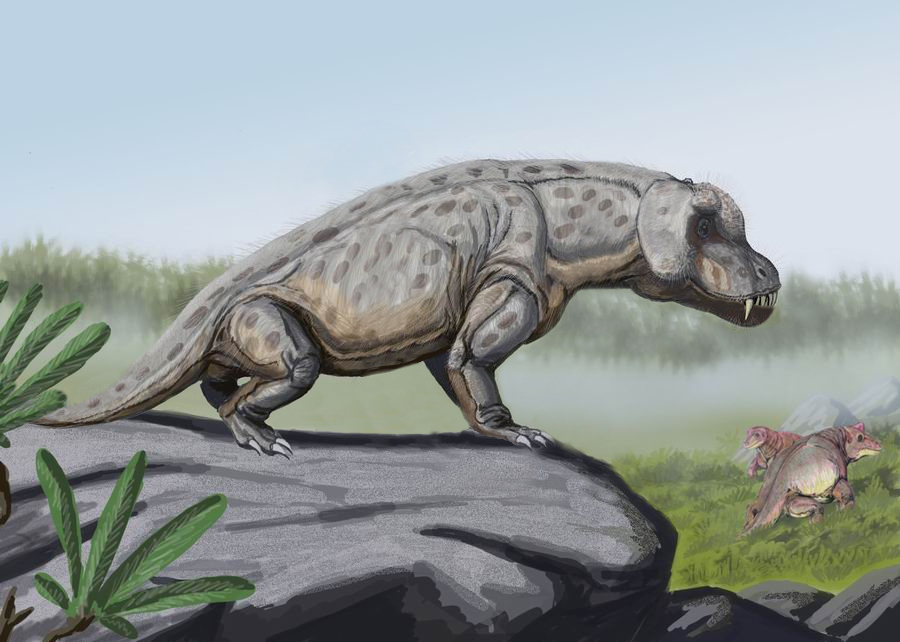
Life restoration of Anteosaurus, a large predatory dinocephalian also known from the Tapinocephalus Assemblage Zone

Moschops is known from the Tapinocephalus Assemblage Zone (which forms a subsection of the Abrahamskraal Formation, in turn part of the Karoo Supergroup), which a 2022 study dated as lasting from around 264.4 to 260 million years ago, during the Capitanian stage of the Middle Permian (Guadalupian). At this time, South Africa was located in the southern part of the supercontinent Pangaea, adjacent to what is now South America and Antarctica. The Tapinocephalus Assemblage Zone, like other assemblage zones within the Abrahamskraal Formation, is thought to have been deposited in a semi-arid environment with strong seasonal variation in rainfall, with the landscape being crossed with rivers and their heavily vegetated ﬂoodplains. Episodes of heavy rainfall are likely to have resulted in flooding episodes. Dinocephalians form a prominent component of the local fauna during this period, alongside Moschops including other herbivorous tapinocephalians like the titular Tapinocephalus, Criocephalosaurus, and Struthiocephalus, herbivorous or omnivorous titanosuchians like Titanosuchus and Jonkeria, and the large predatory anteosaur Anteosaurus. Other therapsids present include predatory biarmosuchians, gorgonopsids and therocephalians, and herbivorous anomodonts including dicynodonts. Other large animals include herbivorous pareiasaurian reptiles like Bradysaurus. The ecosystem of the Tapinocephalus Assemblage Zone was disrupted by the end-Capitanian mass extinction event, which caused all dinocephalians to become extinct.

== Cultural references ==
Louis Marx and Company released a sculpted plastic toy figurine of Moschops in 1961, making it one of the first prehistoric animals to be made into a mass-produced toy, though in comparison to other prehistoric animal toys released around this time it was rarely reproduced. The eponymous 1983 animated British children's television series Moschops features a member of the genus as a main character. Members of the genus form the titular main characters of the 2000 animated short film The Moschops by Jim Trainor. Moschops is one of many prehistoric animals featured in the 2017 video game Ark: Survival Evolved, though it is incorrectly referred to as a "dinosaur" in the in-game information.

== See also ==
- List of therapsids
