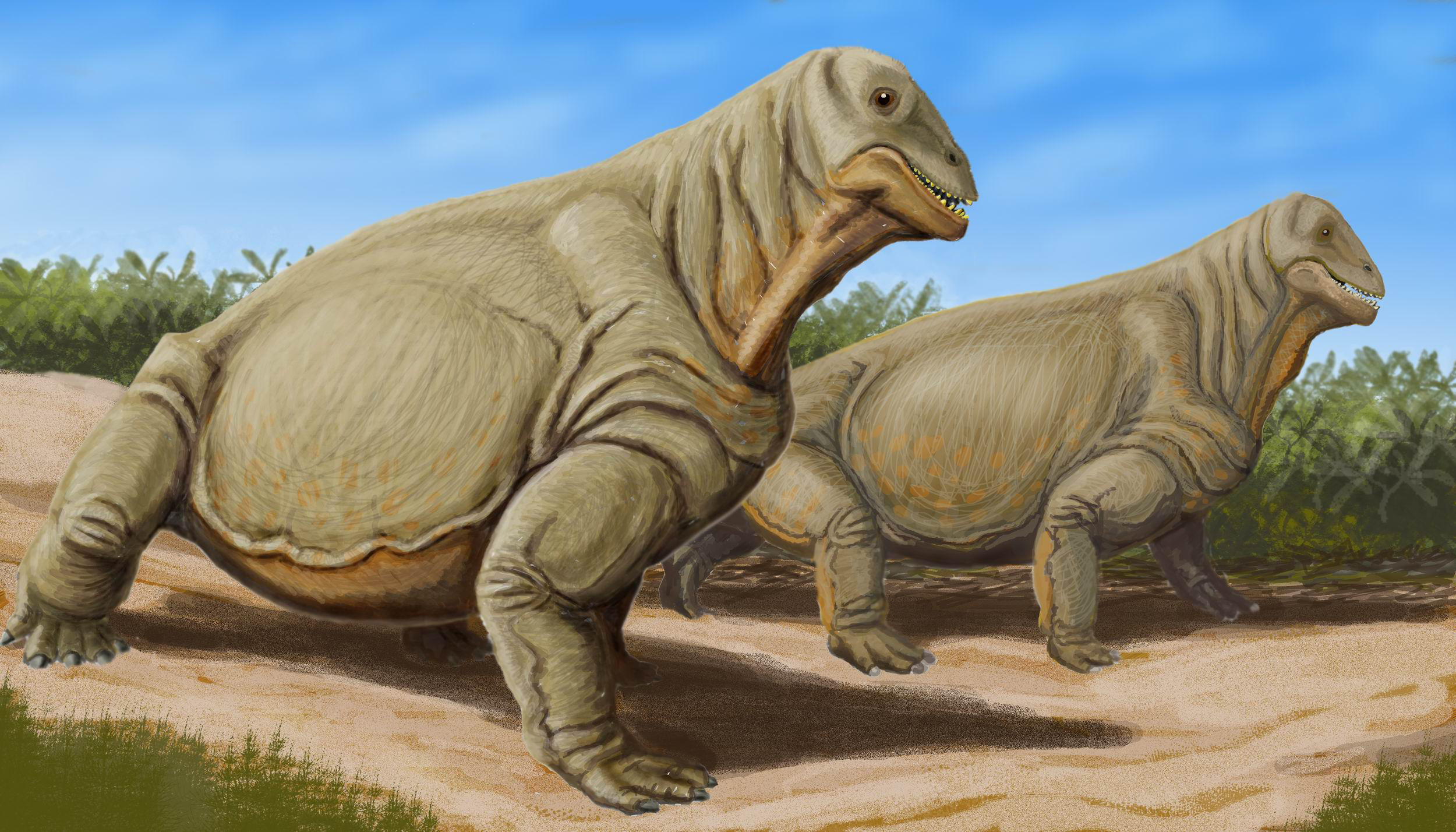
- Moschops (Tapinocephalidae)
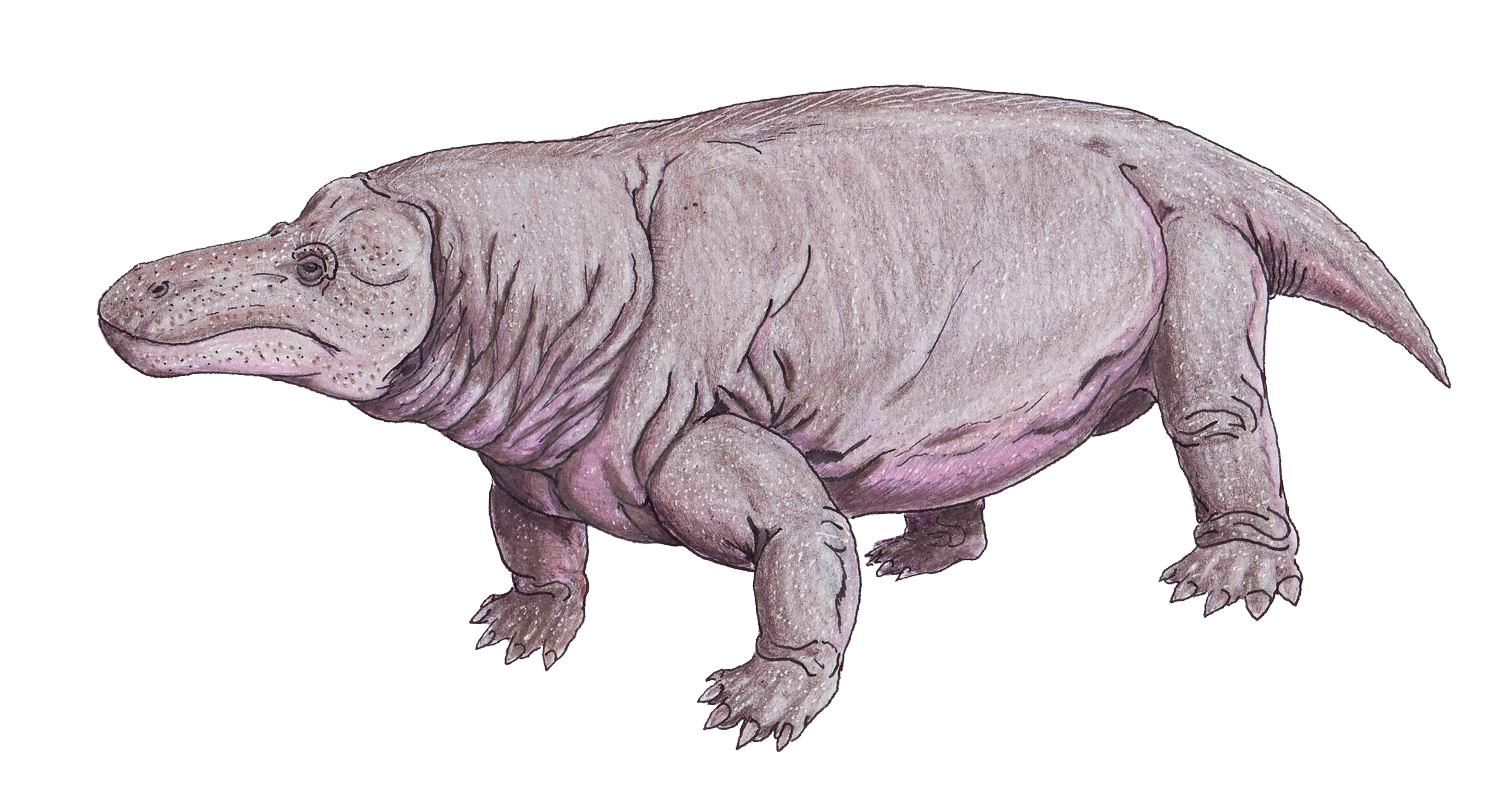
- Jonkeria (Titanosuchidae)

Scientific classification
- Kingdom: Animalia
- Phylum: Chordata
- Clade: Synapsida
- Clade: Therapsida
- Suborder: †Dinocephalia
- Infraorder: †Tapinocephalia; Broom, 1923

Subgroups
- †Brithopus; †Dimacrodon?; †Deuterosaurus; †Estemmenosuchidae; †Driveriidae?; †Mastersoniidae?; †Styracocephalidae; †Tapinocephalidae; †Titanosuchidae

= Tapinocephalia =

Tapinocephalia Temporal range: Middle Permian, 268–260 Ma (possible Kungurian record)

Extinct clade of therapsids

The Tapinocephalia are one of the major groups of dinocephalian therapsids and the major herbivorous group. Tapinocephalia has been found to consist of three clades: Styracocephalidae, Titanosuchidae, and the very successful Tapinocephalidae. Notable tapinocephalians include Moschops, Tapinocephalus, and Titanosuchus.

== Description ==
Unlike anteosaurs and estemmenosuchids, tapinocephalians are primarily an African group. The estemmenosuchids and pareiasaurs may have occupied this paleo-bovine niche in the north. Only one tapinocephalian, Ulemosaurus, is known from Russia. Earlier tapinocephalians were carnivorous or omnivorous. One such group was Titanosuchidae, which consisted of long-tailed predators that hunted herbivorous therapsids. Later tapinocephalians were herbivorous.
