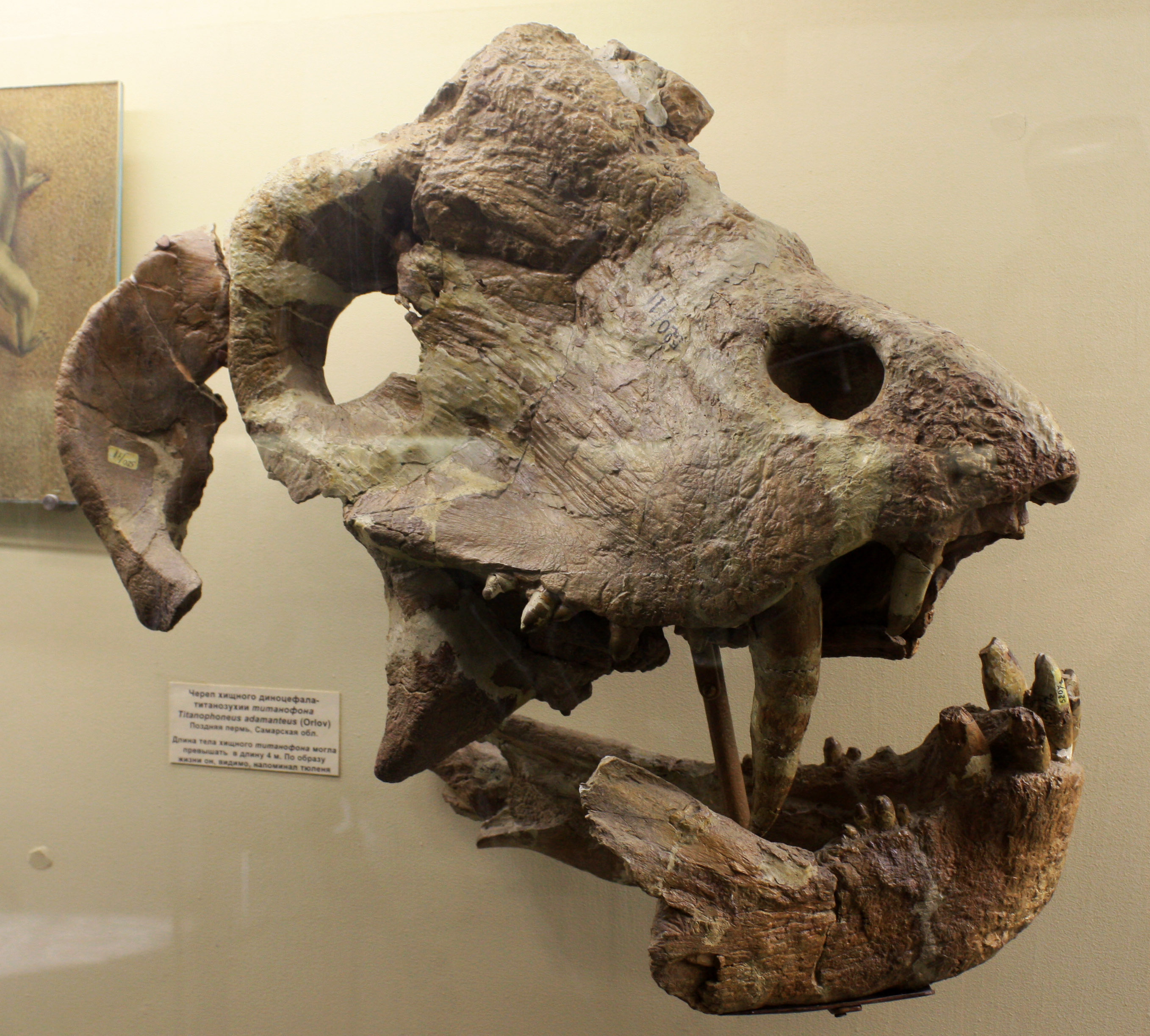
- Skull of T. adamanteus

Scientific classification
- Kingdom: Animalia
- Phylum: Chordata
- Clade: Synapsida
- Clade: Therapsida
- Suborder: †Dinocephalia
- Family: †Anteosauridae
- Subfamily: †Anteosaurinae
- Genus: †Titanophoneus; Efremov, 1938

Type species
- †Titanophoneus potens Efremov, 1938

Species
- Titanophoneus potens Efremov, 1938; Titanophoneus adamanteus Orlov, 1958

Synonyms
- Genus-level: Doliosaurus Orlov, 1956; Doliosauriscus Orlov, 1958; Admetophoneus(?) Efremov, 1954; Species-level T. potens: Doliosaurus yanshinovii Orlov, 1956; T. adamanteus: Doliosaurus adamanteus Orlov, 1958

= Titanophoneus =

Titanophoneus Temporal range: Guadalupian (Wordian to Capitanian) ~266–262 Ma

Extinct genus of therapsids

Titanophoneus ("titanic murderer") is an extinct genus of carnivorous dinocephalian therapsid from the Middle Permian. The type species of the genus is Titanophoneus potens. Titanophoneus was a member of the clade of basal dinocephalians known as Anteosauria, comprising the single family Anteosauridae. With a skull length of 50 cm (20 in), T. potens was one of the largest terrestrial predators of the Permian. Phylogenetic models recover Titanophoneus to being closely related to the larger Anteosaurus, with both being members of Anteosaurinae subfamily. Remains of both species of Titanophoneus have been found in the Isheevo Assemblage Zone of Isheevo, Russia.

It, along with Syodon, were the last anteosaurs in Eastern Europe, as the clade was absent in the following Sundyr Assemblage, being replaced by large therocephalians.

== Classification ==
Titanophoneus potens was named by Efremov in 1938 and was briefly described based on two skulls and associated postcrania. Despite the difference sizes of the skulls, he considered them to be members of the same species.

Initially, it has been hypothesized by experts that estemmenosuchids were the most basal of the dinocephalians, however more recent analysis have instead recovered anteosaurs as the basal dinocephalians.

Kamerrer (2011) performed the first phylogenetic analysis which included all anteosaurid taxa. Along with other subsequent phylogenetic analysis of anteosaurs, this study recovered a monophyletic Anteosauridae containing two major clades, Syodontinae and Anteosaurinae: in Kammerer's analysis, the Chinese Sinophoneus is the most basal anteosaurine and the sister group of an unresolved trichotomy including T. potens, T. adamanteus, and Anteosaurus. The following cladogram is based on Kammerer (2011):

- Therapsida
  - Dinocephalia
    - Anteosauria
      - - Anteosaurinae
          - - Anteosaurus magnificus
            - Titanophoneus adamanteus
            - Titanophoneus potens
          - Sinophoneus yumenensis
        - Syodontinae
          - - Syodon biarmicum
            - Australosyodon nyaphuli
          - Notosyodon gusevi
      - Archaeosyodon praeventor
      - Microsyodon orlovi
    - Tapinocephalia
      - Tapinocaninus pamelae
      - Estemmenosuchus mirabilis
  - Biarmosuchus tener

Following the discovery of the Brazilian anteosaur Pampaphoneus, Cisneros et al. presented another cladogram confirming the recognition of Syodontinae and Anteosaurinae. In the Fig. 2. cladogram of the main paper (which does not include Microsyodon), T. adamanteus is recovered as the sister taxon of a clade composed of T. potens and Anteosaurus. However, in the four cladograms within the supplementary material/supporting information of this paper, (which included Microsyodon), Anteosaurus is recovered as the sister taxon of both species of Titanophoneus. These four cladograms differ only by the position of Microsyodon within the matrix. The following cladograms are those from Cisneros et al. (2012); the first is from the main article, which excludes the genus Microsyodon:

- Therapsida
  - Biarmosuchus tener
  - Dinocephalia
    - - Estemmenosuchus uralensis
      - - Ulemosaurus svijagensis
        - Tapinocaninus pamelae
    - Anteosauridae
      - Archaeosyodon praeventor
      - - Anteosaurinae
          - Sinophoneus yumenensis
          - - Titanophoneus adamanteus
            - - Titanophoneus potens
              - Anteosaurus magnificus
        - Syodontinae
          - Pampaphoneus biccai
          - - Notosyodon gusevi
            - - Syodon biarmicum
              - Australosyodon nyaphuli

When resdescribing the Chinese anteosaur Sinophoneus, Jun Lui presented a new cladogram in which Sinophoneus is recovered as the most basal Anteosauridae and so excluded from Anteosaurinae. Anteosaurus was still recovered as the sister-taxon of Titanophoneus. The following cladogram is based on Jun Liu (2013):

- Therapsida
  - Biarmosuchus tener
  - Dinocephalia
    - - Estemmenosuchus uralensis
      - - Ulemosaurus svijagensis
        - Tapinocaninus pamelae
    - Anteosauridae
      - Sinophoneus yumenensis
      - - Archaeosyodon praeventor
        - - Anteosaurinae
            - Anteosaurus magnificus
            - - Titanophoneus adamanteus
              - Titanophoneus potens
          - Syodontinae
            - Pampaphoneus biccai
            - - Notosyodon gusevi
              - - Syodon biarmicum
                - - Australosyodon nyaphuli
                  - Microsyodon orlovi

== Description ==
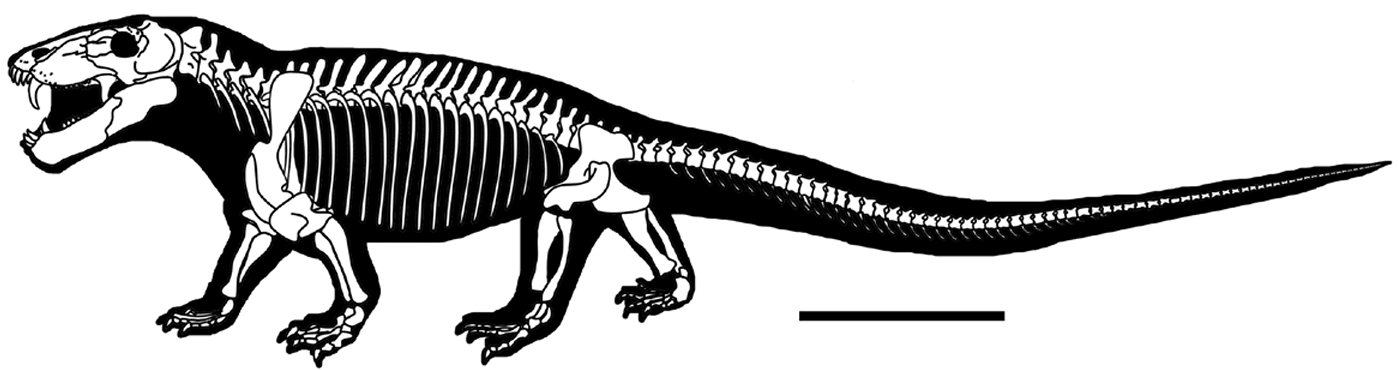
Skeletal diagram

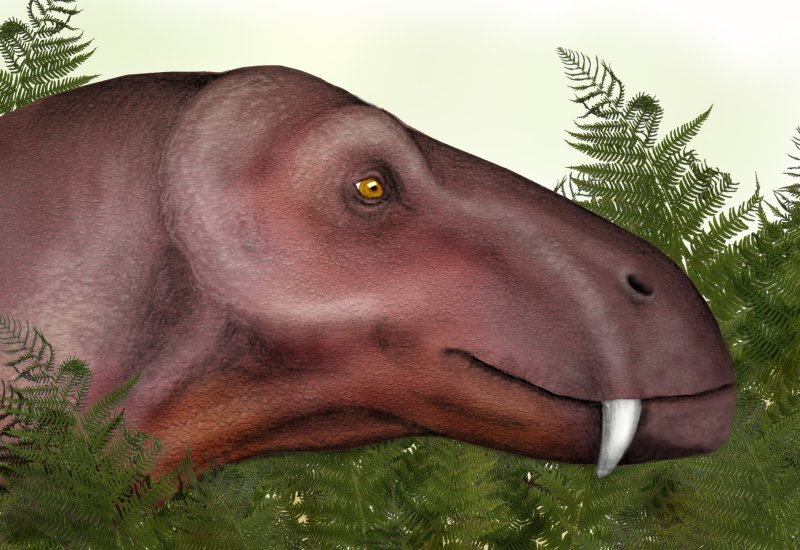
Head reconstruction of Titanophoneus

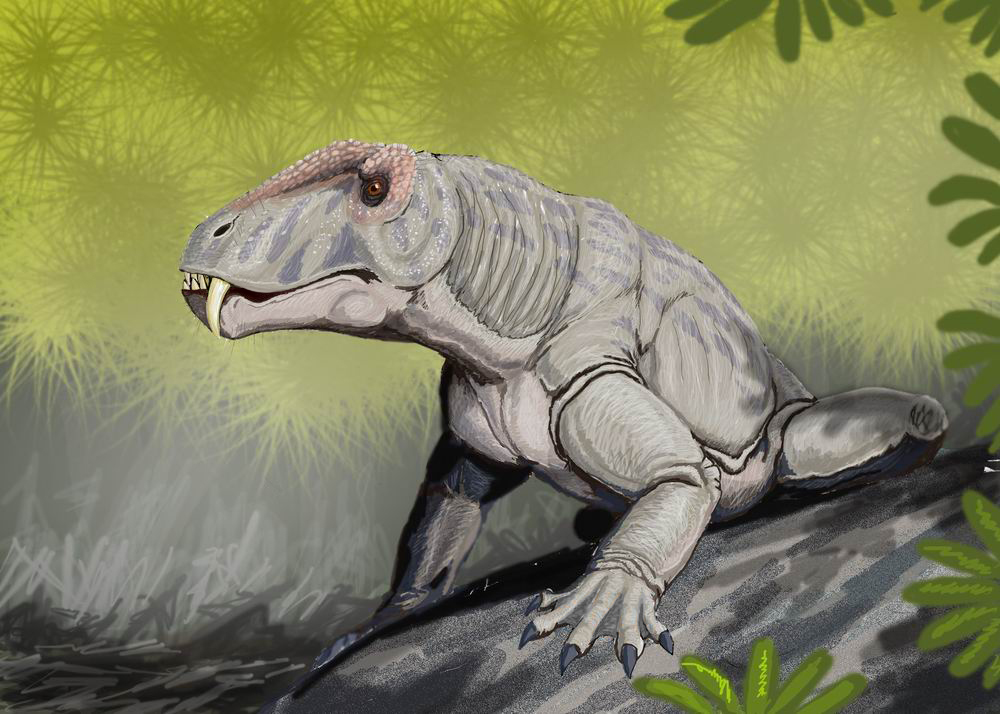
Life reconstruction of Titanophoneus in its environment

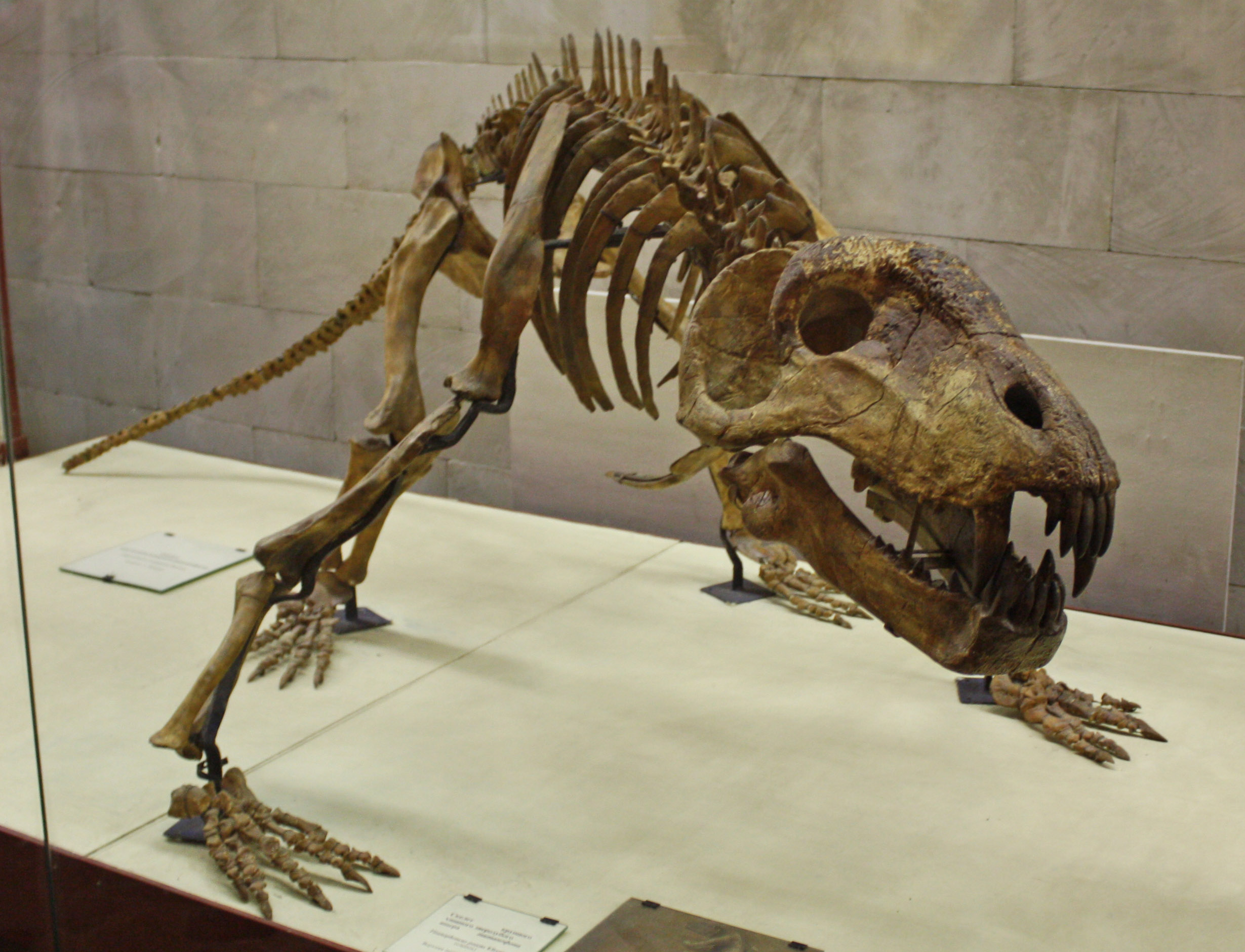
Mounted skeleton of T. potens

Size comparison of T. potens compared to a human

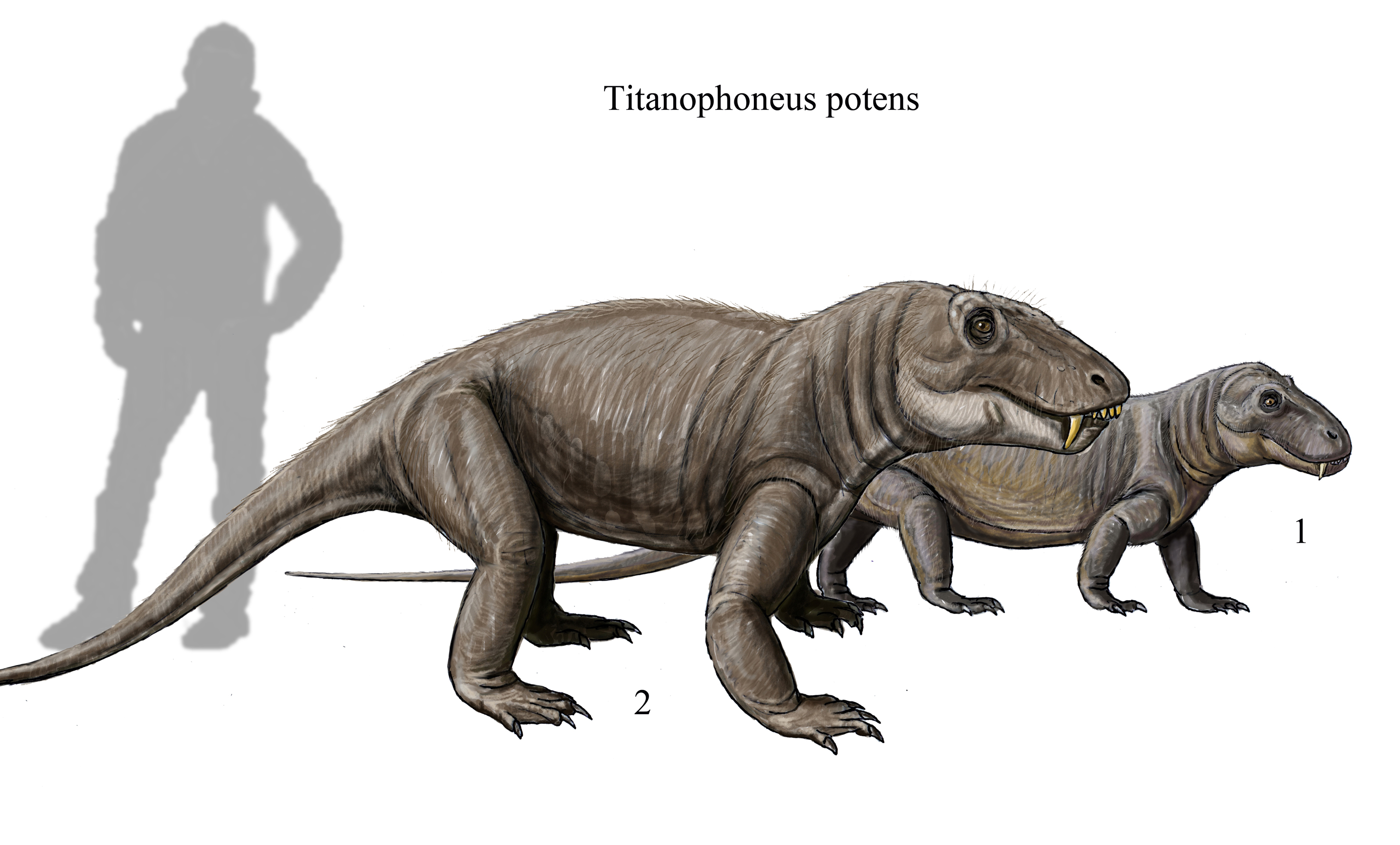
Size comparison between a subadult and an adult T. potens

Titanophoneus, as well as Anteosaurus, were the largest known anteosaurs and are considered to be largest known terrestrial predators of the Permian period. Subadult specimens of T. potens have a skull length of 41 cm (16 in), while adult specimens had a skull length of 50 cm (20 in). T. adamanteus was similar in size to T. potens with an estimated skull length of 50–55 cm (20–22 in). Both species can be distinguished from most anteosaurs by the presence of an angular boss, concave dorsal snout profile, massive pachyostosis of the dorsal surface of the skull, and concave alveolar margin of the precanine region. It can be distinguished from Anteosaurus by the lack of postfrontal horns and lenticular shape of the angular boss. T. adamanteus can be distinguished from T. potens by its relatively larger palatine bosses and distinctive angular boss morphology. with a more elongated anterior process and smooth texture.

== Paleobiology ==
=== Predatory behavior ===
In his 1955 paper, Boonstra indicated that anteosaurs had a crawling locomotion similar to crocodiles, based mostly on their hip joint and femur morphology, useful in a semiaquatic setting and were mainly scavengers. However, paleoneurology of the closely related Anteosaurus disproves the idea that these anteosaurs were sluggish scavengers. X-ray imaging and 3-D reconstructions showcase that Anteosaurus were fast, agile animals in spite of their great size: the inner ears were larger than those of its closest relatives and competitors, suggesting that Anteosaurus was well-suited to the role of an apex predator that could outrun both its rivals and prey alike. The area of its brain responsible for coordinating the movements of the eyes with the head was also determined to have been exceptionally large, an important feature to ensure that they could track their prey accurately. Analysis on the eye sockets and scleral rings suggests T. potens was mesopic or scotopic suggesting it was active in during low light conditions or a nocturnal predator.

=== Diet ===
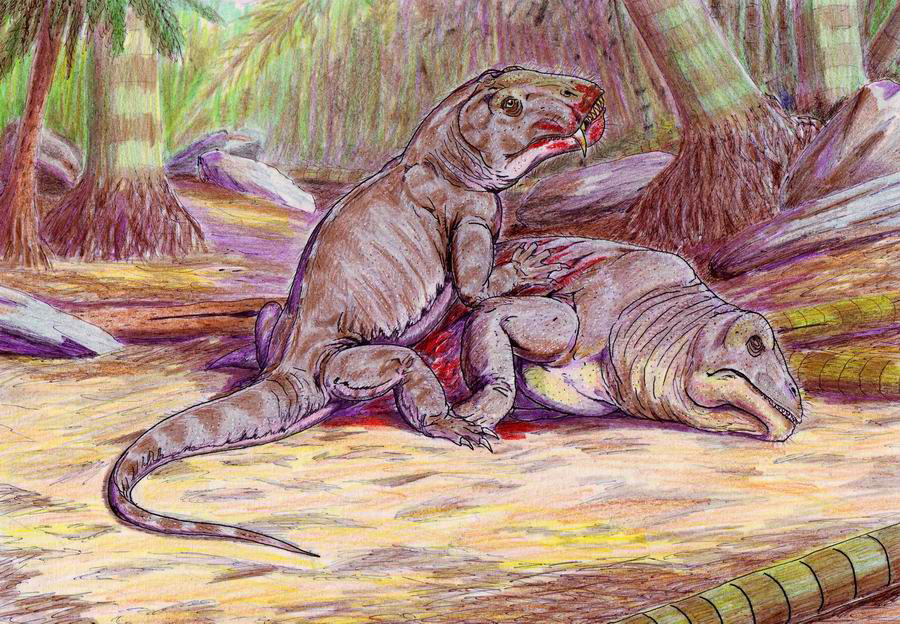
Reconstruction of a T. potens feasting on a Ulemosaurus

In 2008 Mikhail Ivakhnenko analyzed a vast majority of Permian therapsid skulls, and suggested that anteosaurs, were semiaquatic piscivorous (fish-eating) synapsids, mostly similar to modern-day otters. Christian F. Kammerer in 2011 questioned this proposal, given that numerous anatomical traits of anteosaurs make this lifestyle unlikely. The typical dentition of piscivorous animals include elongate, numerous, strongly recurved, and very sharp teeth in order to hold and kill fast-moving fish prey. In addition, the jaws of piscivores are commonly elongated and narrow for greater strike speed and minimal water resistance when capturing prey. In contrast, the skull morphology of most anteosaurs—specifically anteosaurines—is extremely robust with deep jaws, and the teeth are bulbous and blunt, with only the canines being significantly recurved. He also noted that the teeth of anteosaurine are mostly similar to that of large tyrannosaurids (postcanines robust bases, faceted surfaces, and obliquely angled serrations), whose dentition is interpreted as being specialized for bone-crunching. Accordingly, bone-crunching may also have been employed by anteosaurids, being an important component in their diet.

== Paleoecology ==
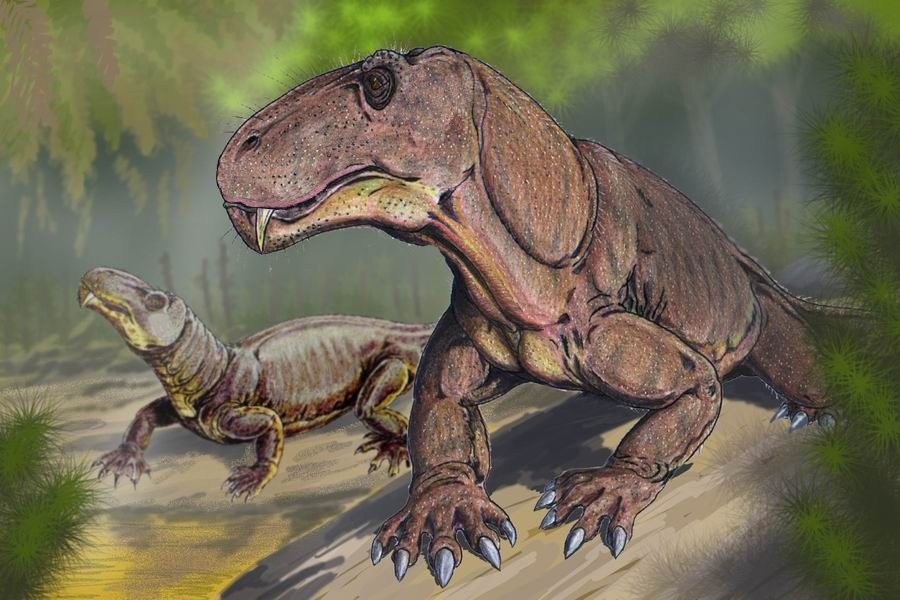
Life reconstruction of a pair of Titanophoneus

Both species of Titanophoneus were recovered in the Isheevo Assemblage Zone. Contemporary dinocephalians included anteosaurs such as syodontine Syodon, the tapinocephalians include the tapinocephalid Ulemosaurus svijagensis and the deuterosaurid Deuterosaurus. Therocephalians were represented by Porosteognathus efremovi and Perplexisaurus lepusculus.

The Isheevo Assemblage Zone was part of the Dinocephalian tetrapod fauna, dating from middle the Wordian to the middle Capitanian stage of the Middle Permian. The assemblage zone succeed the Ocher Assemblage and preceded the Sundry Assemblage, which was the last assemblage before the Capitanian mass extinction. Anteosaurs were absent in the Sundry Assemblage, being replaced by large basal therocephalians such as Gorynychus and Julognathus.

== See also ==
- Anteosauria
- Anteosaurus
