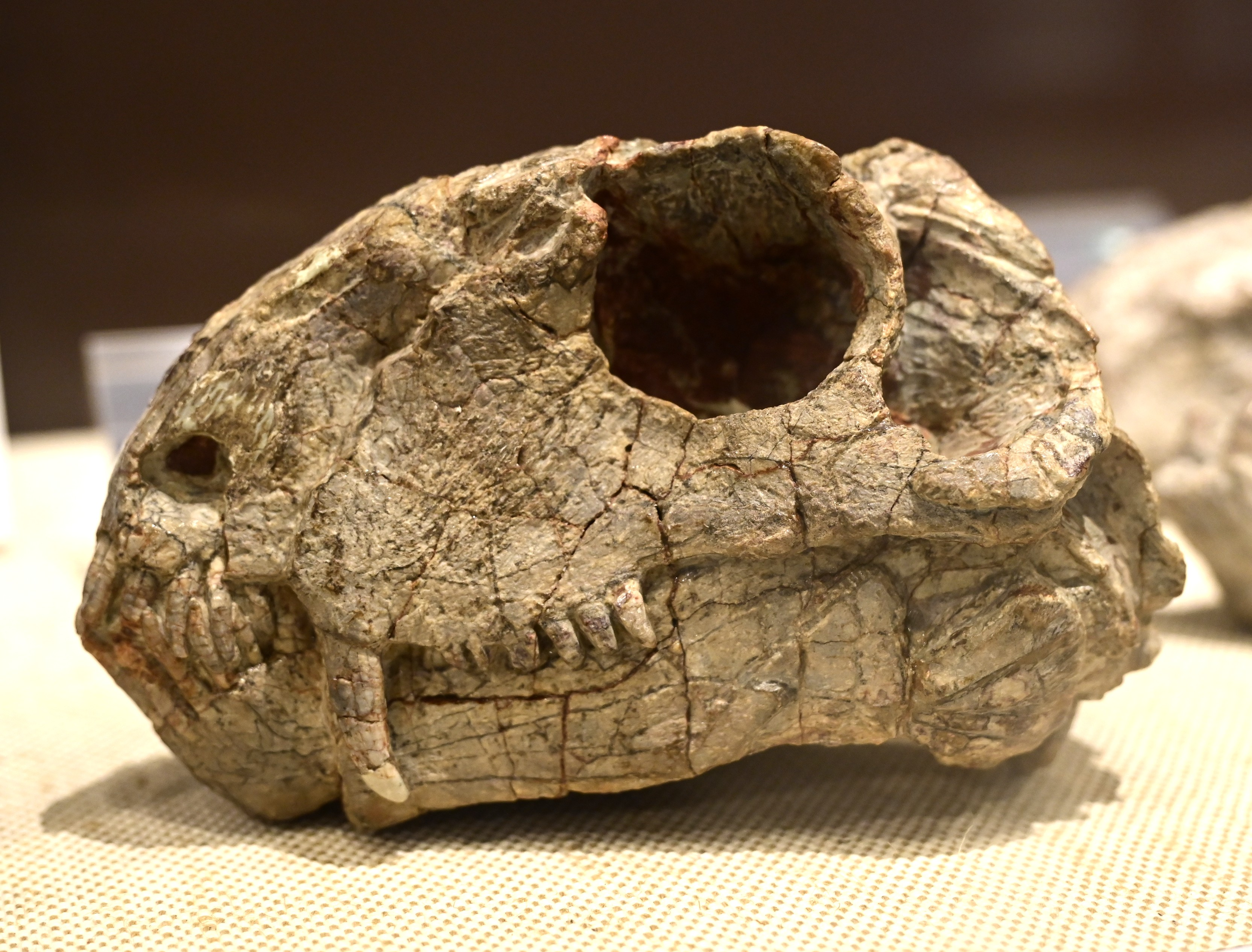
- Skull, Paleozoological Museum of China

Scientific classification
- Kingdom: Animalia
- Phylum: Chordata
- Clade: Synapsida
- Clade: Therapsida
- Suborder: †Dinocephalia
- Family: †Anteosauridae
- Genus: †Sinophoneus; Cheng and Ji, 1996
- Species: †S. yumenensis

Binomial name
- †Sinophoneus yumenensis Cheng and Ji, 1996

Synonyms
- Stenocybus acidentatus Cheng and Li, 1997

= Sinophoneus =

Sinophoneus Temporal range: Middle Permian (Roadian), 272–270 Ma

Extinct genus of therapsids

Sinophoneus (meaning "Chinese murderer") is an extinct genus of carnivorous dinocephalian therapsid belonging to the family Anteosauridae. It lived 272 to 270 million years ago at the beginning of the Middle Permian (Lower Roadian) in what is now the Gansu Province in northern China. It is known by a skull of an adult individual (the holotype GMV1601), as well as by many skulls of juvenile specimens. The latter were first considered as belonging to a different animal, named Stenocybus, before being reinterpreted as immature Sinophoneus.

Sinophoneus shows a combination of characters present in other anteosaurs. Its bulbous profile snout and external nostrils located in front of the canine are reminiscent of the basal anteosaur Archaeosyodon, while its massive transverse pterygoids processes with enlarged distal ends are more similar to the more derived anteosaurs Anteosaurus and Titanophoneus. First phylogenetic analyzes identified Sinophoneus as the most basal Anteosaurinae. A more recent analysis positioned it outside the Anteosaurinae and Syodontinae subclades, and recovers it as the most basal Anteosauridae.

== History ==
=== Synonymy with Stenocybus ===
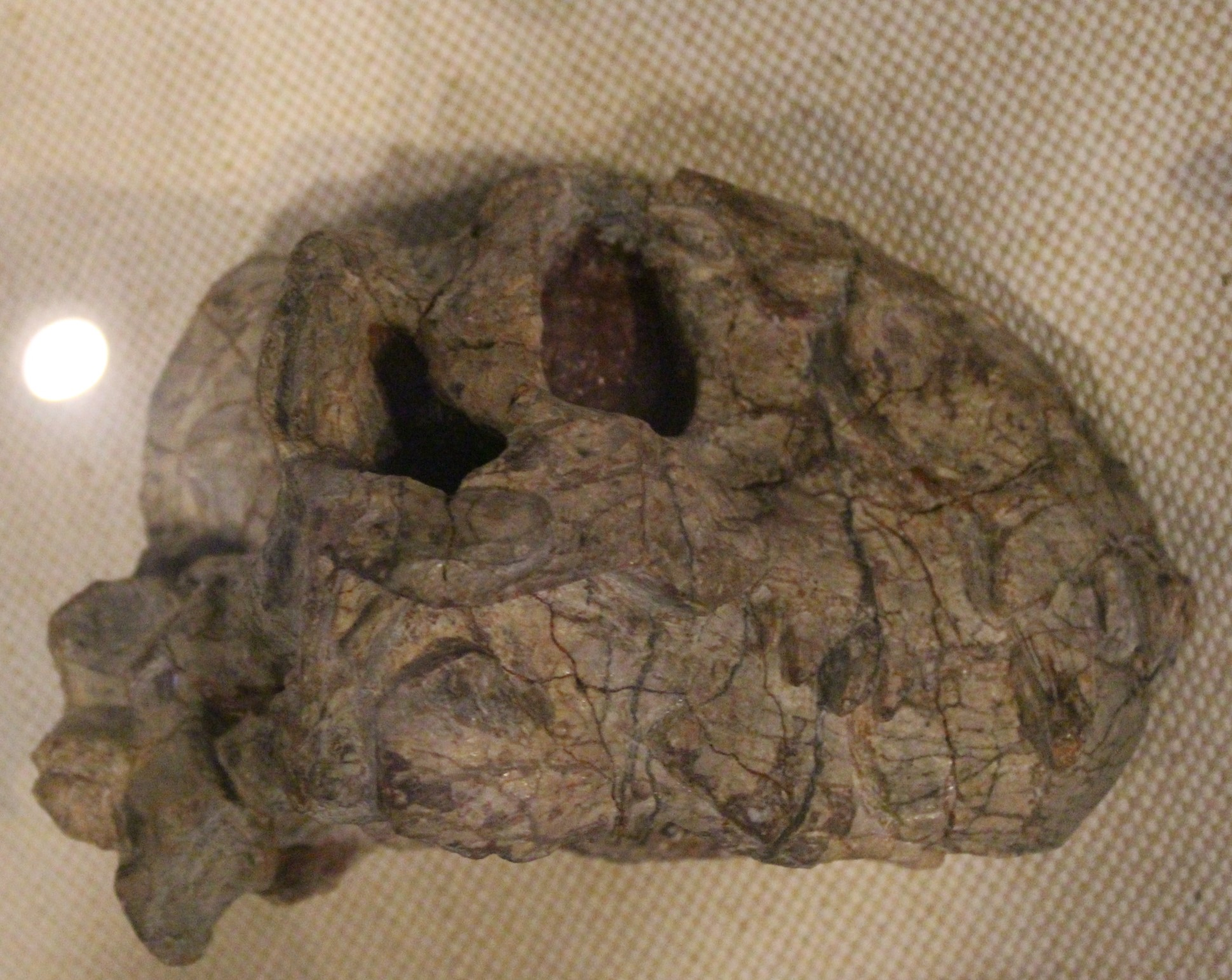
Another skull

In 1997, Cheng & Li described the small dinocephalian Stenocybus acidentatus, from a complete skull (IGCAGS V 361) and jaw remains from a second specimen, found in the same site as Sinophoneus. Although in their article, Cheng and Li did not compare Stenocybus directly with Sinophoneus, they consider the first sufficiently different from Anteosauridae to place it in a new family, the Stenocybusidae. The name of this clade was later correctly modified in Stenocybidae by the Russian paleontologist Mikhail Feodosievich Ivakhnenko. The latter was also the first researcher to suggest that Stenocybus could be the juvenile form of Sinophoneus. In 2011, Christian Kammerer also considered Stenocybus as a young Sinophoneus, the proportions of the first (absence of pachyostosis, tall and narrow skull, relatively large orbits, and smaller temporal fenestra) being typical characters of juvenile therapids. In addition, the immature skull of Stenocybus already shows a beginning of the median ridge of the snout characteristic of Sinophoneus, as well as the same bulbous profile of the snout as in the latter. As a result, Kammerer regards Stenocybus acidentatus as a junior synonym of Sinophoneus yumenensis. A conclusion shared by Liu and Li from new specimens mentioned in a short note published the same year.

In 2014, Jiang and Ji described two new specimens of Stenocybus: a snout with articulated jaws, and a right dentary with an almost complete dentition, belonging to two individuals slightly larger than the holotype. Although providing new information on the anatomy of the animal, such as the number of teeth on the mandible, Jiang and Ji believe that the phylogenetic position of Stenocybus remains difficult to confirm, and that the synonymy of Stenocybus with Sinophoneus proposed by Kammerer, Liu and Li must be proved by the discovery of more complete specimens. However, Jiang and Ji's wishes had been realize a few months earlier. In 2013 Liu described the seven new skulls of Sinophoneus (including one associated with postcranial remains) that had only been mentioned in the short note of 2011. These skulls all belong to specimens smaller than the holotype, but they represent various ontogenetic stages. They confirm that the skulls of Stenocybus actually represent several juvenile stages of Sinophoneus.

== Description ==
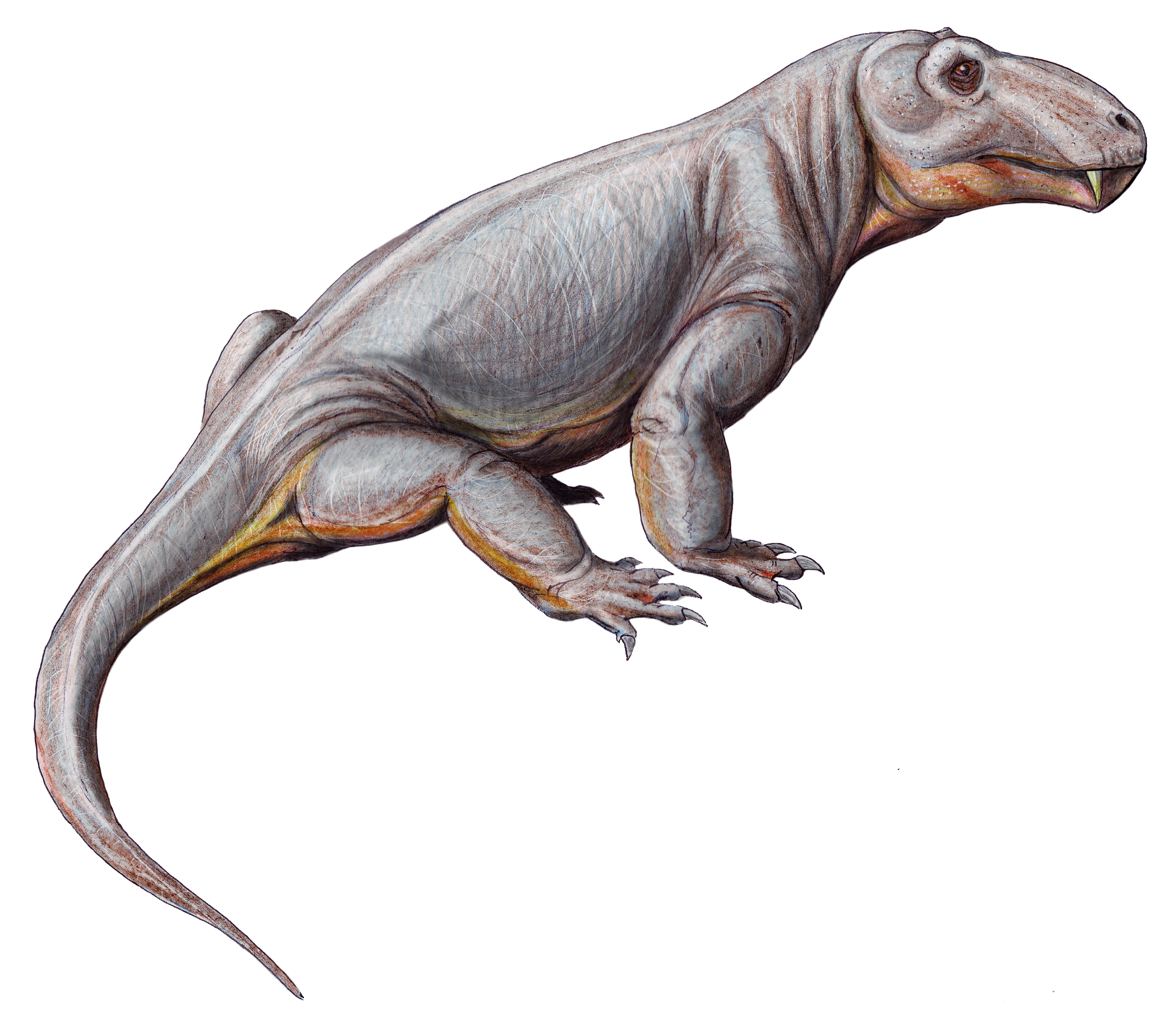
Life restoration of adult

The holotype of Sinophoneus is a somewhat dorsoventrally deformed skull measuring 32 cm in length from the tip of the snout to the occipital condyle and about 35 cm in total length to the posterior border of the squamosal. The upper part of the orbits is crushed, giving them an oval shape. They had to be originally circular. Most of the temporal arches are missing, as is the dentition of the upper jaws. The lower jaw is not preserved. The skull is mainly characterized by the presence of a median ridge starting between the eye sockets (where it is poorly developed) and extending to the tip of the snout (where it is more robust) which it protrudes beyond in dorsal view. The nostrils are smaller than in other anteosaurs. As in Archaeosyodon, the nostrils are entirely located in front of the upper canine whereas in other anteosaurs they are mainly located above or behind the canine. The snout profile is bulbous as in Archaeosyodon. The transverse processes of the pterygoids have a very enlarged distal end giving them a palmate morphology in ventral view as in Anteosaurus and Titanophoneus.

== Classification and phylogeny ==
In 2011 Christian Kammerer published the first phylogenetic analysis including all anteosaurs. This one recognized the monophyly of Anteosauridae, which contain two main clades: Syodontinae and Anteosaurinae. Sinophoneus is identified as the most basal Anteosaurinae and is the sister group of an unresolved trichotomy including Titanophoneus potens, T. adamanteus and Anteosaurus.

Below, the cladogram of the anteosaurs presented by Kammerer in 2011 :

- Therapsida
  - Dinocephalia
    - Anteosauria
      - - Anteosaurinae
          - - Anteosaurus magnificus
            - Titanophoneus adamanteus
            - Titanophoneus potens
          - Sinophoneus yumenensis
        - Syodontinae
          - - Syodon biarmicum
            - Australosyodon nyaphuli
          - Notosyodon gusevi
      - Archaeosyodon praeventor
      - Microsyodon orlovi
    - Tapinocephalia
      - Tapinocaninus pamelae
      - Estemmenosuchus mirabilis
  - Biarmosuchus tener

In describing the new Brazilian anteosaur Pampaphoneus, Cisneros et al. presented another cladogram confirming the recognition of the clades Anteosaurinae and Syodontinae. Sinophoneus occupies the same position there as in the cladogram proposed by Kammerer.

The cladogram of Cisneros et al. published in the main paper and excluding the genus Microsyodon.

- Therapsida
  - Biarmosuchus tener
  - Dinocephalia
    - - Estemmenosuchus uralensis
      - - Ulemosaurus svijagensis
        - Tapinocaninus pamelae
    - Anteosauridae
      - Archaeosyodon praeventor
      - - Anteosaurinae
          - Sinophoneus yumenensis
          - - Titanophoneus adamanteus
            - - Titanophoneus potens
              - Anteosaurus magnificus
        - Syodontinae
          - Pampaphoneus biccai
          - - Notosyodon gusevi
            - - Syodon biarmicum
              - Australosyodon nyaphuli

One of the four cladograms of Cisneros et al. published in the Supporting Information of the same article, and including Microsyodon.

- Therapsida
  - Biarmosuchus
  - Dinocephalia
    - - Estemmenosuchus
      - - Ulemosaurus
        - Tapinocaninus
    - Anteosauridae
      - Archaeosyodon
      - - Anteosaurinae
          - Sinophoneus
          - - Anteosaurus
            - - T. potens
              - T. adamanteus
        - Syodontinae
          - Pampaphoneus
          - - Notosyodon
            - - Syodon
              - - Microsyodon
                - Australosyodon

In 2013, Jun Lui presented a new cladogram in which Sinophoneus is reinterpreted as the most basal anteosauridae and is thus excluded from Anteosaurinae.

The cladogram published by Jun Liu in 2013 :

- Therapsida
  - Biarmosuchus tener
  - Dinocephalia
    - - Estemmenosuchus uralensis
      - - Ulemosaurus svijagensis
        - Tapinocaninus pamelae
    - Anteosauridae
      - Sinophoneus yumenensis
      - - Archaeosyodon praeventor
        - - Anteosaurinae
            - Anteosaurus magnificus
            - - Titanophoneus adamanteus
              - Titanophoneus potens
          - Syodontinae
            - Pampaphoneus biccai
            - - Notosyodon gusevi
              - - Syodon biarmicum
                - - Australosyodon nyaphuli
                  - Microsyodon orlovi

== Paleobiology ==
=== Ontogeny ===
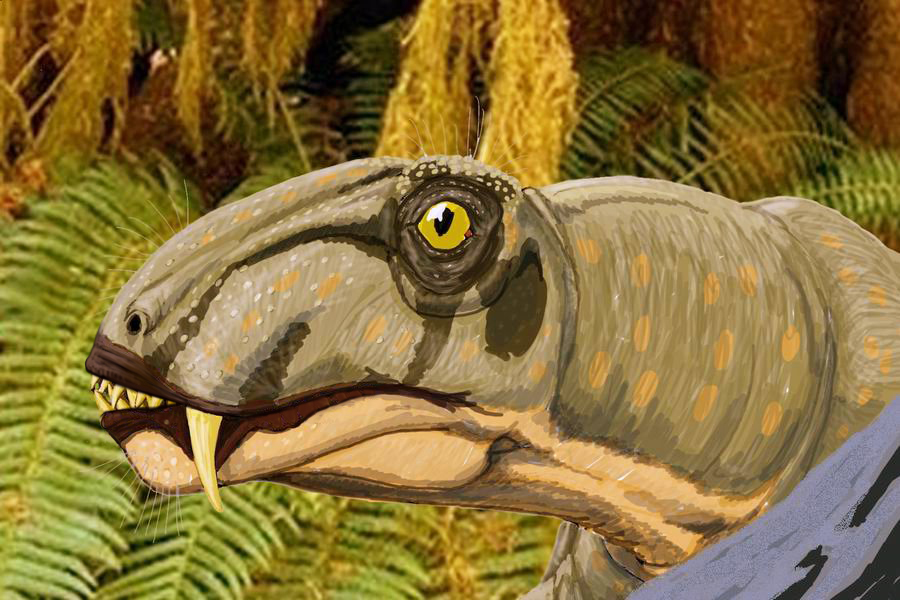
Illustration of a juvenile Sinophoneus based on the IGCAGS V 361 specimen which was the holotype of Stenocybus acidentatus.

The ontogenetic series of the genus Sinophoneus is incomplete with an unrepresented size range between the known juvenile skulls measuring between 12 and 18 cm in length and the only known adult skull measuring 32 cm. However, this ontogenetic series makes it possible to identify the important morphological changes between the juveniles and the adults of this genus. The skull of the juvenile is relatively tall and narrow, and pachyostosis is absent. In the adult, the skull becomes much wider and lower, notably the bones of the palate which widen considerably, and a pachyostosis is observed on the bones surrounding the orbits. The medial ridge on the skull roof is weak in the smallest known specimen, but a pair of bosses is present on the midline of the inter-orbital region. This ridge extends from the pineal foramen to a point slightly beyond the orbit in the juvenile. It is more pronounced in adults where it extends to the end of the snout that ends prominently. The nostrils and orbits increase only slightly in size during growth. In contrast, the dimensions of the temporal fenestrae increase dramatically. They are triangular in shape and much smaller than orbit in the smaller specimens, have a size close to that of the orbits in somewhat larger specimens, and are much larger than the orbit in the adult. The latter were therefore equipped with a mandibular adductor musculature much more developed than that of the juveniles, and could inflict proportionally much more powerful bites. These differences indicate that in Sinophoneus, juveniles and adults occupied distinct ecological niches and did not covet the same prey. This pattern is also known in the South African genus Anteosaurus.

== Paleoenvironment ==
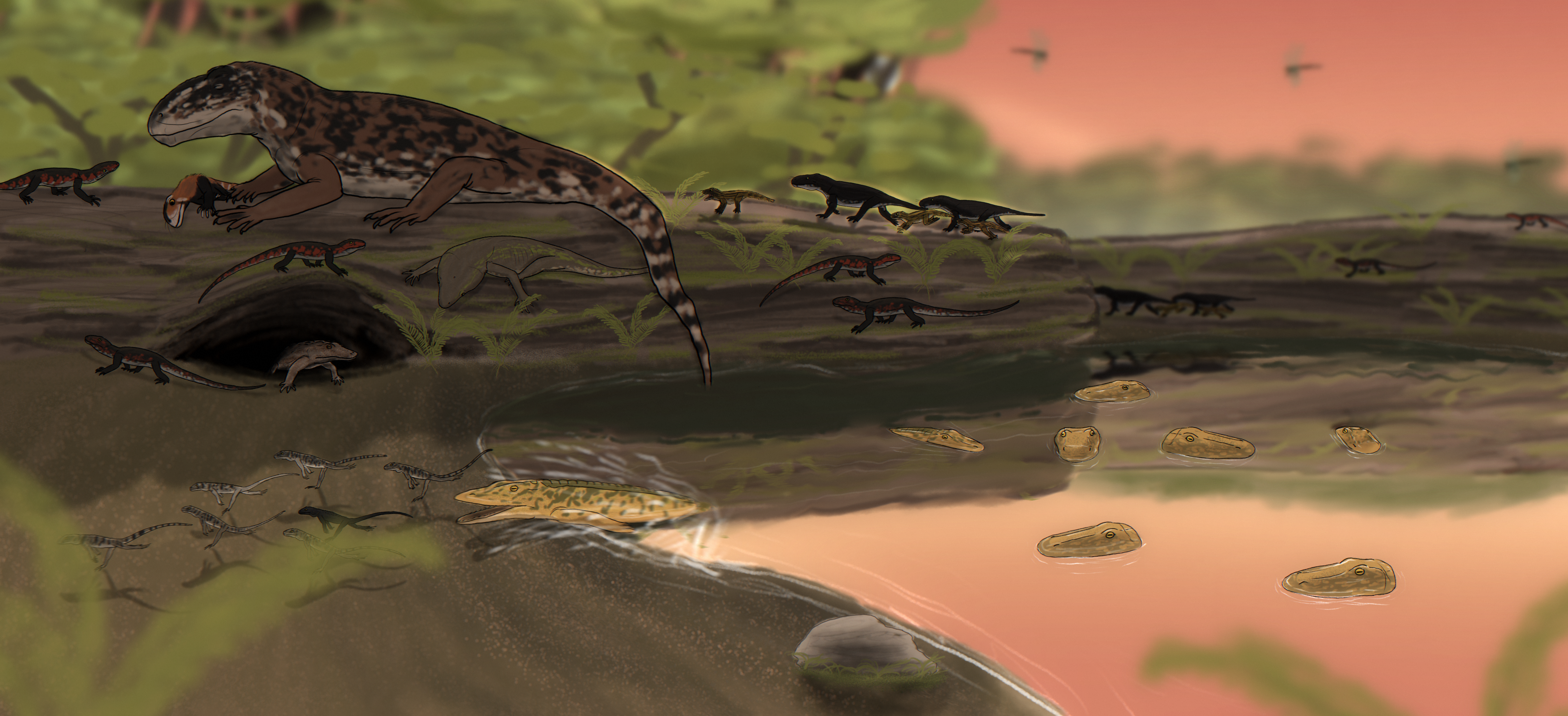
Paleoart of the fauna and paleoenvironment of Qingtoushan Formation

All fossils of Sinophoneus come from a single locality, the Dashankou site, near Yumen City, in western Gansu Province, China. Stratigraphically, they belong to the Qingtoushan Formation (which before 2012 was called the Xidagou Formation), whose sediments are of fluvial origin. No radiometric dating is known for the Qingtoushan Formation, but Liu et al. assigns it a lower Roadian age (lowermost Middle Permian), thus partially filling the Olson Gap. The latter corresponds to a period of time with a poor fossil record, located between the lower Permian, dominated by the pelycosaurs, and the mid-middle Permian (Wordian), where the therapids take the first place in terrestrial ecosystems. The Roadian age attributed to the Qingtoushan Formation is an estimate derived from the degree of evolution of the Dashankou fauna. This fauna is composed both of animals belonging to ancient lineages, rather typical of Upper Carboniferous and Lower Permian, such as the temnospondyl dissorophoid Anakamacops and the Bolosauridae Belebey, and also of more derived forms, rather typical of the middle and upper Permian, such as the anthracosaurs Chroniosuchidae Ingentidens and Phratochronis, the moradisaurine Gansurhinus, and several therapsids. The latter are, however, exclusively represented by phylogenetically basal taxa. These are Raranimus, the most basal therapsid known to date, and Biseridens, the most basal anomodont. The new classification of Sinophoneus, identified by Liu as the most basal Anteosauridae, is an additional argument in favor of a Roadian age for the Dashankou fauna. Moreover, the latter was correlated with the Russian Parabradysaurus silantjevi assemblage zone of Roadian age. Coinciding with its basal phylogenetic position, the Lower Roadian age of Sinophoneus makes it one of the oldest known anteosaurs to date, together with the Russian genus Microsyodon being of comparable age.
