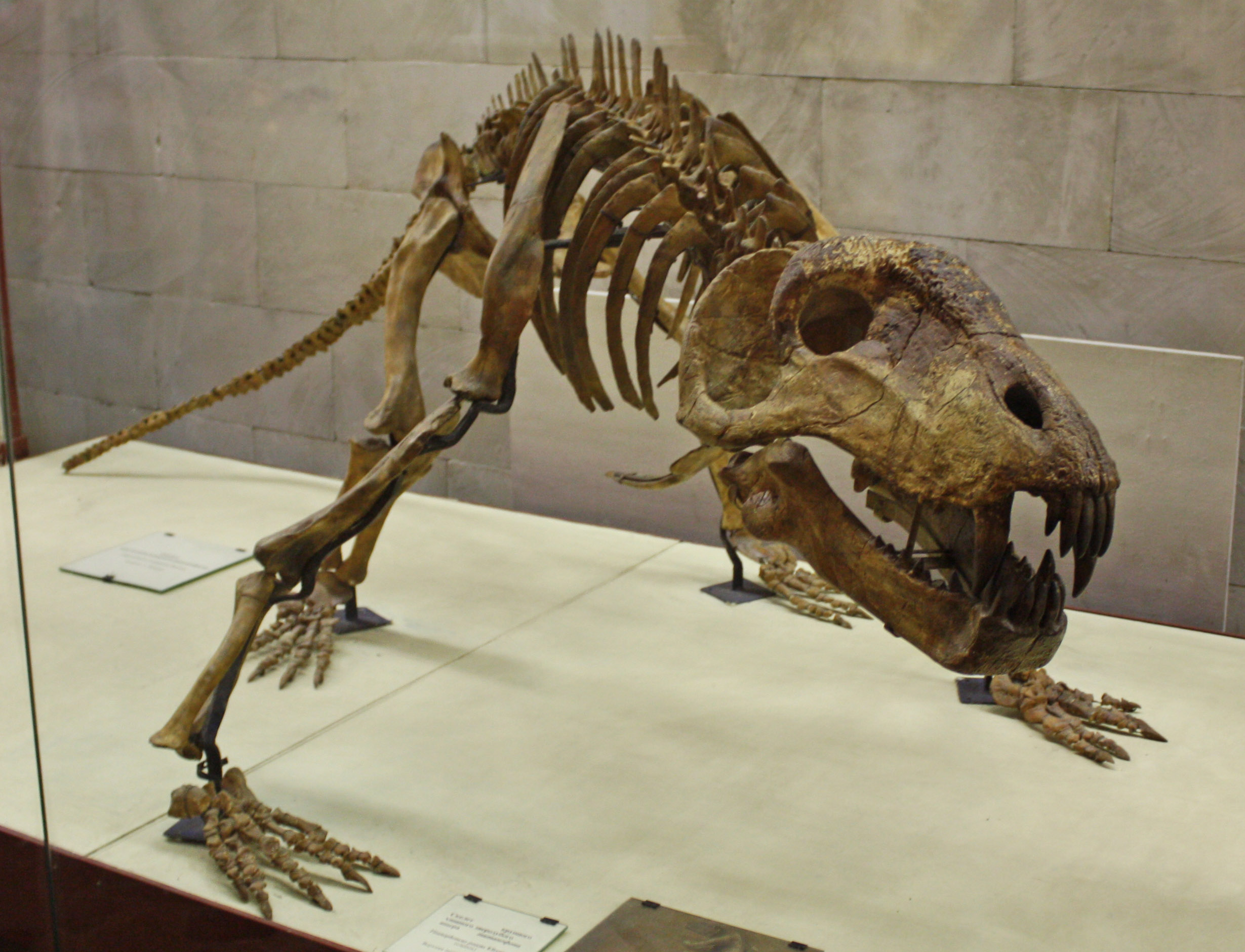
- Skeleton of the anteosaurine Titanophoneus potens

Scientific classification
- Kingdom: Animalia
- Phylum: Chordata
- Clade: Synapsida
- Clade: Therapsida
- Suborder: †Dinocephalia
- Family: †Anteosauridae
- Subfamily: †Anteosaurinae; Boonstra, 1954

Subgroups
- †Anteosaurus; †Titanophoneus

= Anteosaurinae =

Anteosaurinae Temporal range: Middle Permian (Wordian to Capitanian), ~266–260 Ma

Extinct subfamily of therapsids

Anteosaurinae is an extinct subfamily of dinocephalian therapsids. It is one of two subfamilies in the family Anteosauridae, the other being Syodontinae.

== Description ==
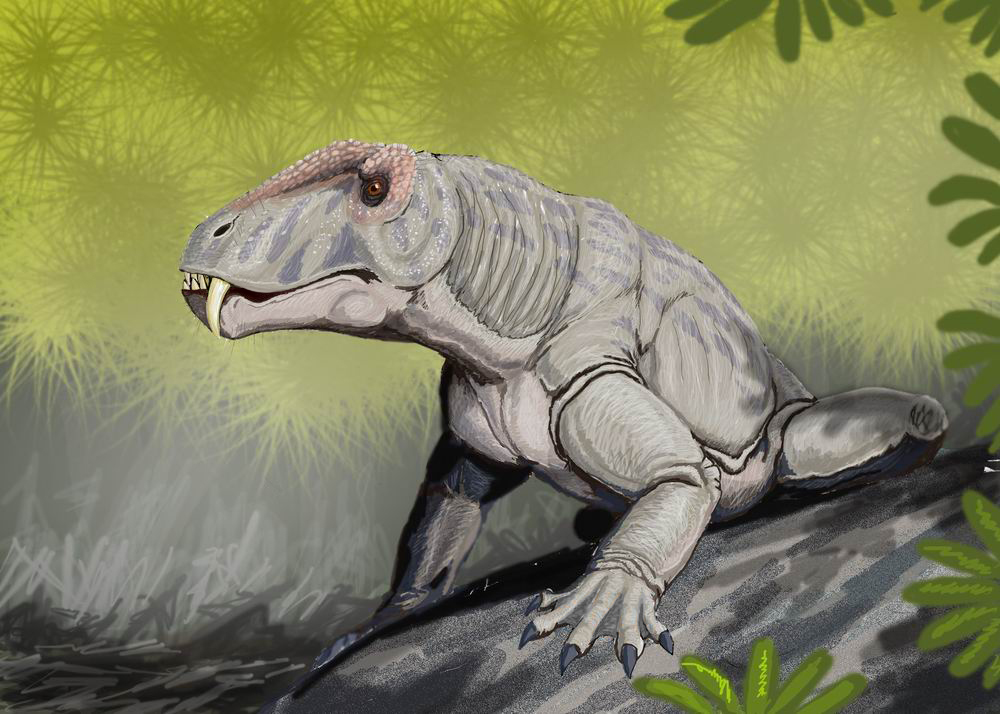
Life reconstruction of Titanophoneus

Anteosaurines are large, specialized anteosaurs. The postcanine teeth are further reduced. Deepening of the postorbital region of the skull (behind the eyes) produced a larger temporal opening, indicating more muscle mass. The boss on the angular (rear of the jaw) has become very prominent, again, another sign of powerful jaw muscles. These huge animals were formidable predators.

Within Anteosaurinae, pachyostosis is taken to extremes. The dorsal (upper) surface of the nasal, frontal, and postfrontals (around and between/above the eyes) is thickened and rugose in the same manner as the tapinocephalids. Nevertheless, these animals are too specialized and too late to have been the ancestors of the herbivorous tapinocephalids, so these characteristics evolved independently.

Boonstra notes that the hip joint and the femur of Anteosaurus are comparable with those of the crocodile and that these animals may have had a crawling habit. Because of the carnivorous dentition, he believes them to have been slinking predators.

== Classification ==
Below is a cladogram showing syodontine relationships from a 2012 phylogenetic study of anteosaurians:

- Therapsida
  - Biarmosuchus tener
  - Dinocephalia
    - - Estemmenosuchus uralensis
      - - Ulemosaurus svijagensis
        - Tapinocaninus pamelae
    - Anteosauridae
      - Archaeosyodon praeventor
      - - Anteosaurinae
          - Sinophoneus yumenensis
          - - Titanophoneus adamanteus
            - - Titanophoneus potens
              - Anteosaurus magnificus
        - Syodontinae
          - Pampaphoneus biccai
          - - Notosyodon gusevi
            - - Syodon biarmicum
              - Australosyodon nyaphuli

However, in the following year Liu reanalyzed Sinophoneus and removed it from anteosaurines, recovering it as the most basal anteosaur.

- Therapsida
  - Biarmosuchus tener
  - Dinocephalia
    - - Estemmenosuchus uralensis
      - - Ulemosaurus svijagensis
        - Tapinocaninus pamelae
    - Anteosauridae
      - Sinophoneus yumenensis
      - - Archaeosyodon praeventor
        - - Anteosaurinae
            - Anteosaurus magnificus
            - - Titanophoneus adamanteus
              - Titanophoneus potens
          - Syodontinae
            - Pampaphoneus biccai
            - - Notosyodon gusevi
              - - Syodon biarmicum
                - - Australosyodon nyaphuli
                  - Microsyodon orlovi
