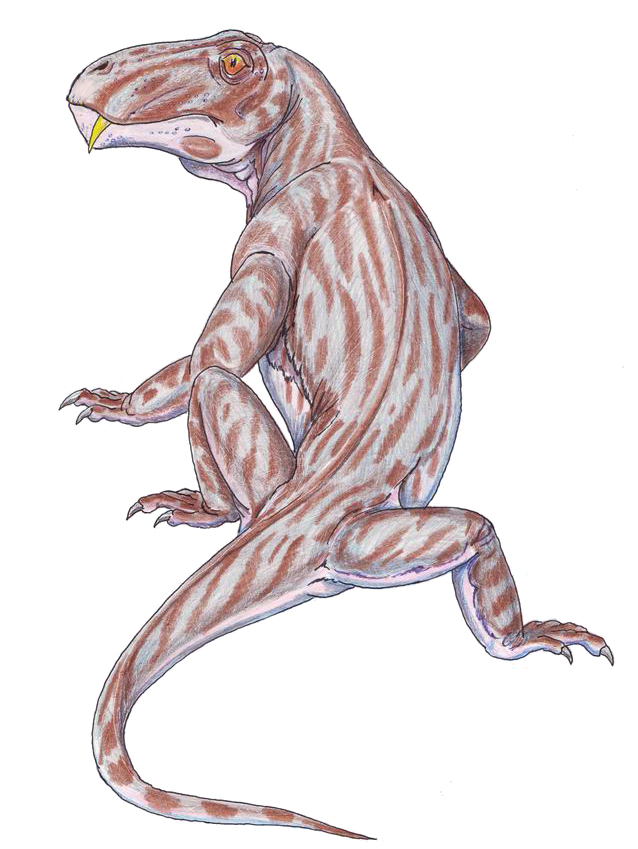
- Life restoration

Scientific classification
- Kingdom: Animalia
- Phylum: Chordata
- Clade: Synapsida
- Clade: Therapsida
- Suborder: †Dinocephalia
- Family: †Anteosauridae
- Genus: †Australosyodon; Rubidge, 1994
- Species: †A. nyaphuli

Binomial name
- †Australosyodon nyaphuli Rubidge, 1994

= Australosyodon =

Australosyodon Temporal range: Middle Permian, 265 Ma

Extinct genus of therapsids

Australosyodon is an extinct genus of dinocephalian therapsids from the middle Permian of South Africa. The first fossil was discovered in the 1980s near the village of Prince Albert Road in the Karoo region of South Africa.

The genus is closely related to the genus Syodon, found in the Russian Ischejewo fauna, and is thus regarded as the earliest example of an anteosaurid Dinocephalia outside of Russia. Australosyodon fossils have been recovered from the Eodicynodon Assemblage Zone, the lowest bank of the South African Beaufort Group, indicating the presence of early therapsids in the Southern Hemisphere. The genus was first described by Bruce S. Rubidge in 1994.

== Description ==
Australosyodon was a medium-sized dinocephalian. The skull was high and narrow, with a length of 26 cm, indicating a total body length of approximately 1.8 m (5.9 ft). The top of the skull displayed the thickening typical of dinocephalians. Overall there are many similarities to the skull of Syodon, although some minor differences in shape and in the extent of pachyostosis are present. The fangs were laterally compressed and featured a rearward-facing central cutting edge. Shape, number and arrangement of teeth are among the characteristics that allow distinguishing Australosyodon from Syodon.

== Classification ==
Australosyodon is regarded as a very primitive anteosaurid dinocephalian and as first-known representative of that group in the southern hemisphere. Like Syodon, Australosyodon lacked the features typical for the more apomorphic members of the anteosauridae, e.g. the boss on the lower mandible found in Anteosaurus or Titanophoneus. These two closely related genera have therefore been combined into a subgenus Syodontinae.

Australosyodon in a cladogram after Cisneros et al. (2012):

- Therapsida
  - Biarmosuchus tener
  - Dinocephalia
    - - Estemmenosuchus uralensis
      - - Ulemosaurus svijagensis
        - Tapinocaninus pamelae
    - Anteosauridae
      - Archaeosyodon praeventor
      - - Anteosaurinae
          - Sinophoneus yumenensis
          - - Titanophoneus adamanteus
            - - Titanophoneus potens
              - Anteosaurus magnificus
        - Syodontinae
          - Pampaphoneus biccai
          - - Notosyodon gusevi
            - - Syodon biarmicum
              - Australosyodon nyaphuli

== See also ==
- List of therapsids
