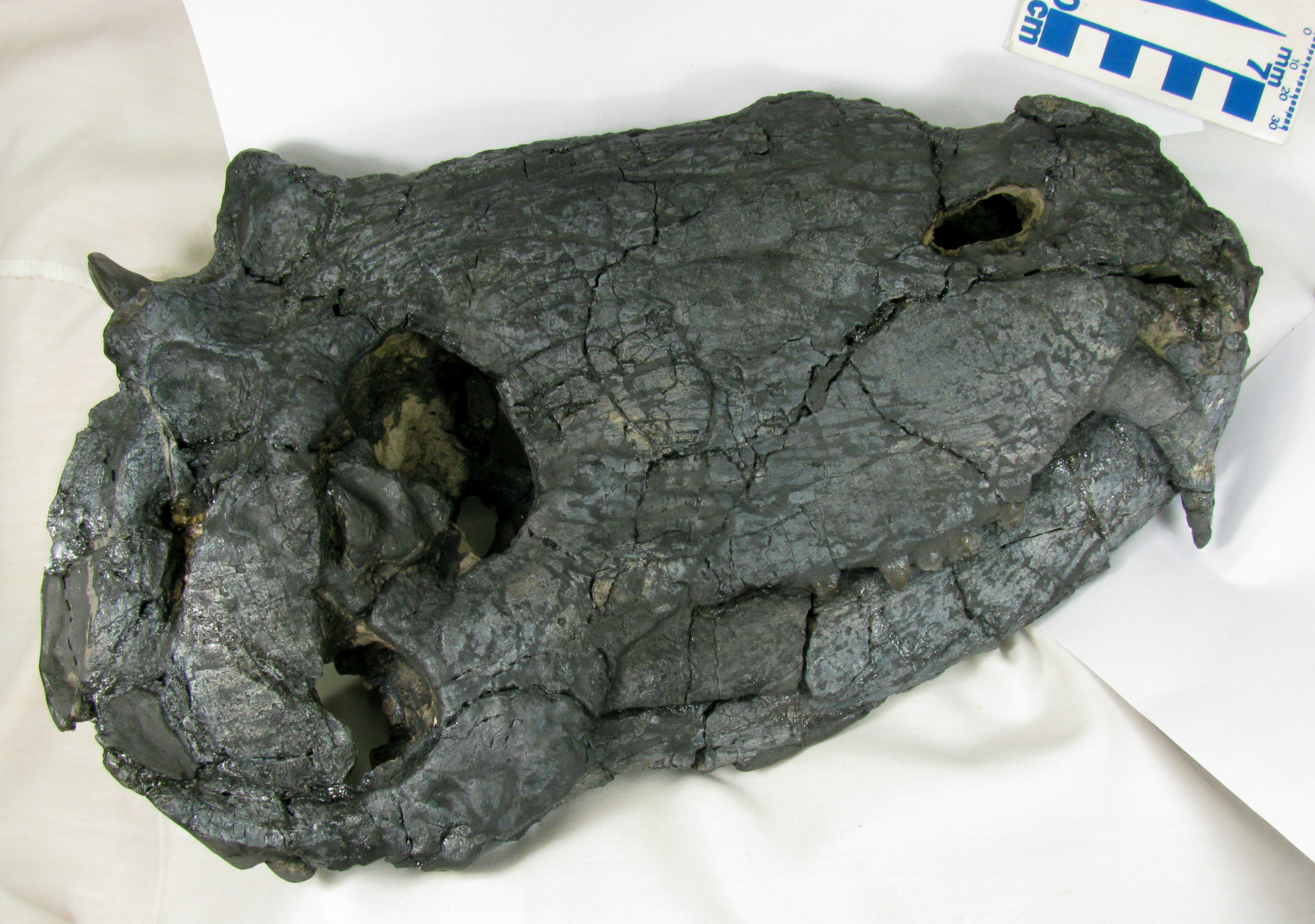
- Pampaphoneus biccai holotype skull

Scientific classification
- Kingdom: Animalia
- Phylum: Chordata
- Clade: Synapsida
- Clade: Therapsida
- Suborder: †Dinocephalia
- Family: †Anteosauridae
- Subfamily: †Syodontinae
- Genus: †Pampaphoneus; Cisneros et al., 2012

Type species
- †Pampaphoneus biccai Cisneros et al., 2012

= Pampaphoneus =

Pampaphoneus Temporal range: Guadalupian (Wordian), 268–265 Ma

Extinct genus of therapsids

Pampaphoneus is an extinct genus of carnivorous dinocephalian therapsid belonging to the family Anteosauridae. It lived 268 to 265 million years ago during the Wordian age of the Guadalupian (= middle Permian) period in what is now Brazil. Pampaphoneus is known by an almost complete skull with the lower jaw still articulated, discovered on the lands of the Boqueirão Farm, near the city of São Gabriel, in the state of Rio Grande do Sul. A second specimen from the same locality was reported in 2019 and 2020 but has not yet been described. It is composed of a skull associated with postcranial remains. It is the first South American species of dinocephalian to have been described. The group was previously known in South America only by a few isolated teeth and a jaw fragment reported in 2000 in the same region of Brazil. Phylogenetic analysis conducted by Cisneros and colleagues reveals that Pampaphoneus is closely related to anteosaurs from European Russia, indicating a closer faunal relationship between South America and Eastern Europe than previously thought, thus promoting a Pangea B continental reconstruction.

== Taxonomy ==
=== Etymology ===
The name of the genus comes from the Pampas, a region of vast plains typical of southern South America, from which the specimen originates, and from the Greek phoneus, meaning "killer", in reference to the predatory habits of the animal. The specific epithet honors José Bicca, the landowner of the farm where the fossil was found.

=== Classification ===
In describing Pampaphoneus, Cisneros et al. presented several cladograms confirming the recognition of the clades Anteosaurinae and Syodontinae erected a year earlier by Christian Kammerer. In all their analyzes, Pampaphoneus is identified as the most basal Syodontinae:

- Therapsida
  - Biarmosuchus tener
  - Dinocephalia
    - - Estemmenosuchus uralensis
      - - Ulemosaurus svijagensis
        - Tapinocaninus pamelae
    - Anteosauridae
      - Archaeosyodon praeventor
      - - Anteosaurinae
          - Sinophoneus yumenensis
          - - Titanophoneus adamanteus
            - - Titanophoneus potens
              - Anteosaurus magnificus
        - Syodontinae
          - Pampaphoneus biccai
          - - Notosyodon gusevi
            - - Syodon biarmicum
              - Australosyodon nyaphuli

== Description ==
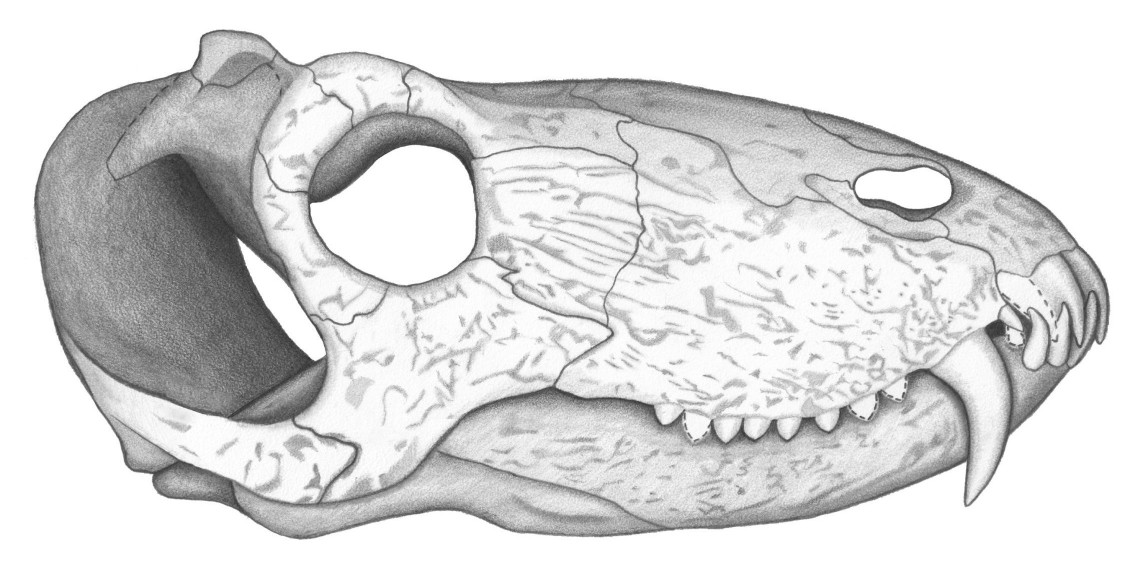
Reconstruction of the skull of Pampaphoneus biccai by Juan Carlos Cisneros.

The holotype (UFRGS PV386P) of Pampaphoneus is a skull measuring approximately 32 cm in length. As with all anteosaurs, the ventral margin of the premaxilla is inclined upwards and the postorbital bar is strongly curved anteroventrally so that the temporal fenestra undercuts orbit. The skull roof is slightly pachyostosed. The temporal fenestrae open widely on the skull roof where the insertion zone of the adductor musculature of the mandible extends to the pineal boss. The frontals contribute to the insertion zone of this musculature and also participate to the anterior edge of the pineal boss. These characteristics indicate that Pampaphoneus belongs to the clade Syodontinae. Within this group it is with the Russian species Syodon biarmicum that Pampaphoneus shares the most similarities. Like the latter, it possesses strongly recurved hook-like canines and very low postcanines with serrassions. The canines of the holotype are 7 cm in length. Pampaphoneus however differs from Syodon by its larger size, more robust snout, thickened postorbital forming a supraorbital boss, and a well-developed ridge extending from the pineal boss to the orbital rim. It also differs from other anteosaurs by its squamosal with a jugal process extending beyond the anterior edge of the temporal fenestra. Also unlike Syodon, Pampaphoneus lacked bifurcating anterior processes in its parietals. Its antorbital depression is also more gradual than in Syodon and excavates the posterior of the maxilla and the postfrontal and not just the lacrimal as it does in Syodon. A peculiarity of the holotype that was thought to be a diagnostic feature is the presence of only four teeth per premaxilla (the fourth incisor, small in size, being however laterally masked by the maxilla) and eight postcanines. However, a second skull (yet undescribed) was reported showing some differences with the holotype such as the presence of five premaxillary teeth and only seven postcanines. Since the other cranial elements are very similar, these differences are interpreted as intraspecific variation. Although being a Syodontinae, Pampaphoneus also shares several characters with the more derived Anteosaurinae. It thus has a well-developed medial crest on the skull roof, while a pronounced thickening of each postorbital forms a supraorbital boss similar to that of a subadult individual of the Russian Titanophoneus potens. In addition, the angular bone of the lower jaw bears a boss as in Anteosaurus and the two species of Titanophoneus. This angular boss is however much less developed in Pampaphoneus.

== Paleoenvironment ==
=== Palaeobiogeography ===
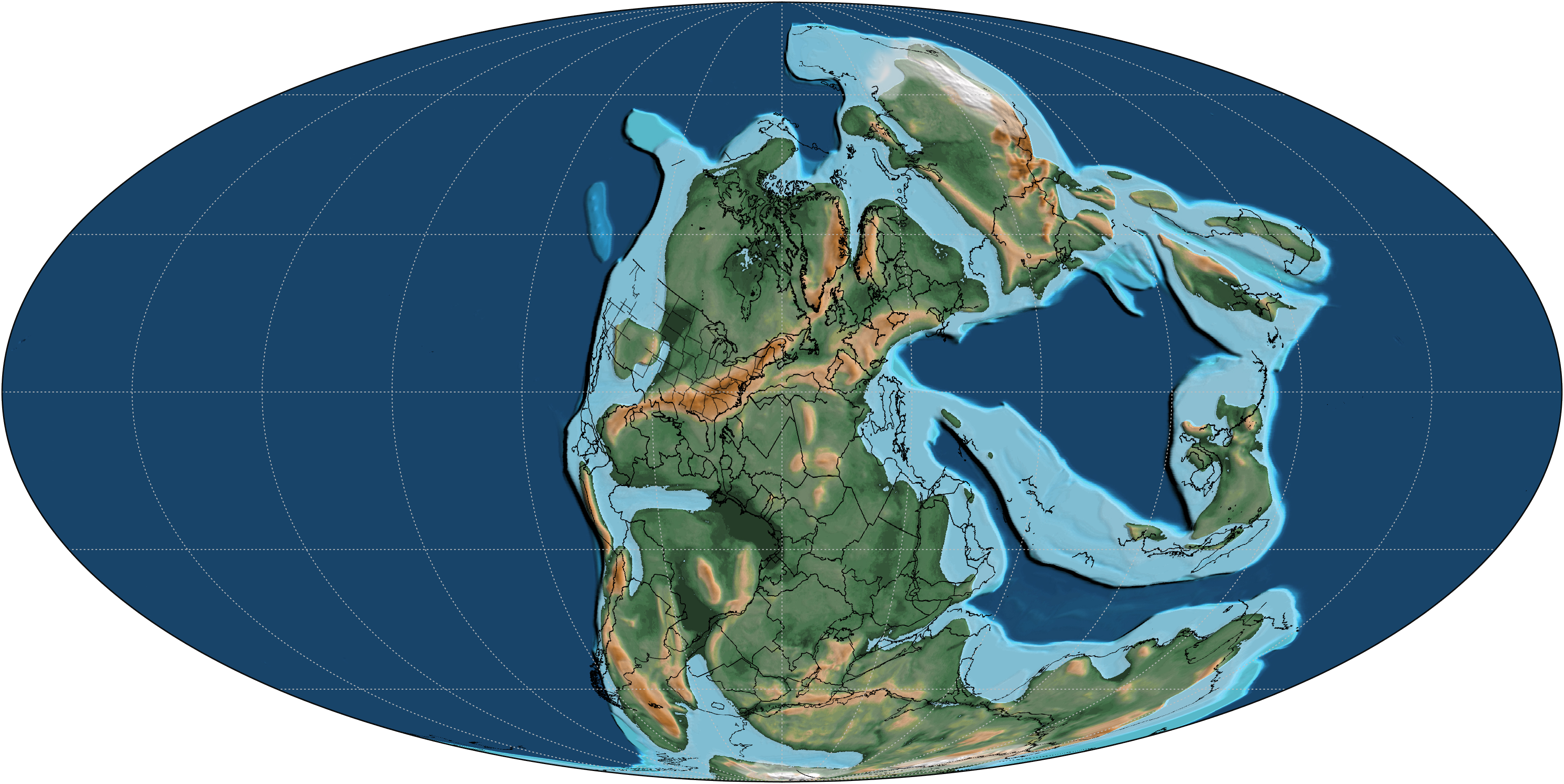
Map of Earth during the Wordian stage of the Guadalupian

During the Permian, most of the landmasses were united into a single supercontinent, Pangea, which was roughly C-shaped. Its northern (Laurasia) and southern (Gondwana) parts were connected to the west but separated to the east by a very large oceanic bay - the Tethys. A long string of microcontinents, grouped under the name of Cimmeria, divided the Tethys in two: the Paleo-Tethys in the north, and the Neo-Tethys in the south. In the northern hemisphere, anteosaurs are known from eastern European Russia, Kazakhstan, and China, territories corresponding to mid-paleolatitudes between the 30th and 40th parallel north. In the southern hemisphere, anteosaur remains are known in South Africa, Zambia and Zimbabwe, territories which were all located at high paleolatitudes located at the level of the 60th parallel south. The Brazilian localities were located a little further north, between the 35th and the 45th parallel south. The close relationship of the Brazilian Pampaphoneus with some South African and Russian anteosaurs suggests dispersal through western Pangea rather than eastern Pangea via the Cathaysian Bridge. The latter included parts of northern and southern China, Korea, and Indochina and played an important role in the dispersal of therapsids in the late Permian and Triassic. However, this bridge was probably not yet formed in the Middle Permian and marine barriers broke up the different Cathaysian blocks, making it difficult for animals to disperse from Cathaysia to Southern Africa via Eastern Europe. Cisneros and colleagues suggest a seemingly easier migration route via western Pangea by favoring a Pangea B-type continental reconstruction where South America was juxtaposed with the Appalachia and was thus closer to Russia than in the Pangea A reconstruction. In the latter, the Appalachian and Mauritanides mountains would have been difficult natural barriers to cross. In contrast, in a Pangea B configuration, Brazil was not only closer to Eastern Europe, but the only mountain barrier along the way was the moderately high European Hercynides. Anteosaurs would have migrated from Russia (where the oldest specimens come from) to southern Africa, passing through eastern Europe and western Africa (bypassing the Mauritanides chain) and then through Brazil. The discovery of probable anteosaur footprints in southern France, which was then located at low paleolatitude, at the level of the 10th parallel north, also supports this hypothesis, the south-western Europe being in this migration corridor.

=== Paleoecology ===
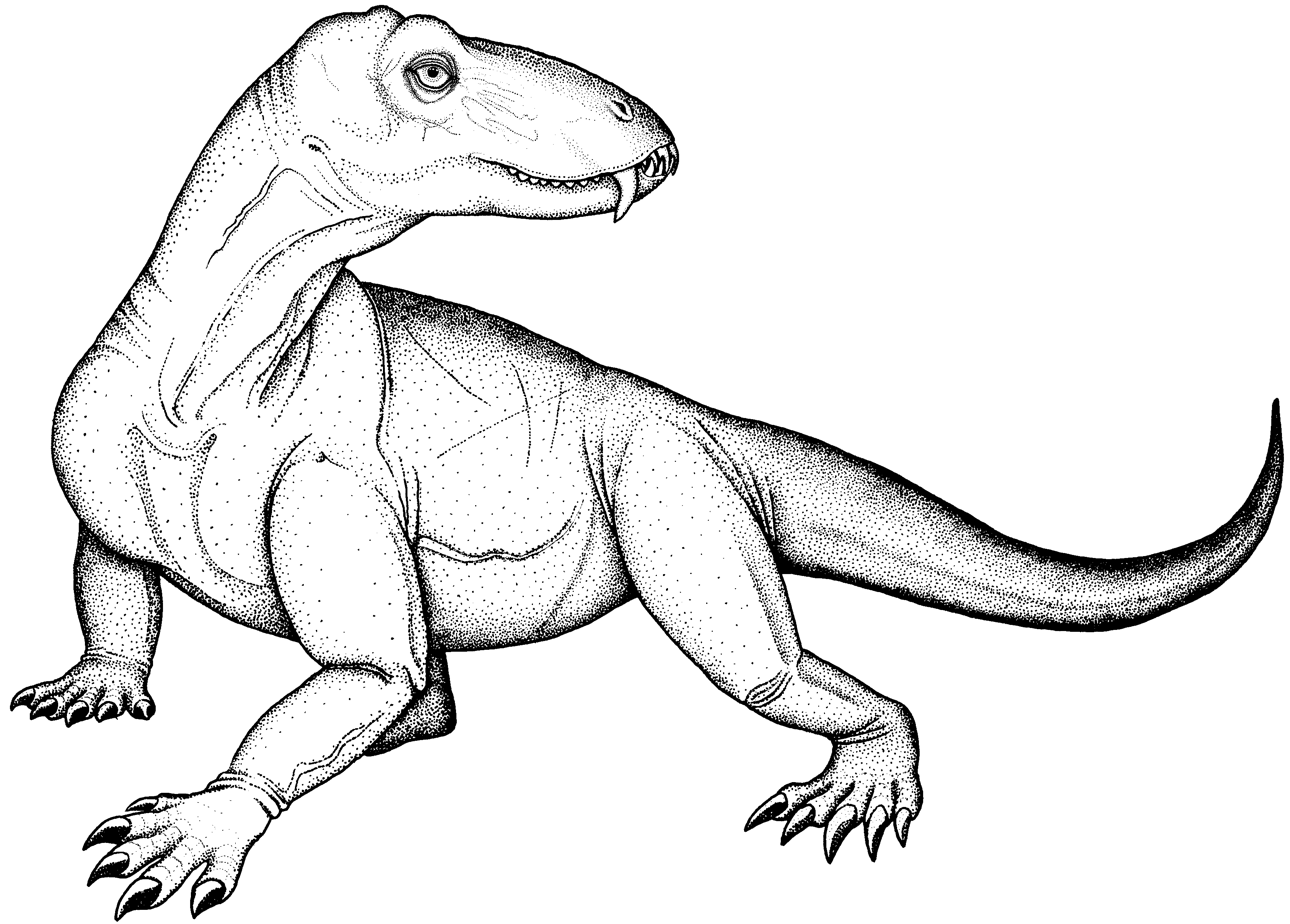
Life restoration of Pampaphoneus biccai by Juan Carlos Cisneros.

Remains of Pampaphoneus comes from the Morro Pelado Member of the Rio do Rasto Formation, outcropping on the lands of the Boqueirão farm in the municipality of São Gabriel (district of Catuçaba, State of Rio Grande do Sul). The fossils are preserved there in a fine pinkish sandstone and are covered with a dark crust of iron oxide. Sediments of the Morro Pelado Member were deposited in fluvio-lacustrine and deltaic settings suggesting alluvial conditions with coalescing floodplains. Aeolian facies (fossil dunes) present in the upper part of the Morro Pelado Member attest to a progressive aridification of the environment. Palaeogeographically, southeastern Brazil was located at mid-latitudes between the 35th and 45th parallel south, where a warm temperate climate probably prevailed with a prolonged dry season. The flora included forests of Glossopteris communis which occupied the floodplains and the overbank channels while the more humid biotopes were covered with dense mats of equisetids including equisetales (Schizoneura and Phyllotheca ) and sphenophyllales (Sphenophyllum paranaense). Besides Pampaphoneus, the Boqueirão farm site also contains the temnospondyl Konzhukovia sangabrielensis and the small dicynodont Rastodon. Other localities in the Morro Pelado Member have also yielded tetrapod remains. In Rio Grande do Sul, several sites around Aceguá in the district of Minuano have yielded the most complete fossils of the pareiasaur Provelosaurus. The Fagundes farm locality (São Gabriel, Catuçaba district) yielded a fragmentary skull of Provelosaurus, teeth of undetermined Anteosaurid, Titanosuchid and Tapinocephalid dinocephalians, and an undetermined amphibian. In the district of Tiarajú (also near São Gabriel) was found the basal anomodont Tiarajudens From the Serra do Cadeado area (near Ortigueira, State of Paraná), come the amphibian Australerpeton, an undetermined species of the dicynodont Endothiodon, (possibly E. bathystoma) as well as an indeterminate tapinocephalid dinocephalian showing similarities with the genera Moschops and Moschognathus. However, there are uncertainties about the contemporaneity of all these sites. Vertebrate fossils from the Rio do Rasto Formation occur in scattered, isolated, and discontinuous outcrops due to dense vegetation cover, making it difficult to establish local correlations. The precise location of several ancient discoveries is uncertain and several taxa could come from different stratigraphic levels within the Rio do Rasto Formation. This is the case of the fossils of Paraná, where tapinocephalid and Endothiodon remains could come from two distinct levels.
