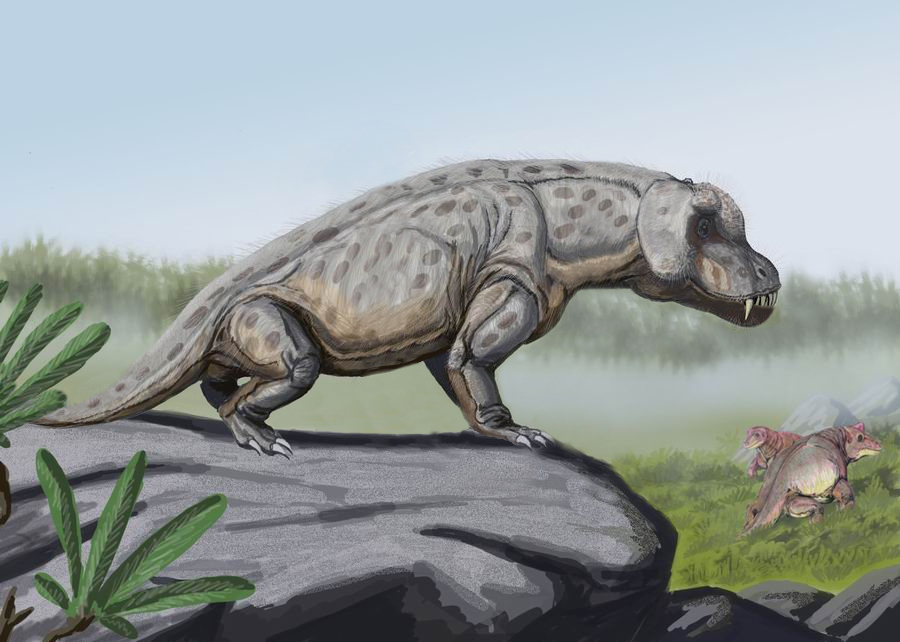
- Life restoration of Anteosaurus
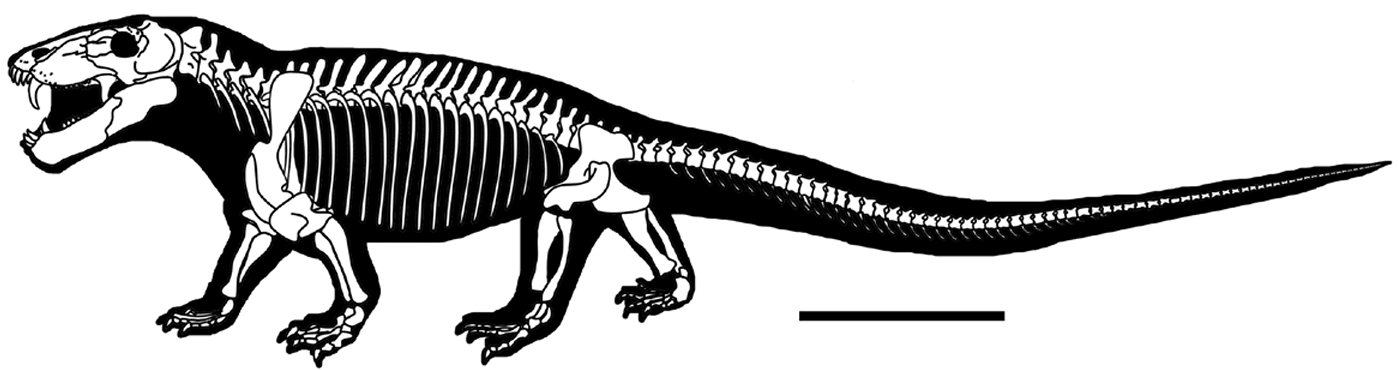
- Skeleton of Titanophoneus

Scientific classification
- Kingdom: Animalia
- Phylum: Chordata
- Clade: Synapsida
- Clade: Therapsida
- Suborder: †Dinocephalia
- Infraorder: †Anteosauria; Boonstra, 1962
- Family: †Anteosauridae; Boonstra, 1954

Subgroups
- †Archaeosyodon; †Sinophoneus; †Anteosaurinae; †Syodontinae

Synonyms
- Anteosauroidea King, 1988

= Anteosauria =

Anteosaurs Temporal range: Middle Permian, 272–260 Ma

Extinct clade of therapsids

Anteosauria is a clade of large, basal carnivorous dinocephalian therapsids characterized by large canines and incisors, as well as short limbs. Anteosaurs are known from the Middle Permian formations of South Africa, Russia, China, and Brazil. Some grew very large, with skulls 50–80 centimetres (20–31 in) long, and were the largest predators of their time. Anteosaurs, as well as the rest of the dinocephalians, went extinct during the Capitanian mass extinction, which marked the end of the Middle Permian. Recent studies have considered Anteosauria to have the same scope as Anteosauridae.

== Description ==
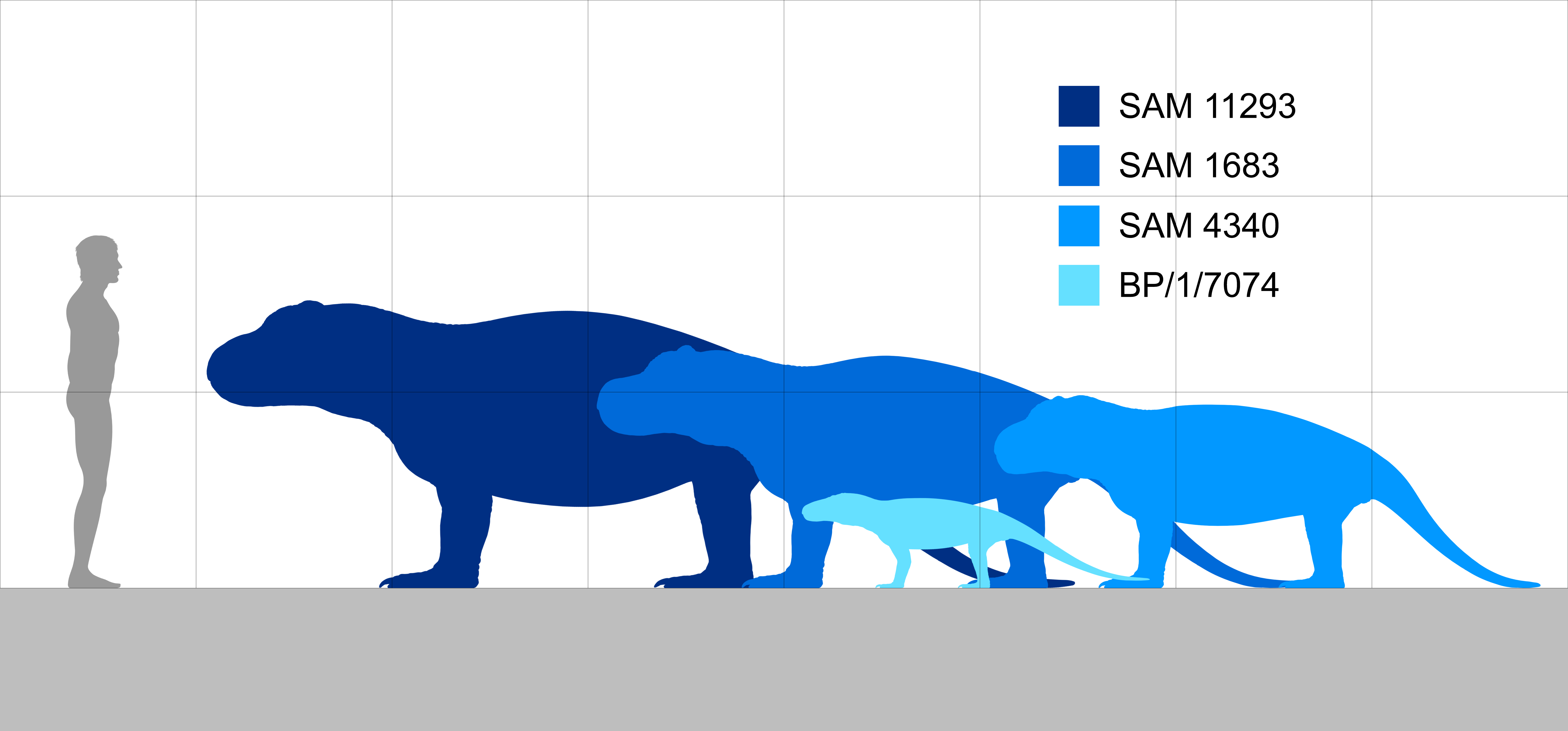
Size of Anteosaurus compared to a human

Size of Titanophoneus compared to a human

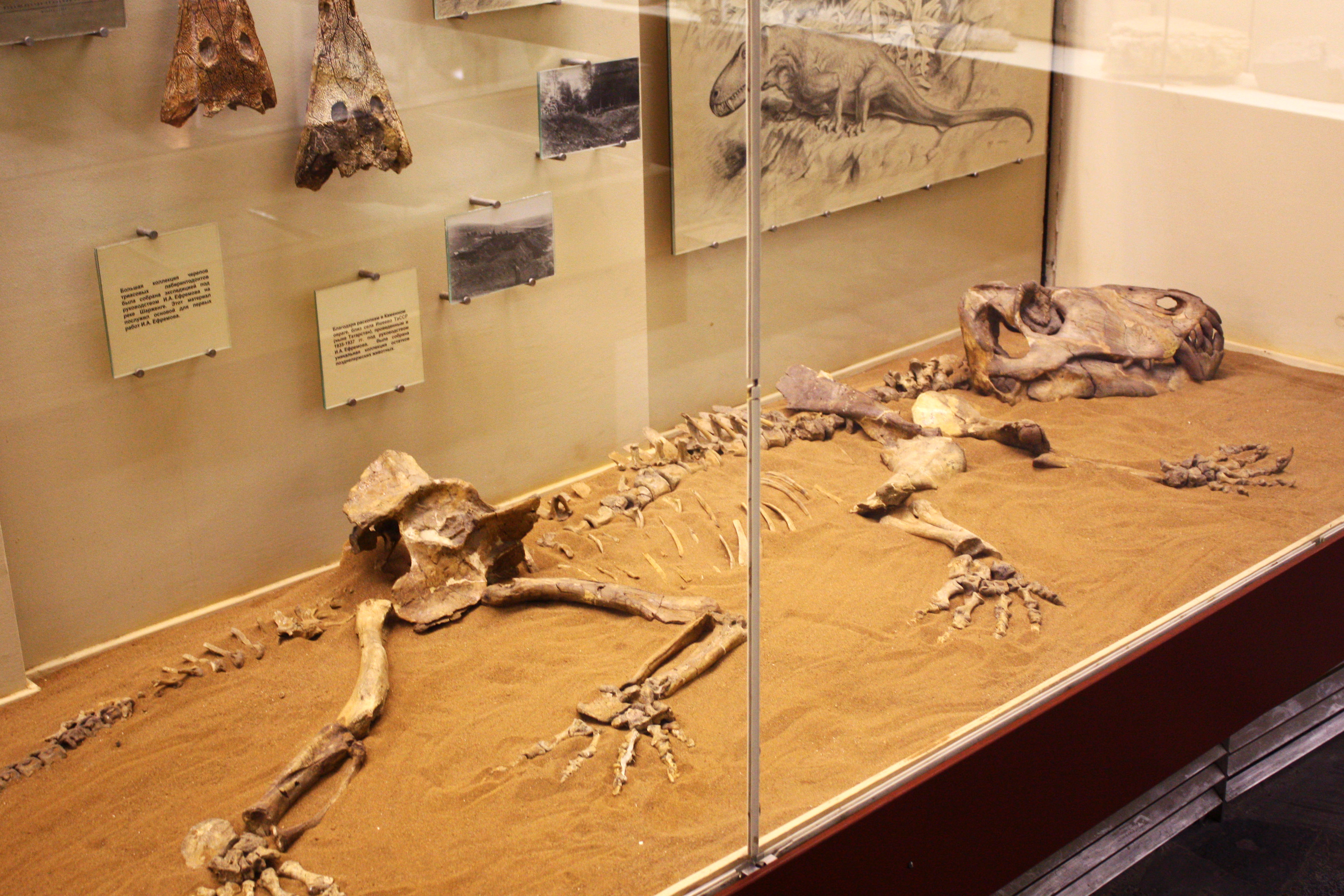
Skeleton of Titanophoneus

Skull diagram of Syodon

Anteosaurs are unified by several characters, including having upturned premaxillas (the tooth bearing bone at the front of the snout), the vomer bones on the palate having raised, elongate edges, a "jugal-lacrimal ridge", the quadrate rami of the pterygoid bones are "tightly adpressed", the ventral (lower) border of the maxilla (the main tooth bearing upper jaw bone) is convex, and having a postorbital bar that is strongly anteroventrally (towards both the front and bottom of the skull) curved. There are generally 4-5 pairs of incisors and pair of canines in the upper and lower jaws, with the incisor teeth like those of other dinocephalians being interlocking. The canine teeth in the upper jaw are particularly enlarged. The number of postcanine teeth varies from 8-11 in both jaws. The post-canine teeth are generally blunt/bulbous.^{41-45, 57} The tails of anteosaurs are relatively long, with some having over 60 caudal vetebrae.^{46} Anteosaurs vary considerably in size, with adult skulls varying in length from 21.8 centimetres (8.6 in) in Syodon to over 80 centimetres (31 in) in Anteosaurus, with Anteosaurus estimated to exceed 400 kilograms (880 lb) in body mass. Adults of large anteosaur species can exhibit considerable thickening (pachyostosis) of the bones of the skull roof, though this is relatively incipient in some anteosaurs.

== Classification ==
=== Evolutionary relationships ===
Initially, it has been suggested that the estemmenosuchids are the most basal of the dinocephalians. However, most experts now recover anteosaurs as the most basal of the dinocephalians. It has been hypothesized that the Russian anteosaurs Archaeosyodon and Microsyodon generally considered the most basal members of the clade, although several recent studies have now recovered Sinophoneus as the most basal anteosaur. They have featured in common with pelycosaurs (Carroll 1988) and biarmosuchians (Chudinov 1965), and, with the tapinocephalians, are part of the first major evolutionary radiation of the therapsids.

=== Phylogeny ===
James Hopson and Herbert Barghusen in 1986 provided the first cladistic study of the Therapsida. They used the term "Anteosauria" and synonymised the families Brithopodidae and Anteosauridae. In 2010, Christian Kammerer published a re-evaluation of anteosaurian relationships.

The cladogram below follows an updated (2012) version of Kammerer's analysis by Juan Carolos Cisneros and colleagues.

- - Biarmosuchus
  - - Tapinocephalia
      - Estemmenosuchus
      - - Ulemosaurus
        - Tapinocaninus
    - Anteosauridae
      - Archaeosyodon
      - - Anteosaurinae
          - Sinophoneus
          - - Titanophoneus adamanteus
            - - Titanophoneus potens
              - Anteosaurus
        - Syodontinae
          - Pampaphoneus
          - - Notosyodon
            - - Syodon
              - Australosyodon

Cladogram following Liu (2013).

- Therapsida
  - Biarmosuchus tener
  - Dinocephalia
    - - Estemmenosuchus uralensis
      - - Ulemosaurus svijagensis
        - Tapinocaninus pamelae
    - Anteosauridae
      - Sinophoneus yumenensis
      - - Archaeosyodon praeventor
        - - Anteosaurinae
            - Anteosaurus magnificus
            - - Titanophoneus adamanteus
              - Titanophoneus potens
          - Syodontinae
            - Pampaphoneus biccai
            - - Notosyodon gusevi
              - - Syodon biarmicum
                - - Australosyodon nyaphuli
                  - Microsyodon orlovi

=== Taxonomy ===
The group name Anteosauria was first used by L. D. Boonstra in 1955 to include the families Brithopodidae and Anteosauridae. In his 1988 review, Gillian King named the superfamily Anteosauroidea to include the following families, in which the "Titanosuchidae" is equivalent to the "Tapinocephalia".

- Superfamily Anteosauroidea Boonstra, 1962
  - Family Brithopidae Boonstra, 1972
    - Subfamily Brithopodinae Efremov, 1954
    - Subfamily Anteosaurinae Boonstra, 1954
  - Family Titanosuchidae Boonstra, 1972
    - Subfamily Titanosuchinae Broom, 1903
    - Subfamily Tapinocephalinae Lydekker, 1890

However, Kammerer (2011) found the postcranial of Brithopus to be different from anteosaurs, as the distal humeral had an relatively large entepicondylar foramen and well-developed supinator process, in comparison anteosaurs had a relatively small entepicondylar foramen supinator process. This suggests Brithopus was an tapinocephalian instead of an anteosaur. Within the same paper, he also recovers Deuterosaurus as an tapinocephalian. His analysis recovers anteosaurs as a monophyletic clade of dinocephalians and was equivalent to Anteosauridae. Following Kammerer (2011), other experts have recovered anteosaurids as equivalent to Anteosauria.

However, Duhamel et al. (2026) found little evidence of recovering anteosaurs as a monophyletic group and recovered Sinophoneus outside of the clade as the vomers of Sinophoneus lacked elongated edges, as well as the absence of a ridge between the jugal and lacrimal.

== Palaeobiology ==
=== Ecology ===
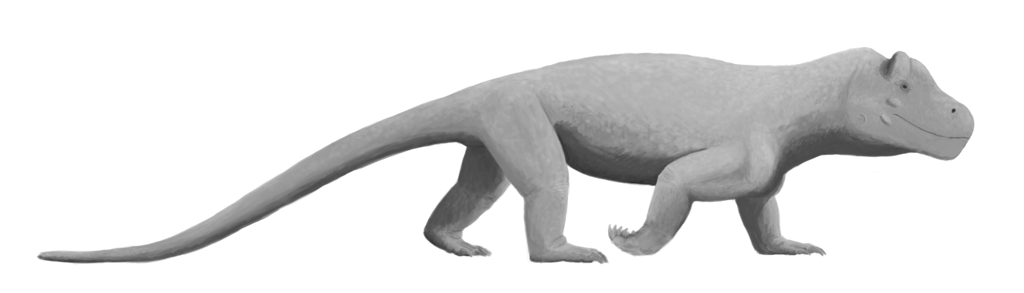
Life restoration of Anteosaurus

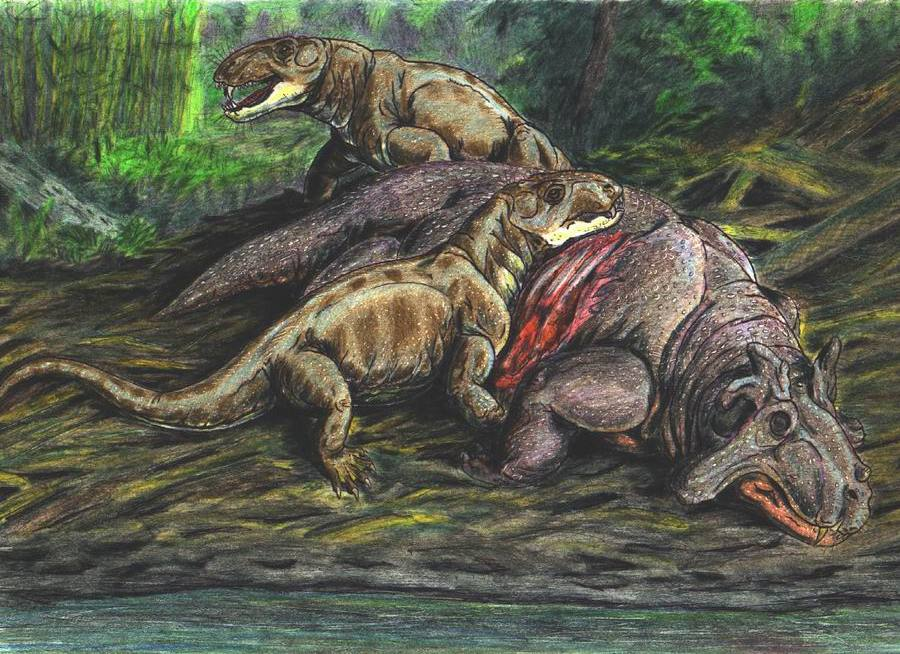
Two Archaeosyodon feeding on an Estemmenosuchus

The stance of a typical anteosaur, such as Titanophoneus, was primitive. Rather than the limbs being drawn in under the body, the stance was more sprawling. Olson (1962) notes that the Russian dinocephalian assemblages indicate environments tied to water, and Boonstra considered that the roughly contemporary Anteosaurus was a slinking crocodile-like semi-aquatic form. The long tail, weak limbs, and sprawling posture do indeed suggest some sort of crocodile-like existence. However, the thickened skull-roof indicates that these animals were quite able to get about on land, if they were to practice the typically dinocephalian head-butting behavior. All other head-butters, pachycephalosaurian dinosaurs, titanothere ungulates, and goats were or are completely terrestrial. Bhat et al. (2021) suggested that Anteosaurus may have occasionally inhabited shallow and short-lived pools, similar to modern day hippopotamus, based on its bone histology.

On the other hand, analysis on the brain of a juvenile specimen suggested Anteosaurus were not sluggish predators. X-ray imaging and 3-D reconstructions showcase that Anteosaurus were fast, agile animals in spite of their great size: the inner ears were larger than those of its closest relatives and competitors, suggesting that Anteosaurus was well-suited to the role of an apex predator that could outrun both its rivals and prey alike. The area of its brain responsible for coordinating the movements of the eyes with the head was also determined to have been exceptionally large, an important feature to ensure that they could track their prey accurately. As a result, Anteosaurus is thought to be well-adapted to pursuing land-based prey.

=== Feeding ===
Anteosaurs were evolved to prey on particularly large animals and were among the most highly predaceous of all synapsids (Sennikov, 1996), potential prey included the bull-sized armored pareiasaurs (Lee, 1997) and enormous tapinocephalid dinocephalians (Rubidge, 1995).

The large anteosaurs were efficient predators, more specialized than earlier and more primitive biarmosuchid and eotitanosuchid carnivorous therapsids, as the temporal opening behind the eye socket was larger, indicating a greater muscle mass available for closing the lower jaw. Large pterygoid flanges indicate a well-developed Kinetic-Inertial system in anteosaurs, and increased vertical alignment of the temporalis muscles suggests an expanded Static-Pressure component of the bite cycle.

=== Social behaviour ===
Anteosaurs likely used their large canines, in addition to their primary predatory function, as social display items, and likely engaged in face biting combat against rival individuals of the same species.
