= Isheyevo =

Isheyevo Ишеево
- Selo
- Location within Bashkortostan Location within Russia
- Coordinates: 53°37′N 56°08′E
- Country: Russia
- Region: Bashkortostan
- District: Ishimbaysky District
- Time zone: UTC+5:00

Isheyevo (Russian: Ишеево; Bashkir: Ишәй, İşäy) is a rural locality (a selo) and the administrative centre of Isheyevsky Selsoviet, Ishimbaysky District, Bashkortostan, Russia. The population was 1,000 as of 2010. There are 14 streets.

== Geography ==
Isheyevo is located 28 km north of Ishimbay (the district's administrative centre) by road. Vostok is the nearest rural locality.
