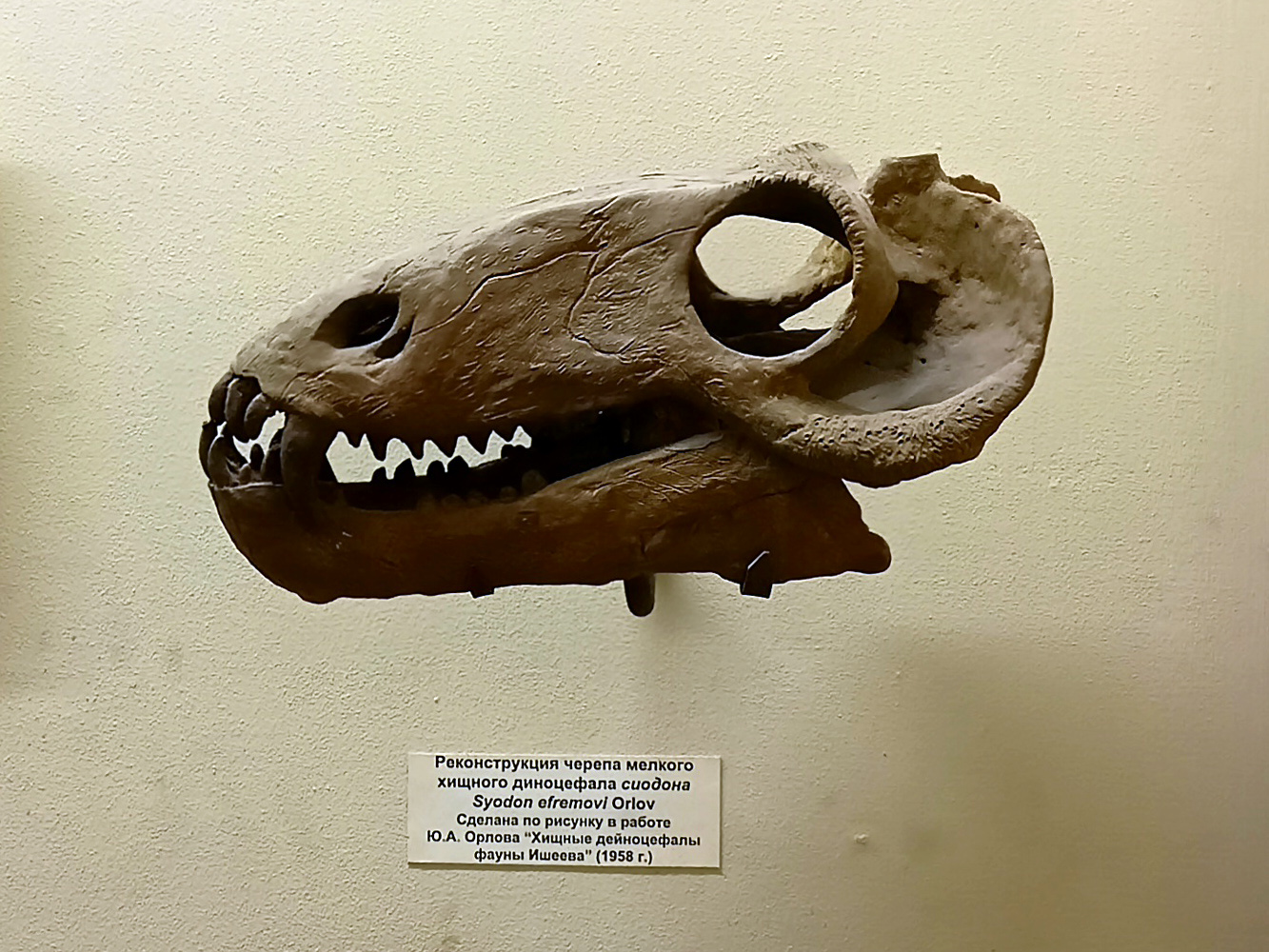
- Skull in Moscow Paleontological Museum

Scientific classification
- Kingdom: Animalia
- Phylum: Chordata
- Clade: Synapsida
- Clade: Therapsida
- Suborder: †Dinocephalia
- Family: †Anteosauridae
- Subfamily: †Syodontinae
- Genus: †Syodon; Kutorga, 1838
- Species: †S. biarmicum

Binomial name
- †Syodon biarmicum Kutorga, 1838

= Syodon =

Syodon Temporal range: Middle Permian (Wordian to Capitanian) ~266–262 Ma

Extinct genus of therapsids

Syodon (from Greek: kleio, "close, shut" and Greek: odon, "tooth", "closed-root tooth") is an extinct genus of dinocephalian therapsids that lived approximately 266-262 million years ago during the middle Permian period of the Paleozoic era. These therapsids, discovered in Russia were initially believed to be true mammals. Syodon was first named by Stephan Kutorga in 1838.

== Discovery ==
Syodon was one of the first non-mammalian synapsids to be described, named by Stepan Kutorga in 1838 from an isolated canine found in the Russian Urals. Originally the tooth was interpreted as that of a "pachyderm" mammal, but was recognised as belonging to a non-mammalian synapsid in the 1870s. Cliorhizodon orenburgensis known from a partial maxilla, as well as Syodon efremovi (originally Cliorhizodon efremovi), known from a complete skull and lower jaws (PIN 157/2) are now recognised as synonyms of S. biarmicum.

== Description ==
Skull diagram

The skull of the adult PIN 157/2 individual is around 21.8 centimetres (8.6 in) long. The strongly curved ‘hook-like' canine of Syodon is highly distinctive and allows it to be distinguished easily from most other anteosaurs. It is distinguished from Notosyodon by having a thinner zygomatic region. Syodon is characterized by possessing "bulbous" post-canines featuring significant wear facets in adults, whereas juveniles tend to have ‘bladelike’ post canines. Syodon also features set of smaller, replacement teeth out-of-place from the main palatine tooth row. The snout of Syodon is relatively long and narrow.

== Ecology ==
Syodon was a relatively small predatory anteosaur. It lived alongside other animals in the Isheevo faunal assemblage, such as the larger predatory anteosaur Titanophoneus, the predatory therocephalian Porosteognathus, the herbivorous large tapinocephalian Ulemosaurus, small herbivorous bolosaurid reptiles, the reptiliomorphs Enosuchus and Lanthanosuchus, as well as the temnospondyls Tryphosuchus, Konzhukovia, and Uralosuchus.

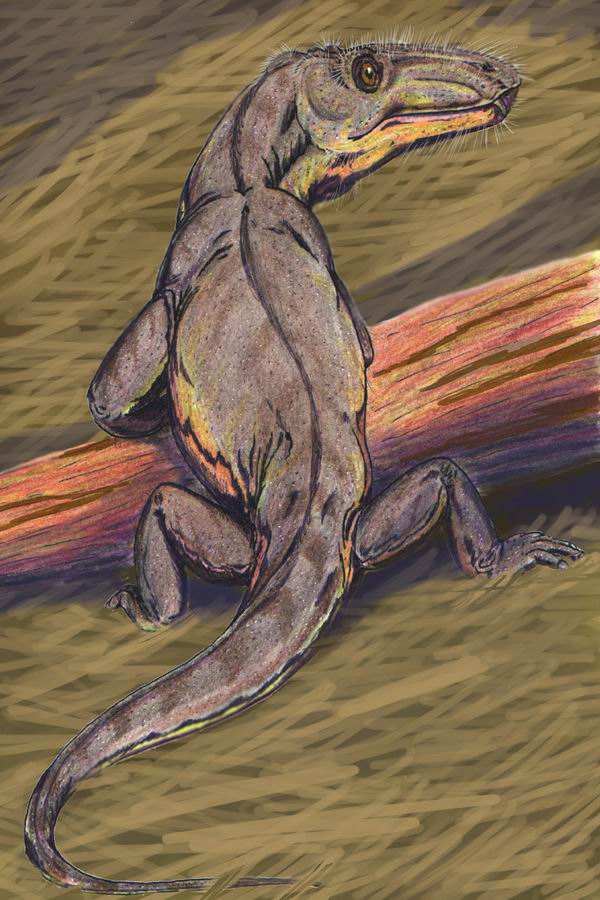
Life restoration

== See also ==
- List of therapsids
- Archaeosyodon
- Microsyodon
