= Microsyodon =

Microsyodon Temporal range: middle Permian

Scientific classification
- Kingdom: Animalia
- Phylum: Chordata
- Clade: Synapsida
- Clade: Therapsida
- Suborder: †Dinocephalia
- Family: †Anteosauridae
- Genus: †Microsyodon; Ivakhnenko, 1995
- Species: †M. orlovi

Binomial name
- †Microsyodon orlovi Ivakhnenko, 1995

Extinct genus of therapsids

Microsyodon is an extinct genus of non-mammalian therapsids.

== See also ==
- List of therapsids
