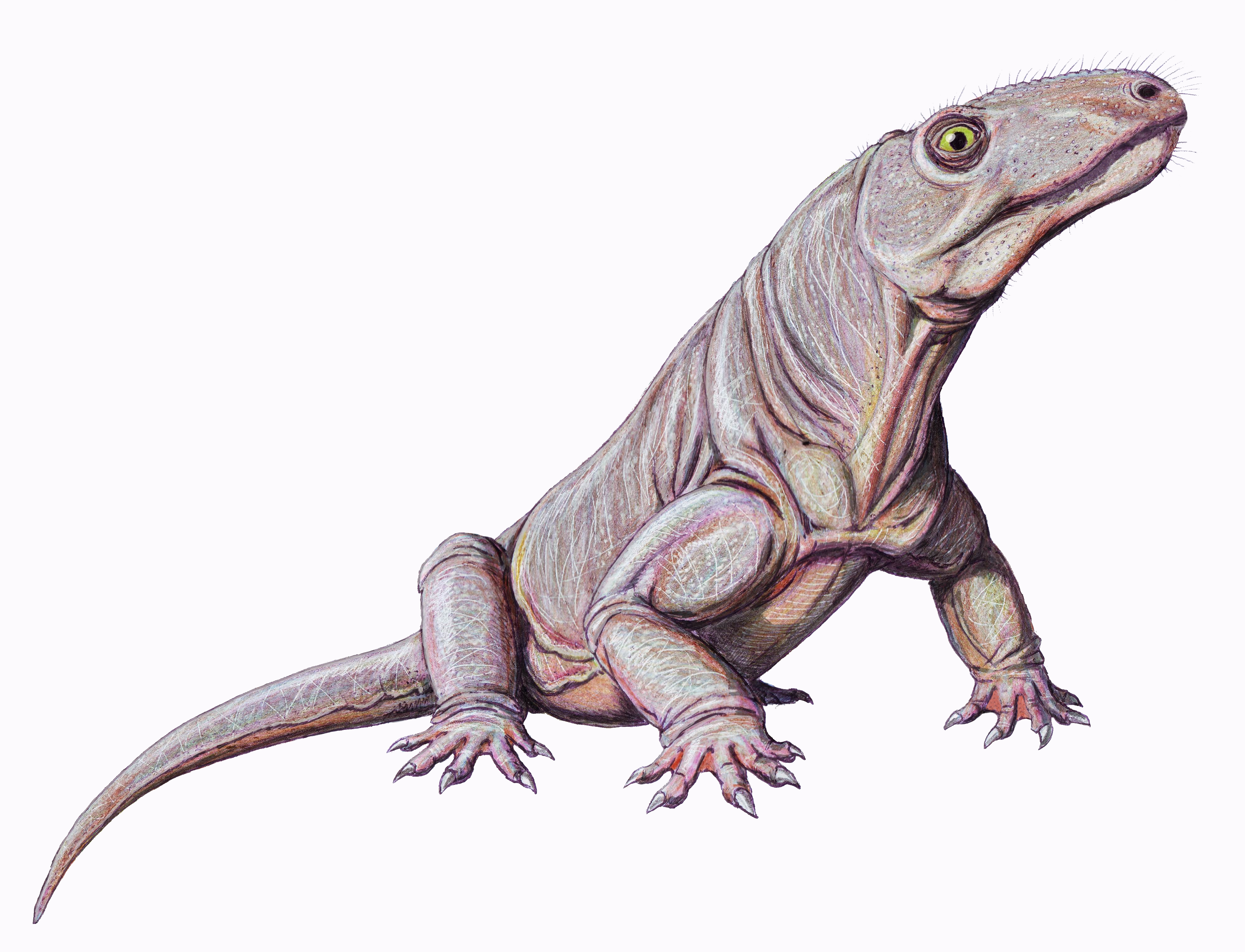
- Restoration of Archaeosyodon praeventor

Scientific classification
- Kingdom: Animalia
- Phylum: Chordata
- Clade: Synapsida
- Clade: Therapsida
- Suborder: †Dinocephalia
- Family: †Anteosauridae
- Genus: †Archaeosyodon; Tchudinov, 1960
- Species: †A. praeventor

Binomial name
- †Archaeosyodon praeventor Tchudinov, 1960

= Archaeosyodon =

Archaeosyodon Temporal range: Middle Permian

Extinct genus of therapsids

Archaeosyodon is an extinct genus of dinocephalian therapsids. It was medium-sized, reaching about 1.5–2 m (4–5 ft) in length.

== See also ==
- List of therapsids
