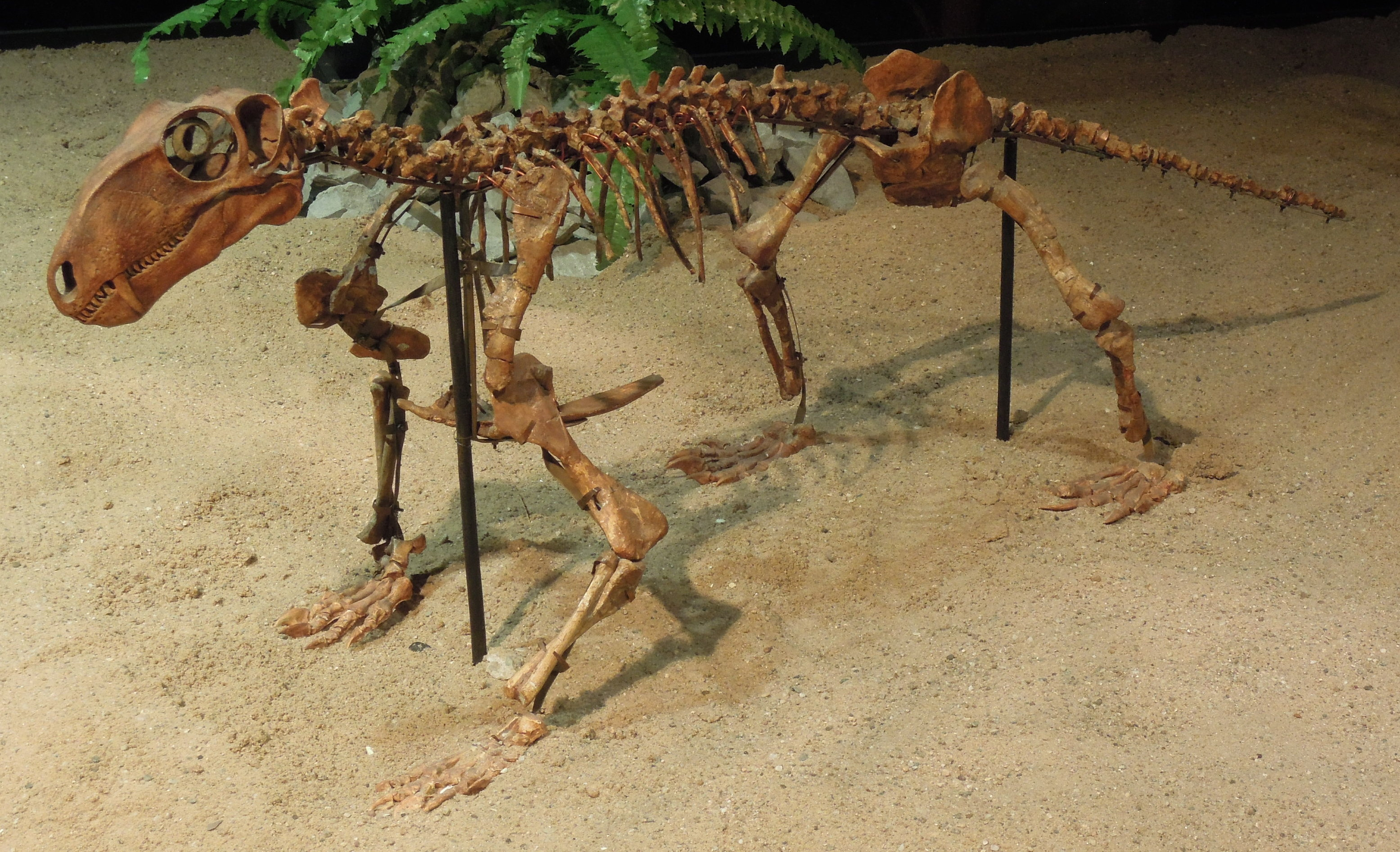
- Mounted skeleton of B. tener (above) and restoration (below)
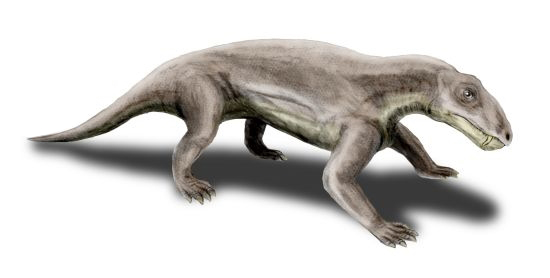

Scientific classification
- Kingdom: Animalia
- Phylum: Chordata
- Clade: Synapsida
- Clade: Therapsida
- Suborder: †Biarmosuchia
- Family: †Biarmosuchidae
- Genus: †Biarmosuchus; Tchudinov, 1960

Type species
- †Biarmosuchus tener Tchudinov, 1960

Other species
- †B. tchudinovi Ivakhnenko, 1999

Synonyms
- ?Eotitanosuchus Tchudinov, 1960; ?Ivantosaurus Tchudinov, 1983

= Biarmosuchus =

Biarmosuchus Temporal range: Wordian, 267 Ma

Extinct genus of therapsids

Biarmosuchus is an extinct genus of biarmosuchian therapsids that lived around 267 mya during the Middle Permian period. Biarmosuchus was discovered in the Perm region of Russia. The first specimen was found in channel sandstone that was deposited by flood waters originating from the young Ural Mountains.

== Description ==
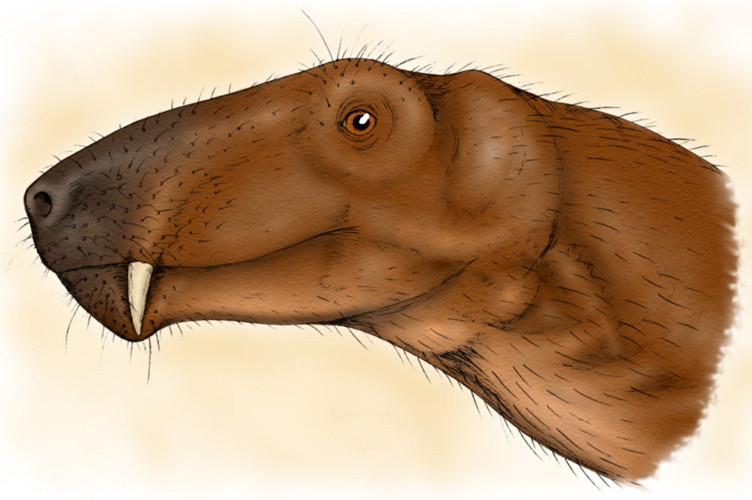
The head of Biarmosuchus tener

Biarmosuchus was a medium-sized predator, similar in size to a large dog, grew up to 1.5 m (4 ft 11 in) to 2 m (6 ft 7 in) in length with a skull length 15 cm (5.9 in) (immature) to 21 cm (8.3 in). It was a lightly built, probably agile animal that would have fed on smaller tetrapods. Their legs are quite long, and the animals were probably quite agile in spite of their size. A large opening for the eye and a small temple opening common in primitive stem-mammals, this lends to a weak bite but how it ate is pure speculation. The teeth contained eight small incisors on the palate, followed by a canine tooth and a further five canine teeth. So together the species contained fourteen upper teeth and twelve lower teeth of small size.

== Discovery and species ==
Biarmosuchus tener was described by Chudinov in 1960 from the Ezhovo locality, Udmurtia, Russia. It was named for Bjarmaland, the name for the White Sea region in Old Norse literature. Biarmosuchus tener, known from two assorted skulls and post-cranial remains, including several complete skeletons. In 1999, Biarmosuchus tchudinovi, a new species, was described by Ivakhnenko from the Sokol locality, Udmurtia, Russia.

== Classification ==
Biarmosuchus would seem to represent one of the most primitive of the Biarmosuchia, and could be taken as a good generalized model for the other, mostly later, forms. This genus is abundantly represented, but most of the specimens remain inadequately prepared and have not been used for an anatomical and functional analysis. Such details as the configuration of the palatines are unknown, as well as numerous characteristics of the postcranial skeleton. It may be that several taxa are represented, but in the present state of our knowledge, it is not possible to define them. Biarmosaurus antecessor is based on a larger (206 mm as opposed to 153 mm) skull than the holotype, representing a mature individual. This animal is similar in size to Phthinosuchus, but opinions differ as to how distinct the two forms are. The large size of the orbit (eye socket) constitutes the most notable difference. Three monospecific genera, Biarmosuchus, Eotitanosuchus, and Ivantosaurus, are known from the Ocher locality, differing dramatically in size. Ivakhnenko (1999) argues that these represent different growth stages of the same animal but it is now believed the three forms appear to be quite distinct.

== See also ==
- List of therapsids
