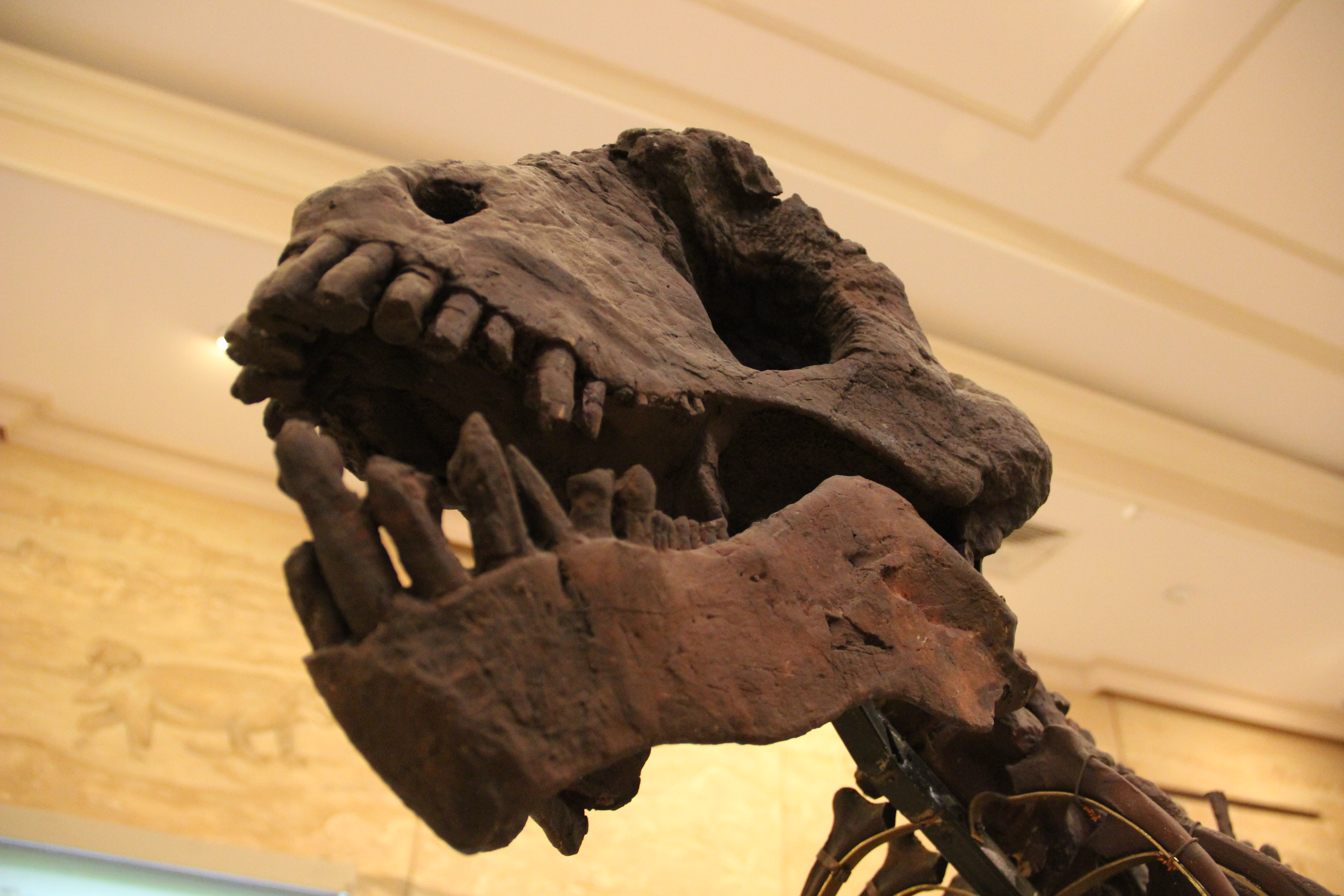
- Skull of Ulemosaurus svijagensis

Scientific classification
- Kingdom: Animalia
- Phylum: Chordata
- Clade: Synapsida
- Clade: Therapsida
- Suborder: †Dinocephalia
- Family: †Tapinocephalidae
- Tribe: †Tapinocephalini
- Subtribe: †Moschopina
- Genus: †Ulemosaurus; Rjabinin, 1938

Type species
- Ulemosaurus svijagensis Riabinin, 1938

Species
- †U. svijagensis Riabinin, 1938; †U. gigas (Efremov 1954)

= Ulemosaurus =

Ulemosaurus Temporal range: Capitanian, 265–260 Ma

Extinct genus of therapsids

Ulemosaurus is an extinct genus of dinocephalian therapsids that lived 265 to 260 million years ago, at Isheevo in Russian Tatarstan. It was a tapinocephalid, a group of bulky herbivores which flourished in the Middle Permian. Ulemosaurus and other tapinocephalians disappeared at the end of the Middle Permian.

== Description ==
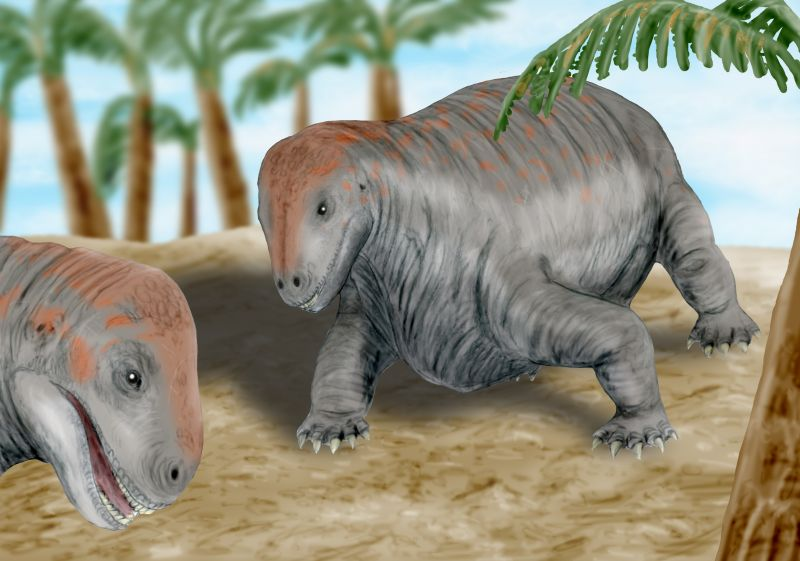
Digital painting of Ulemosaurus svijagensis by Nobu Tamura.

Only several partial skeletons and skulls have been found. Ulemosaurus grew to 4–5 metres (13–16 ft) in length and weighed up to 1 tonne (2,200 lb). The skull bones are extremely dense: about 10 centimetres (3.9 in) at its thickest. This thickening is possibly related to head-butting behavior, as some researchers suggest. The species is considered a herbivore, but because the mandible is heavily constructed some palaeontologists consider it a carnivore, with the species being able to use muscle power to cut prey up with its incisors.

== Classification ==
Ulemosaurus is a large Moschops-like form from Russia. Despite its advanced characteristics, it lived slightly before the Karoo forms, showing that the Moschopines, and indeed the Tapinocephalidae in general, had already attained their acme by early Capitanian time.

== See also ==
- List of therapsids
