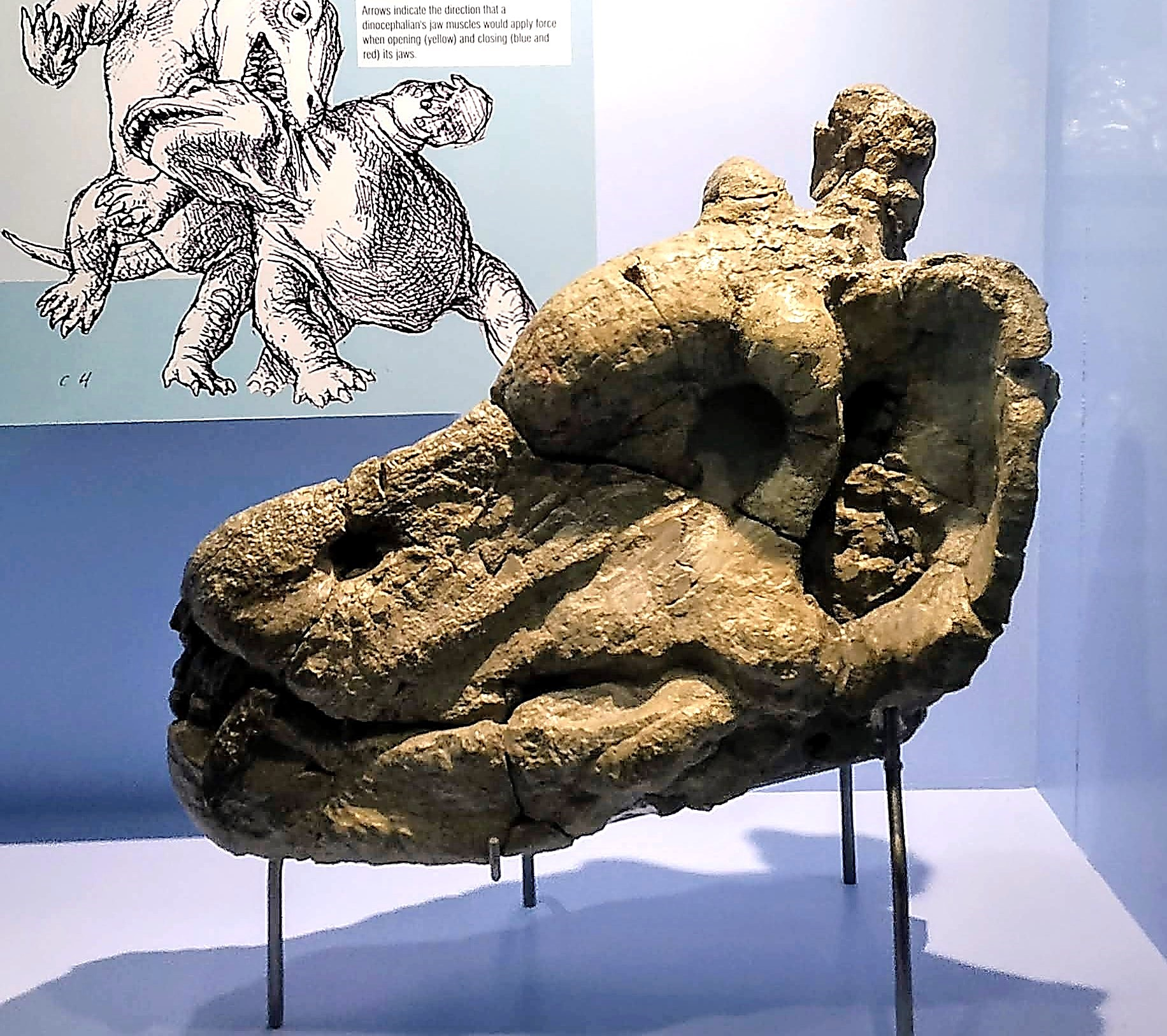
- A. magnificus skull (SAM-PK-11296) on display at the Iziko Museum in Cape Town, South Africa

Scientific classification
- Kingdom: Animalia
- Phylum: Chordata
- Clade: Synapsida
- Clade: Therapsida
- Suborder: †Dinocephalia
- Family: †Anteosauridae
- Subfamily: †Anteosaurinae
- Clade: †Anteosaurini
- Genus: †Anteosaurus; Watson, 1921
- Species: †A. magnificus

Binomial name
- †Anteosaurus magnificus Watson, 1921

Synonyms
- Genus synonymy: Eccasaurus (?) Broom, 1909; Titanognathus Broili & Schröder, 1935; Dinosuchus Broom, 1936; Broomosuchus Camp, 1942; Micranteosaurus Boonstra, 1954; Paranteosaurus Boonstra, 1954; Pseudanteosaurus Boonstra, 1954; Species synonymy: Eccasaurus priscus (?) Broom, 1909; Anteosaurus minor Broom, 1929; Titanognathus lotzi Broili & Schröder, 1935; Dinosuchus vorsteri Broom, 1936; Broomosuchus vorsteri Camp, 1942; Anteosaurus abeli Boonstra, 1952; Anteosaurus vorsteri Boonstra, 1953; Titanosuchus lotzi Boonstra, 1953; Anteosuchus acutirostris Boonstra, 1954; Anteosaurus crassifrons Boonstra, 1954; Anteosaurus cruentus Boonstra, 1954; Anteosaurus laticeps Boonstra, 1954; Anteosaurus levops Boonstra, 1954; Anteosaurus lotzi Boonstra, 1954; Anteosaurus major Boonstra, 1954; Anteosaurus minusculus Boonstra, 1954; Paranteosaurus primus Boonstra, 1954; Pseudanteosaurus minor Boonstra, 1954; Micranteosaurus parvus Boonstra, 1954

= Anteosaurus =

Anteosaurus Temporal range: Middle Permian (Capitanian), ~262–260 Ma

Genus of anteosaurid synapsid from the Permian

Anteosaurus is an extinct genus of large carnivorous dinocephalian synapsid. It lived at the end of the Guadalupian (Middle Permian) during the Capitanian age, about 262 to 260 million years ago, in what is now South Africa. It is mainly known from cranial remains and few postcranial bones found in rocks of the Tapinocephalus Assemblage Zone. Measuring 5–6 m (16–20 ft) long and weighing about 600 kg (1,300 lb), Anteosaurus was the largest known carnivorous non-mammalian synapsid and the largest terrestrial predator of the Permian period. Occupying the top of the food chain in the Middle Permian, its skull, jaws and teeth show adaptations to capture large prey, such as giant titanosuchid and tapinocephalid dinocephalians and large pareiasaurs.

As in many other dinocephalians the cranial bones of Anteosaurus are pachyostosed (thickened), but to a lesser extent than those of tapinocephalid dinocephalians. In Anteosaurus, pachyostosis mainly occurs in the form of supraorbital protuberances, the horn- or boss-shaped prominences above the eyes. According to some paleontologists this structure would be implicated in intraspecific agonistic behaviour, including head-pushing, probably to compete with conspecifics over mating rights during the mating season. On the contrary, other scientists believe that these adaptations served to reduce cranial stresses on the bones of the skull during predation. Young Anteosaurus had fairly narrow and lean skulls, with the bones of their skull becoming progressively more pachyostosed as they grew, forming the characteristic robust skull roof of the genus.

The study of its inner ear revealed that Anteosaurus was a largely terrestrial, agile predator with highly advanced senses of vision, balance, and coordination. These studies also suggested that Anteosaurus were quite fast and would have been able to outrun competitors and prey alike. Its body was well-suited to projecting itself forward, both in hunting and competition with others. Some researchers have at times proposed a semi-aquatic lifestyle for this animal.

Anteosaurus and all other dinocephalians became extinct about 260 million years ago in a mass extinction at the end of the Capitanian, in which the large bradysaurian pareiasaurs also disappeared. The reasons of this extinction are obscure, although some researchers have shown a temporal association between an important volcanism event in China (known as the Emeishan Traps) and the extinction of dinocephalians.

== Etymology ==
Some confusion surrounds the etymology of the name Anteosaurus, as David Meredith Seares Watson gave no explanation when he described and named Anteosaurus in 1921.

It is often translated as meaning "before lizard", "previous lizard" or "primitive lizard", from the Latin prefix ante meaning "before".

Alternatively, according to Ben Creisler the prefix does not come from the Latin ante, but would refer to Antaios, Latinized as Antaeus or more rarely Anteus, an opponent of Heracles in Greek mythology. The type specimen of Anteosaurus was initially classified in the genus Titanosuchus by Watson, which was named after the Titans of Greek mythology. Once this specimen was recognized as belonging to a different genus, the new name, dedicated to the giant Antaeus, established another connection with Greek mythology.

== Classification and phylogeny ==
Named by Watson in 1921, Anteosaurus was initially classified as a 'Titanosuchian Deinocephalian'. In 1954 Boonstra separated the Titanosuchians in two families: Jonkeridae (a junior synonym of Titanosuchidae) and Anteosauridae. At about the same time Yefremov erected the family Brithopodidae, in which he included the fragmentary Brithopus along with the better known Syodon and Titanophoneus.

Much later, Hopson and Barghusen argued that Brithopodidae should be discontinued and that the Russian taxa Syodon, Titanophoneus and Doliosauriscus should be placed with Anteosaurus within the family Anteosauridae in Anteosauria, to distinguish them from the Tapinocephalians, the other major dinocephalian group in which they included the titanosuchids and the tapinocephalids. They also created the taxa Anteosaurinae, containing Anteosaurus and the Russian forms Titanophoneus and Doliosauriscus, and the Anteosaurini containing only the giant forms Anteosaurus and Doliosauriscus.

Gilian King retained the incorrectly spelled 'Brithopidae' (including the subfamilies 'Brithopinae' and Anteosaurinae) and placed both Brithopidae and Titanosuchidae (including Titanosuchinae and Tapinocephalinae) in the superfamily Anteosauroidea. Ivakhnenko would later consider Brithopodidae as invalid and united Anteosauridae and Deuterosauridae (monotypic; just containing Deuterosaurus) in the superfamily Deuterosauroidea. More recently, Kammerer's systematic revision of the anteosaurs (in which Doliosauriscus become a junior synonym of Titanophoneus) demonstrated that the genus Brithopus is a wastebasket taxon and a nomen dubium, composed of the fossils of indeterminate estemmenosuchid-like tapinocephalians and indeterminate anteosaurians; Brithopodidae was also invalidated.

Kamerrer also performed the first phylogenetic analysis which included all anteosaurid taxa. Along with other subsequent phylogenetic analysis of anteosaurs, this study recovered a monophyletic Anteosauridae containing two major clades, Syodontinae and Anteosaurinae: in Kammerer's analysis, the Chinese Sinophoneus is the most basal anteosaurine and the sister group of an unresolved trichotomy including Titanophoneus potens, T. adamanteus, and Anteosaurus. The following cladogram is based on Kammerer's 2011 analysis:

- Therapsida
  - Dinocephalia
    - Anteosauria
      - - Anteosaurinae
          - - Anteosaurus magnificus
            - Titanophoneus potens
            - Titanophoneus adamanteus
          - Sinophoneus yumenensis
        - Syodontinae
          - - Syodon biarmicum
            - Australosyodon nyaphuli
          - Notosyodon gusevi
      - Archaeosyodon praeventor
      - Microsyodon orlovi
    - Tapinocephalia
      - Tapinocaninus pamelae
      - Estemmenosuchus mirabilis
  - Biarmosuchus tener

When describing the Brazilian anteosaur Pampaphoneus, Cisneros et al. presented another cladogram confirming the recognition of the clades Anteosaurinae and Syodontinae. In the Fig. 2. cladogram of the main paper (which does not include Microsyodon), Titanophoneus adamanteus is recovered as the sister taxon of a clade composed of Titanophoneus potens and Anteosaurus. However, in the four cladograms within the supplementary material/supporting information of this paper, (which included Microsyodon), Anteosaurus is recovered as the sister taxon of both species of Titanophoneus. These four cladograms differ only by the position of Microsyodon within the matrix.

The following cladograms are those from Cisneros et al. (2012); the first is from the main article, which excludes the genus Microsyodon:

- Therapsida
  - Biarmosuchus tener
  - Dinocephalia
    - - Estemmenosuchus uralensis
      - - Ulemosaurus svijagensis
        - Tapinocaninus pamelae
    - Anteosauridae
      - Archaeosyodon praeventor
      - - Anteosaurinae
          - Sinophoneus yumenensis
          - - Titanophoneus adamanteus
            - - Titanophoneus potens
              - Anteosaurus magnificus
        - Syodontinae
          - Pampaphoneus biccai
          - - Notosyodon gusevi
            - - Syodon biarmicum
              - Australosyodon nyaphuli

The following cladogram is based on one of the four within the supporting information of Cisneros et al. (2012), which includes Microsyodon:

- Therapsida
  - Biarmosuchus
  - Dinocephalia
    - - Estemmenosuchus
      - - Ulemosaurus
        - Tapinocaninus
    - Anteosauridae
      - Archaeosyodon
      - - Anteosaurinae
          - Sinophoneus
          - - Anteosaurus
            - - T. potens
              - T. adamanteus
        - Syodontinae
          - Pampaphoneus
          - - Notosyodon
            - - Syodon
              - - Microsyodon
                - Australosyodon

In resdescribing the Chinese anteosaur Sinophoneus, Jun Lui presented a new cladogram in which Sinophoneus is recovered as the most basal Anteosauridae and so excluded from Anteosaurinae. Here Anteosaurus is the sister-taxon of Titanophoneus potens and T. adamanteus. The following cladogram is based on Jun Liu (2013):

- Therapsida
  - Biarmosuchus tener
  - Dinocephalia
    - - Estemmenosuchus uralensis
      - - Ulemosaurus svijagensis
        - Tapinocaninus pamelae
    - Anteosauridae
      - Sinophoneus yumenensis
      - - Archaeosyodon praeventor
        - - Anteosaurinae
            - Anteosaurus magnificus
            - - Titanophoneus adamanteus
              - Titanophoneus potens
          - Syodontinae
            - Pampaphoneus biccai
            - - Notosyodon gusevi
              - - Syodon biarmicum
                - - Australosyodon nyaphuli
                  - Microsyodon orlovi

=== Synonymy ===
==== Genus synonymy ====
As defined by Lieuwe Dirk Boonstra, Anteosaurus is "a genus of anteosaurids in which the postfrontal forms a boss of variable size overhanging the dorso-posterior border of the orbit." On this basis he synonymised six of the seven genera named from the Tapinocephalus zone: Eccasaurus, Anteosaurus, Titanognathus, Dinosuchus, Micranteosaurus, and Pseudanteosaurus. Of these, he considers Dinosuchus and Titanognathus can safely be considered synonyms of Anteosaurus. Eccasaurus, with a holotype of which the cranial material consists of only few typical anteosaurid incisors, appears to be only determinable to family level. The holotypes of Pseudanteosaurus and Micranteosaurus were previously considered to be distinct on account of their small size but is better interpreted as young specimens of Anteosaurus. Boonstra still considered the genus Paranteosaurus as valid, which is defined as a genus of anteosaurids in which the postfrontal is not developed to form a boss. This is probably an example of individual variation and hence another synonym of Anteosaurus.

==== Species synonymy ====
Anteosaurus was once known by a large number of species, but it is currently thought that these merely represent different growth stages of A. magnificus.

We have 32 skulls of Anteosaurus, of which 16 are reasonably well preserved and on them ten species have been named. To differentiate between the species the following main characters have. been used: the number, size and shape of the teeth, skull size, shape and the nature of the pachyostosis. On re-examination it has become clear that the crowns of the teeth are seldom well preserved; basing the count for the dental formula on the preserved roots is unreliable. as this is affected by age and tooth generation; size of skull is a function of age and also possibly sex; skull shape is greatly affected by post-mortem deformation, and the variability in the pachyostosis, which may be specific in some respects, can just as well be the result of...physiological processes. Specific diagnosis consisting of the enumeration of differences of degree in features such as the above can hardly be considered as sufficient indication of the existence of discrete species....A. magnificus thus has the following synonyms: abeli, acutirostrus, crassifrons, cruentus, laticeps, levops, lotzi, major, minor, minusculus, parvus, priscus and vorsteri.

— Boonstra.

==== Possible synonyms ====
Archaeosuchus cairncrossi is a dubious species of anteosaur from the Tapinocephalus Assemblage Zone. It was named by Broom in 1905 on the basis of a partial maxilla. It was interpreted as a titanosuchid by Boonstra, but Kammerer determined it was an anteosaur indistinguishable from Anteosaurus and Titanophoneus. As Anteosaurus magnificus appears to be the only valid large anteosaur in the Tapinocephalus Assemblage Zone, Archaeosaurus cairncrossi is very likely to be a specimen of it, but due to poor preservation, the specimen lacks any features that would allow the synonymy to be proven.

Eccasaurus priscus is a dubious species of anteosaur from the Tapinocephalus Assemblage Zone. It was named by Broom in 1909 on the basis of a fragmentary skeleton, of which Broom only described the humerus. As with Archaeosuchus cairncrossi, Eccasaurus priscus is very likely to be synonymous with Anteosaurus magnificus. As Eccasaurus was named before Anteosaurus and thus has priority, a petition to the ICZN would be needed to conserve the name Anteosaurus magnificus if this synonymy were to be proven.

== Description ==
=== Size ===
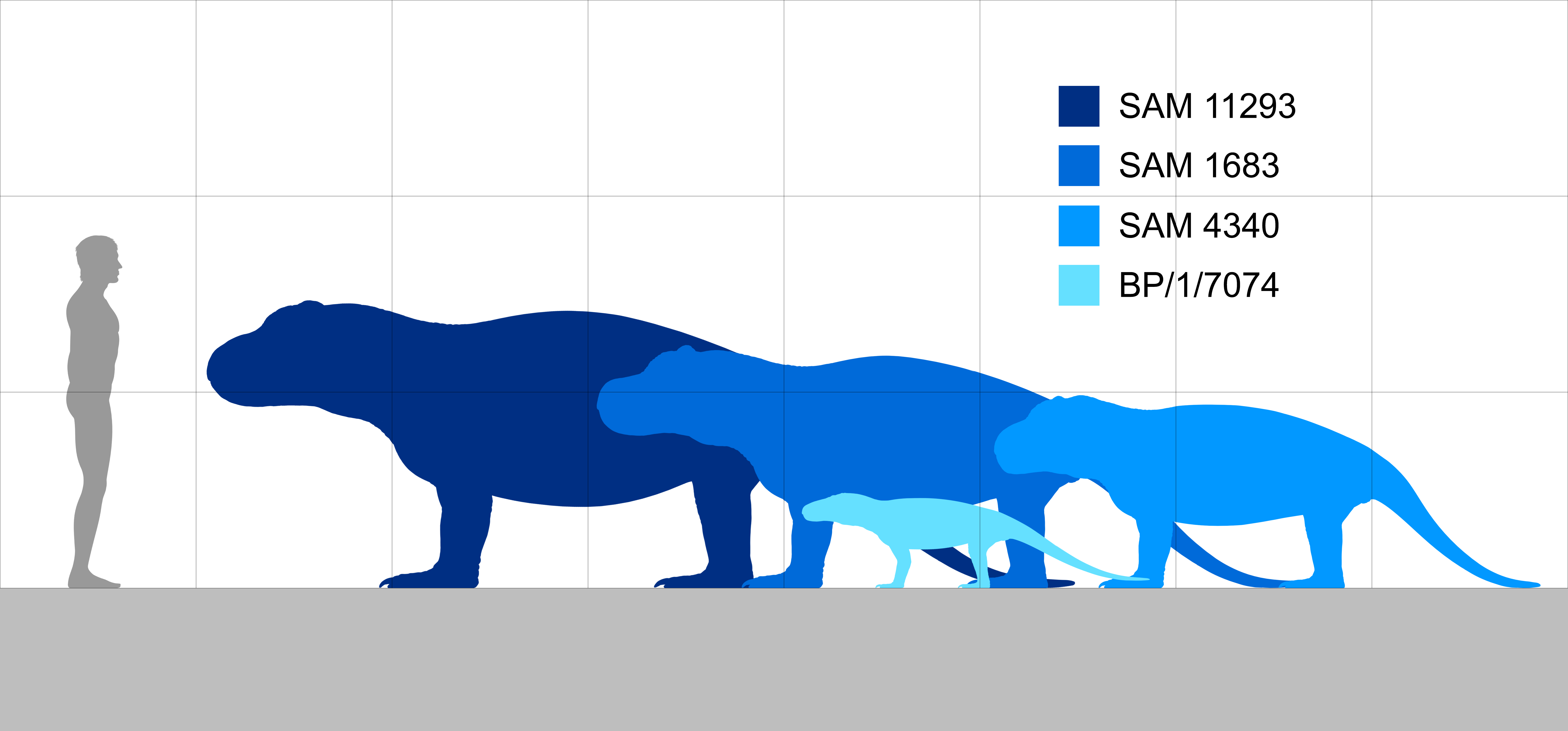
Anteosaurus specimens compared in size to a 1.8 m (5.9 ft) tall human

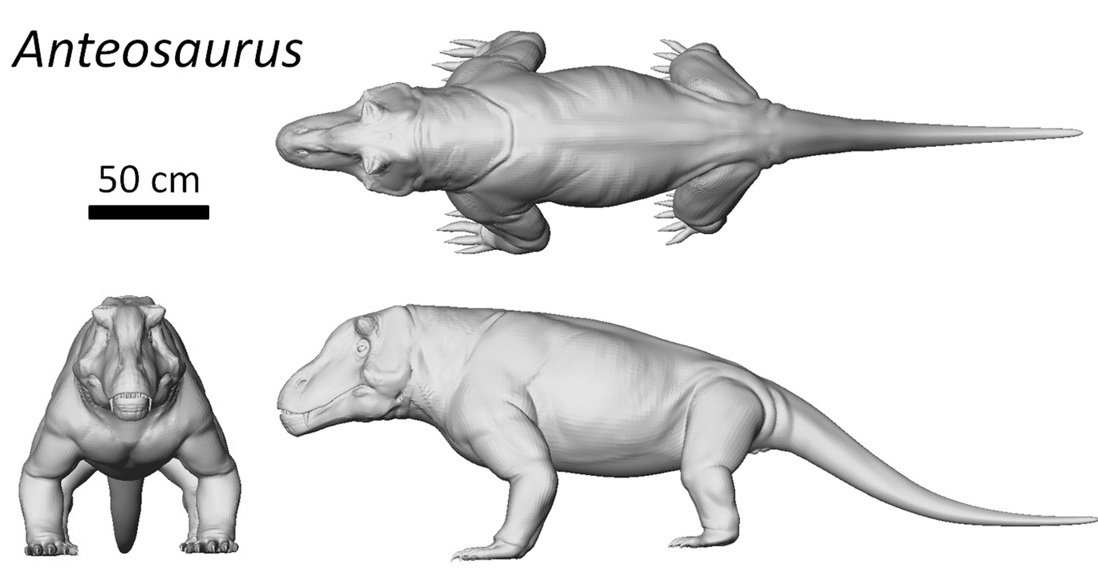
3D sculpted model of Anteosaurus in various views

Anteosaurus is one of the largest known carnivorous non-mammalian synapsids and anteosaurids, measuring around 5–6 m (16–20 ft) long and weighing about 400–600 kg (880–1,320 lb) The juvenile specimen BP/1/7074 has an estimated body mass of about 71 kg (157 lb), showing extreme disparity in size with adult Anteosaurus.

=== Skull ===
The skull of Anteosaurus is large, measuring between 80 and 90 centimetres (31 and 35 in) in the largest specimens (TM265 and SAM-PK-11293), with a heavily pachyostosed skull roof possessing a developed frontal boss. The main features of the skull are the massively pachyostosed postfrontals that form strong horn-like bosses projected laterally. Another boss, characteristically oval in shape, is also present on the angular bone of the lower jaw. The morphology of this angular boss is different between each anteosaurid species. In Anteosaurus the boss is oval in shape, roughly the same thickness throughout its length, with blunt anterior and posterior edges. Some individuals may have also a jugal boss more or less pronounced. Like other anteosaurids, the postorbital bar is strongly curved anteroventrally in such way that the temporal fenestra undercuts the orbit. An additional typical character of anteosaurs is the premaxilla oriented upwards at an angle of about 30–35° with respect to the ventral edge of the maxilla. However, unlike most anteosaurs in which the ventral margin of the premaxilla is directed upwards in a straight line, in Anteosaurus the anterior end of the premaxilla is curved ventrally, producing a concave alveolar border of the region preceding the canines. The skull shows also a concave dorsal snout profile. On the top of the skull, the pineal boss is exclusively formed by the parietals as is the case in other anteosaurines (and in more basal anteosaurs such as Archaeosyodon and Sinophoneus) while this boss is made up of both frontals and parietals in the other anteosaur subgroup, the syodontines. Contrary to what is observed in the latter, the frontals and the pineal boss of the anteosaurines do not participate in the attachment site of the mandibular adductor musculature. On the palate, the transverse processes of pterygoids are massively enlarged at their distal end, giving them a palmate shape in ventral view, as is the case in Titanophoneus and Sinophoneus. As in other anteosaurs, two prominent palatal bosses carried several small teeth. In Anteosaurus (and in other anteosaurines), these two palatal bosses are well separated from each other while in syodontines the two bosses are very close or interconnected.

It is estimated that approximately 48% of the anteosaurid's endocast volume would have housed non-neural tissue.

==== Dentition ====
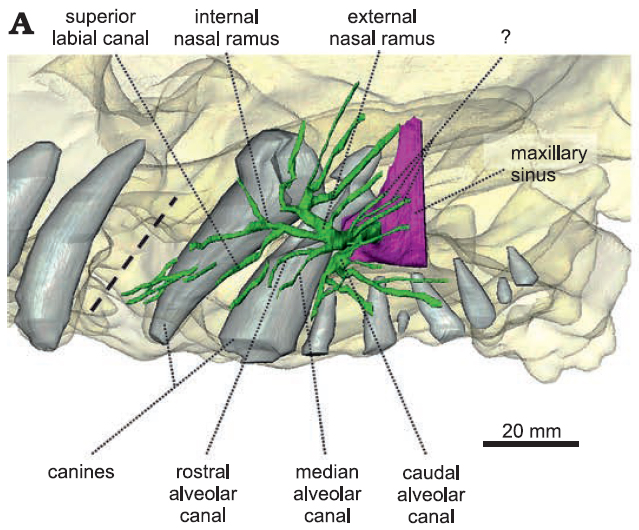
Maxillary canal system

The dentition of Anteosaurus is composed of long to very long incisors, large canines, and some small postcanines. In addition, some small teeth are present on both palatine bosses. There are five upper and four lower incisors, but even in the same skull the number of teeth on either side is mostly different. The incisors intermesh together. Like other anteosaurids, the first incisor of each premaxilla form together a pair that passes in between the lower pair formed by the first incisor of each dentary. The canines are well individualized. The upper canines are large and very massive, but is proportionally shorter than in some gorgonopsians of the Late Permian. The upper and lower canines did not intermesh. When the jaws were closed, the lower canines passed on the lingual side of the fifth upper incisor. Behind the canines, there are 4 to 8 small and relatively robust postcanines. Although smaller than the incisors and canines, these postcanines are proportionately more massive, with a thick base and a more conical general shape. Some postcanines of the upper jaws have a peculiar implantation. The most posterior are canted postero-laterally: the last three to four postcanine teeth are out-of-plane with the rest of the tooth row, being directed strongly backwards and somewhat outwards. Other smaller teeth were located on two prominences of the palate, the palatal bosses, which are semilunar or reniform in shape. These palatal teeth were recurved and most often implanted in a single curved row (a specimen however shows a double row). These teeth were used to hold meat while swallowing.

=== Postcranial skeleton ===
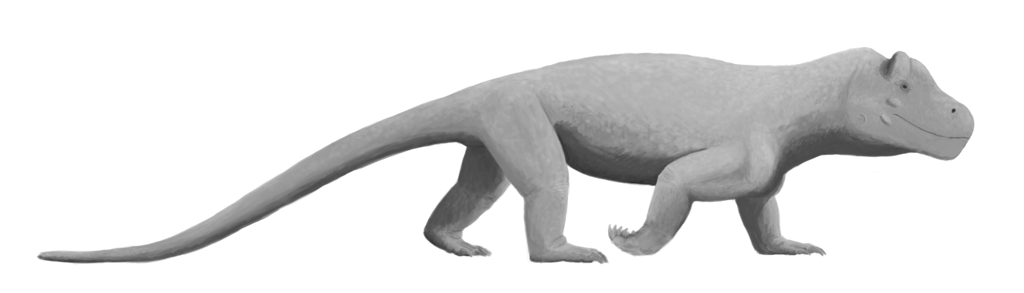
Reconstruction of Anteosaurus magnificus based on the skeletal proportions of the Russian anteosaur Titanophoneus potens.

Postcranial material of Anteosaurus is very rare and no complete skeletons are known. Only some associated or isolated bones (girdles and limbs bones, and some vertebrae), and more rarely some articulated remains have been found. An articulated left hand belonging to a juvenile shows that the manual phalangeal formula is 2-3-3-3-3, as in mammals. This hand (as well as an incomplete foot) was first considered by Lieuwe Dirk Boonstra as belonging to the right side of the animal; he himself later corrected this mistake. He also thought that digit III had four phalanges. Tim Rowe and J.A. van den Heever later showed that this was not the case, this digit having three phalanges. The manus has a much smaller a digit I (the innermost) than the other digits. The digits III to V are the longest, with digit V (the outermost) being the most robust. The foot is only partially known, but also has a smaller digit I. Based on more complete skeletons of the Russian anteosaur Titanophoneus, the limbs would be rather long with a somewhat semi-erect posture. The tail is longer than in the herbivorous tapinocephalid dinocephalians.

== Paleobiology ==
=== Skull variations and agonistic behaviour ===
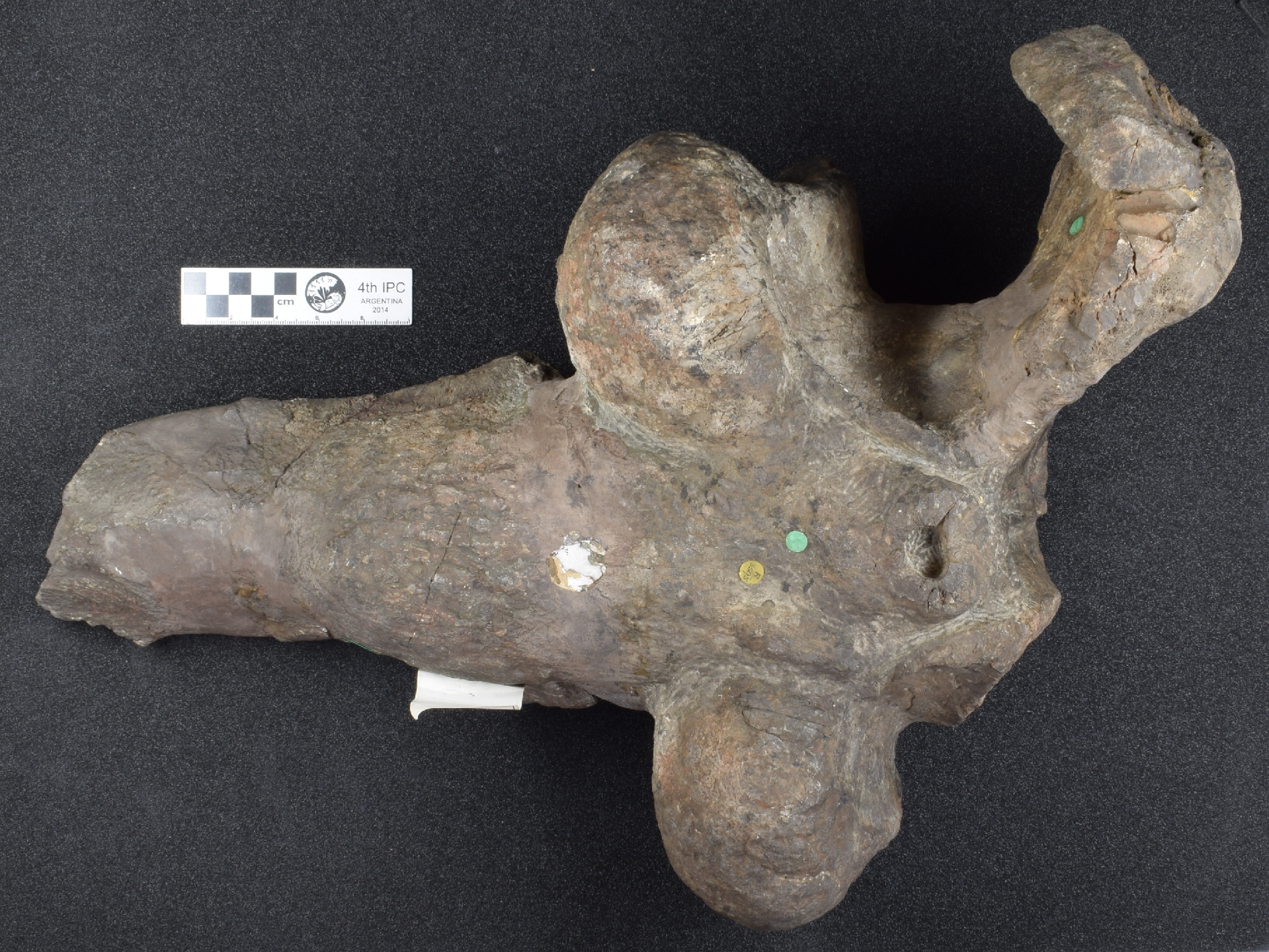
Holotype (BMNH R3595) skull roof of A. magnificus. In this specimen the postfrontal bosses are particularly massive. This skull was discovered near Beaufort West in the Western Cape Province.

The numerous skulls of Anteosaurus show a wide range of variation in cranial proportions and extent of pachyostosis. Most specifically the development of the postfrontal "horns" and the frontal boss is particularly variable between specimens. Some have both the "horns" and the boss massively pachyostosed, others have well-developed "horns" but a weak or nonexistent boss, and some others have a very weakly developed "horns" and boss. Even the heavily pachyostosed specimens have individual variations: some have "horns" relatively small compared to the boss, while others have very massive postfrontal "horns". Some of these variations can be attributed to ontogenetic changes. In adults specimens the variations of the development of the frontal boss (to very weak to very strong) may be a sexually dimorphic feature, because in dinocephalians the frontal bosses have been implicated in head-butting and pushing behaviour.

Various authors have suggested the existence of agonistic behavior in Anteosaurus based on head-butting and/or demonstration involving the canines. According to Herbert H. Barghusen, Anteosaurus did not use its teeth during intraspecific combat because both animals would be capable of doing severe damage to each other with their massive canines and incisors; the alternative of head-butting would've reduced the risk of fatal injuries in both combatants. The contact area of the skull roof during head combat included the most posterior part of the nasal bones, part of the prefrontal, and the entire frontal and postfrontal on either side. The thickened and laterally extended postfrontals horn-like bosses reduced the chance of the head of one opponent slipping past the head of the other.

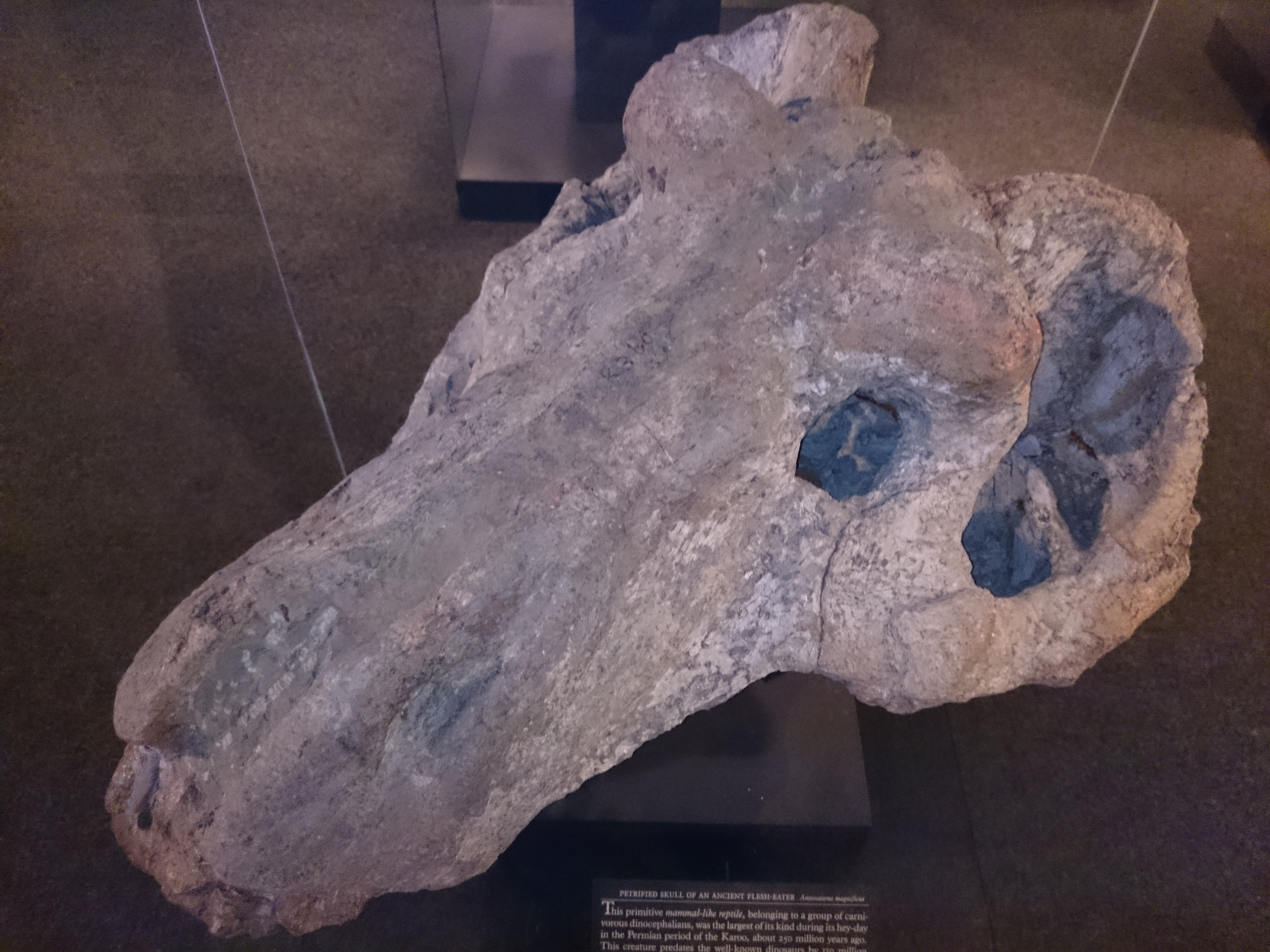
Skull of A. magnificus (SAM-PK-K360) with strong postfrontal bosses but no frontal boss. This specimen, exhibited in the Iziko South African Museum of Cape Town, comes from Nuwelande, near Fraserburg in Northern Cape province.

More recently, Julien Benoit and colleagues have shown that the head of Anteosaurus had a natural posture that was less tilted downwards than that of tapinocephalids and that, unlike the latter, it does not line up ideally with the vertebral column, being not optimized for head-to-head combat. This character, also associated with less-developed pachyostosis compared to tapinocephalids, along with the retention of large canines, led these authors to suggest other agonistic behavior in which Anteosaurus used its large canines for displays and/or during confrontation involving bites.

According to Christian Kammerer, the pachyostosis of Anteosaurus would have mainly allowed the skull to resist the cranial stress generated by the powerful external adductor muscles during the bite on a large prey, as has been suggested in other macropredators with a thickened supraorbital region such as rubidgeine gorgonopsians, mosasaurs, some thalattosuchians, sebecosuchians, rauisuchians and various large carnivorous dinosaurs.

All these authors, however, do not exclude the possibility of this pachyostosis having multiple uses and a head-butting behaviour in Anteosaurus which required less energy than that of the Tapinocephalidae.

=== Ontogeny ===
Ashley Kruger and team in 2016 described a juvenile specimen of Anteosaurus (BP/1/7074), providing details into the ontogeny of this species. Analyzed allometry between this specimen and others suggests that the cranial ontogeny of Anteosaurus was characterized by a rapid growth in the temporal region, a significant difference in the development of the postorbital bar and suborbital bar between juveniles and adults, as well as significant pachyostosis during development, which ultimately modified the skull roof of adults; pachyostosis was responsible for thickening important skull bones such as the frontal and postfrontal, which were of great importance in the overall paleobiology and behavior of Anteosaurus. Kruger and team noted that these features had extreme differences in juvenile and mature Anteosaurus individuals.

In 2021 Mohd Shafi Bhat histologically studied several skeletal remains of specimens referred to Anteosaurus, and found three growth stages: the first growth stage is characterized by the predominance of highly vascularized, uninterrupted fibrolamellar bone tissue in the inner bone cortex, which suggests rapid formation of new bone during early ontogeny. A second stage of growth in Anteosaurus is represented by periodic or seasonal interruptions in the bone formation, indicated by the deposition of lines of arrested growth. The third and last reported growth stage by the team features the development of lamellar bone tissue with rest lines in the peripheral part of the bone cortex, which indicates that Anteosaurus experienced a slowdown of growth in advanced age.

=== Habitat preference and diet ===
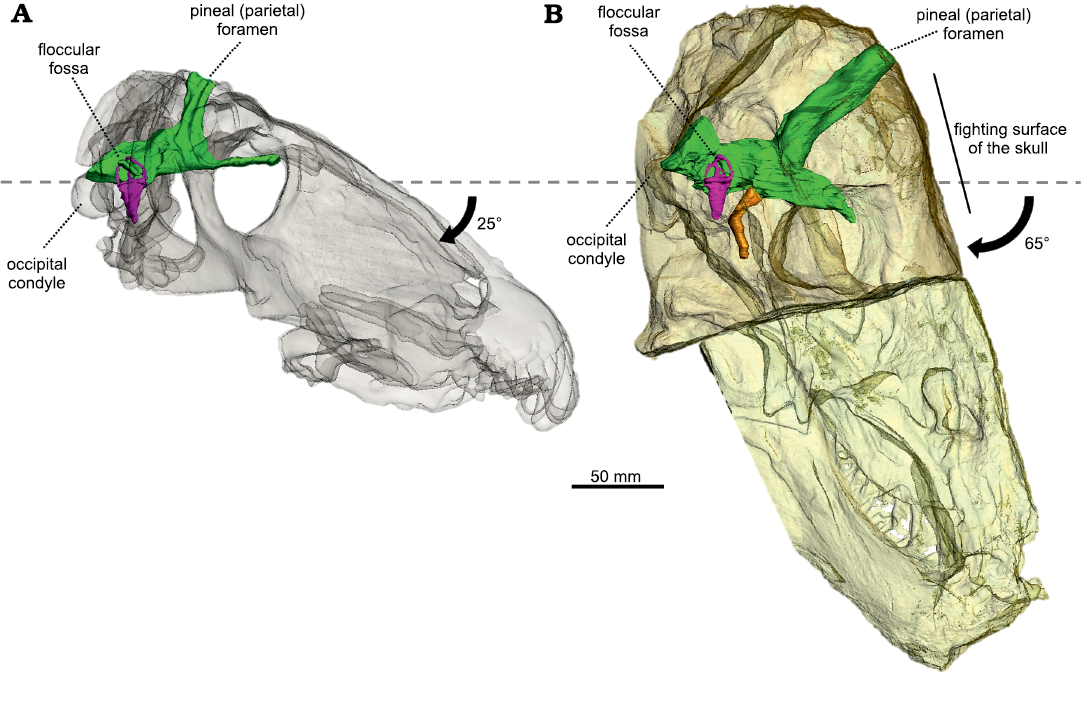
Semi-transparent 3D reconstructions (based on X-ray micro-computed tomography) of the skulls of dinocephalians Anteosaurus magnificus (A, BP/1/7074) and Moschognathus whaitsi (B, AM4950) from the middle Permian of South Africa, aligned on the plane of their lateral semicircular canal. The black arrow indicates the tilting of the long axis of the skull compared to the plane of the lateral semicircular canal.

Boonstra in 1954 indicated that the overall dentition of Anteosaurus—characterized by prominent canines, elongated incisors, and relatively weak postcanines—reflects a specialized carnivore, and that this anteosaurid did not rely on chewing and shearing when feeding, but being well-adapted for tearing flesh chunks from prey. In addition, Boonstra noted that some of the consumed flesh was likely held and/or torn by the recurved palatal dentition. In 1955 he indicated that anteosaurids had a crawling locomotion similar to crocodiles, based mostly on their hip joint and femur morphology, useful in a semiaquatic setting.

In 2008 Mikhail Ivakhnenko analyzed a vast majority of Permian therapsid skulls, and suggested that anteosaurs, such as Anteosaurus, were strict, semiaquatic piscivorous (fish-eater) synapsids, mostly similar to modern-day otters. Christian F. Kammerer in 2011 questioned this proposal, given that numerous anatomical traits of anteosaurs make this lifestyle unlikely. The typical dentition of piscivorous animals include elongate, numerous, strongly recurved, and very sharp teeth in order to hold and kill fast-moving fish prey. In addition, the jaws of piscivores are commonly elongated and narrow for greater strike speed and minimal water resistance when capturing prey. In contrast, the skull morphology of most anteosaurs—specifically anteosaurids—is extremely robust with deep jaws, and the teeth are bulbous and blunt, with only the canines being significantly recurved. Kammerer instead indicated that anteosaurids like Anteosaurus likely preyed on large terrestrial dinocephalians, such as the gigantic titanosuchids and tapinocephalids which they coexisted with. He also noted that anteosaurid teeth are mostly similar to that of large tyrannosaurids (postcanines robust bases, faceted surfaces, and obliquely angled serrations), whose dentition is interpreted as being specialized for bone-crunching. Accordingly, bone-crunching may also have been employed by anteosaurids, being an important component in their diet.

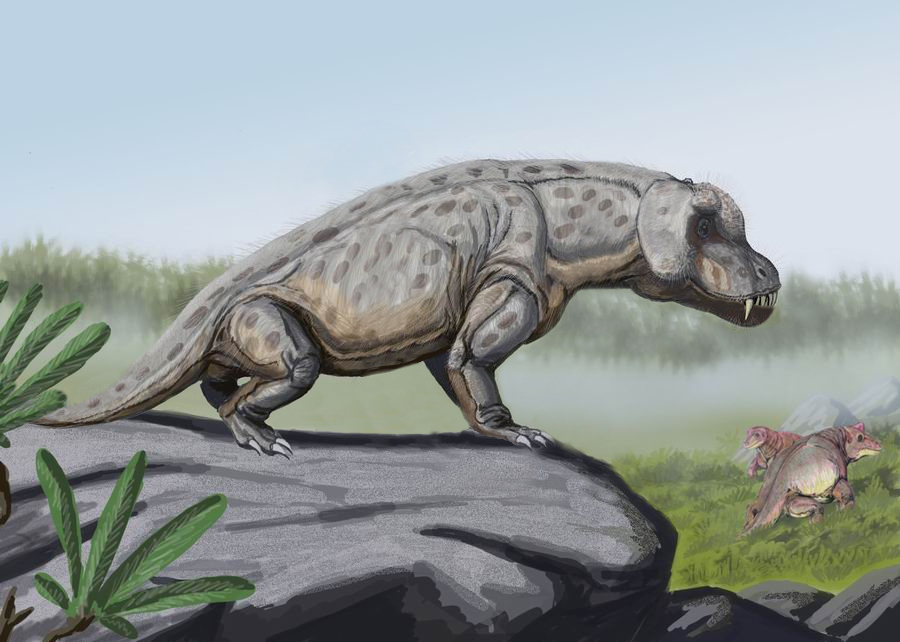
Reconstruction of Anteosaurus in a terrestrial paleoenvironment

In 2020 Kévin Rey with colleagues analyzed stable oxygen isotope compositions of phosphate from teeth and bones from pareiasaurs and Anteosaurus, in order to estimate their affinity for water dependence. Obtained results showed similar δ18Op values between pareiasaurs, Anteosaurus, and therocephalians, to those of a wide range of extant terrestrial species, indicating a terrestrial preference for these synapsids. However, it was noted that the δ18Op values were slightly lower in Anteosaurus, casting doubt for this interpretation. Nevertheless, Rey with colleagues concluded that a larger sample size may result in a more robust conclusion for Anteosaurus.

Bhat and team in 2021 noted that most skeletal elements of Anteosaurus are characterized by relatively thickened bone walls, extensive secondary bone reconstruction and the complete infilling of the medullary cavity. Combined, these traits indicate that Anteosaurus was mostly adapted for a terrestrial life-style. However, an examined radius and femur have open medullary cavities with struts of bony trabeculae. The team suggested that it is conceivable that Anteosaurus may have also occasionally inhabited shallow and short-lived pools, in a similar manner to modern-day hippopotamuses.

An in-depth study of the brain of juvenile Anteosaurus specimen BP/1/7074 published in 2021 disproves the idea that these dinocephalians were sluggish, crocodilian-like predators. Studies by Benoit et al. using x-ray imaging and 3-D reconstructions showcase that the species were fast, agile animals in spite of their great size: the inner ears were larger than those of its closest relatives and competitors, suggesting that Anteosaurus was well-suited to the role of an apex predator that could outrun both its rivals and prey alike. The area of its brain responsible for coordinating the movements of the eyes with the head was also determined to have been exceptionally large, an important feature to ensure that they could track their prey accurately. As a result, Anteosaurus is thought to be well-adapted to pursuing land-based prey.

=== Metabolism ===
In 2017, Kévin Rey and colleagues analyzed oxygen isotopes to find thermometabolism among therapsid clades. The δ18Op values of Anteosaurus (and other contemporary therapsids of the lower Tapinocephalus AZ) recovered it as an ectothermic therapsid. Analysis on bony labyrinths and semicircular canals by Araújo and colleagues estimated non-neotherapsid therapsids had a body temperature between 24.2–29.0 °C (75.6–84.2 °F), suggesting ectothermy for dinocephalians.

== Geographic and stratigraphic range ==
=== South Africa ===
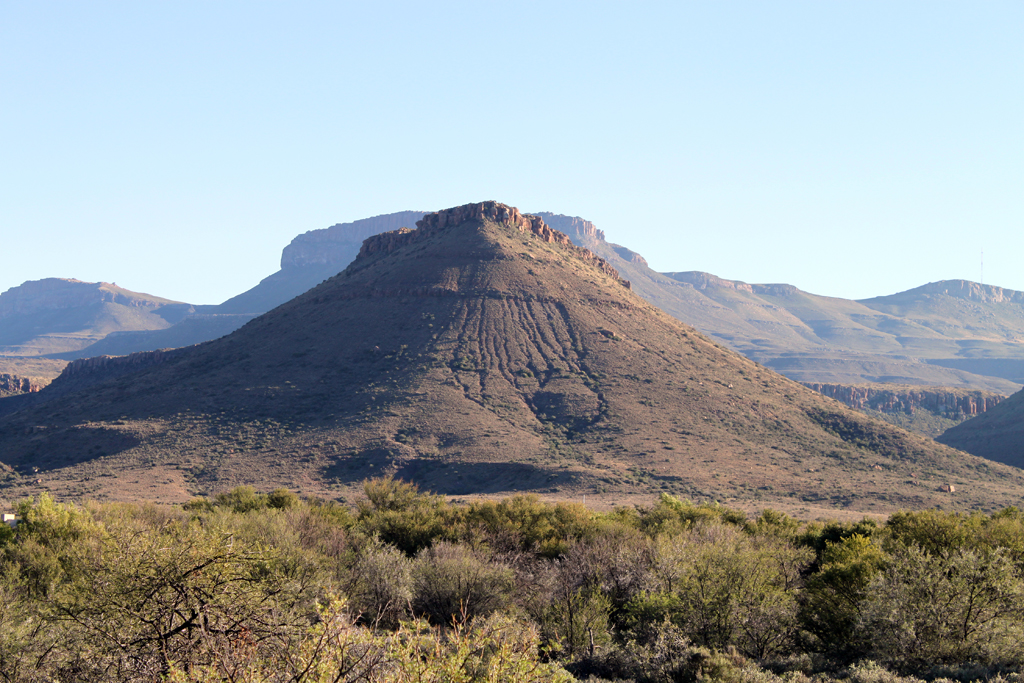
Hill with strata of the Abrahamskraal and Teekloof formations in the Karoo National Park near Beaufort West, Western Cape Province

The fossils of Anteosaurus magnificus come mainly from the Abrahamskraal Formation as well as from the basal part of the Teekloof Formation of the Beaufort Group in the Karoo Basin, South Africa. The species appears in the middle part of the Abrahamskraal Formation (Koornplaats member) and continues in the rest of the formation (Swaerskraal, Moordenaars, and Karelskraal members). Its last representatives come from the base of the Teekloof Formation (in the lower strata of the Poortjie member). More than 30 localities are known, mostly being localized in the Western Cape province (Beaufort West, Prince Albert and Laingsburg). Some localities are also known near the towns of Sutherland and Fraserburg in the southern end of the Northern Cape province (Karoo Hoogland). At least one specimen (BP/1/7061) was found near Grahamstown in the Eastern Cape Province (Makana). (Note: This specimen was originally discovered in the Koonap Formation which was considered a lateral equivalent of the Abrahamskraal Formation east of the 24th meridian east. The two formations were amalgamated in 2016 because the two were lithologically indistinguishable.) A skull discovered in the same province in 2001 was also tentatively ascribed to a juvenile specimen of Anteosaurus. However, the complete preparation of this skull revealed that it belonged to a tapinocephalid dinocephalian. (Note: This skull was first attributed to Moschops capensis before being reassigned to Moschognathus whaitsi in 2020 by Saniye Neumann in a thesis.)

The Middle Permian Abrahamskraal Formation is biostratigraphically subdivided in two faunal zone: the older, mostly Wordian-age Eodicynodon Assemblage Zone, and the younger Tapinocephalus Assemblage Zone, which is mainly Capitanian in age. Anteosaurus belongs to the latter, which is characterized by the abundance and the diversification of the dinocephalians therapsids. Since 2020, this zone is divided into two subzones: a lower Eosimops – Glanosuchus subzone and an upper Diictodon – Styracocephalus subzone, both of which contain Anteosaurus fossils. Like all other South African dinocephalians, Anteosaurus was presumed to have gone extinct at the top of the Abrahamskraal Formation. However, remains of Anteosaurus and two other dinocephalian genera (Titanosuchus and Criocephalosaurus) have been found in the basal portion of the Poortjie Member of the overlying Teekloof Formation. These discoveries greatly expanded both the stratigraphic range of these three dinocephalian genera and the upper limit of the Tapinocephalus Assemblage Zone that reaches the base of the Teekloof Formation. In the latter, the remains of these three dinocephalians were found in an interval of 30 metres (98 ft) above a level dated to 260.259 ± 0.081 million years ago, representing the Upper Capitanian. Other radiometric dating have constrained the base of the Tapinocephalus Assemblage Zone (Leeuvlei Member in the middle part of the Abrahamskraal Formation) to be older than 264.382 ± 0.073 Ma and placed the boundary between the two subzones at 262.03 ± 0.15 Ma. The upper part of the Abrahamskraal Formation (top of the Karelskraal Member) gave an age of 260.226 ± 0.069 Ma which is consistent with the age of 260.259 ± 0.081 of the base of the Teekloof Formation. These datings show that the age of the Tapinocephalus Assemblage Zone extends from Late Wordian to Late Capitanian (based on Guadalupian radiometric ages obtained in 2020 from the type locality of the Guadalupe Mountains in west Texas).

=== Possible Russian occurrence ===
Anteosaurus is possibly present in Russia based on a fragmentary cranial remain found in the 19th century in the Republic of Tatarstan (Alexeyevsky District). This specimen, firstly interpreted as a snout boss of a dicynodont (named Oudenodon rugosus), was later correctly identified by Ivan Yefremov as an angular boss of an anteosaurid. The shape of this boss clearly differs from those of other Russian anteosaurids, so this specimen was attributed to a new species of the genus Titanophoneus (and named Titanophoneus rugosus). More recently, Christian Kammerer showed that the shape of this boss differs markedly from the lenticular bosses of the Russian anteosaurs T. potens and T. adamanteus. In contrast the angular boss of T. rugosus is very similar to the Anteosaurus morphotype, so this specimen may be the first representative of Anteosaurus from Russia. The dermal sculpturing of the boss, with prominent furrows, is different from that observed in few well preserved A. magnificus specimens. According to Kammerer, as the range of variation in dermal sculpturing between Anteosaurus individuals is not well known, it is more reasonable to provisionally consider Titanophoneus rugosus as a nomen dubium (maybe an Anteosaurus sp.). Only the discovery of more complete Russian specimens with the rugosus morphotype will clarify the relationship of this taxon with Anteosaurus.

== Paleoenvironment ==
=== Paleogeography and paleoclimate ===
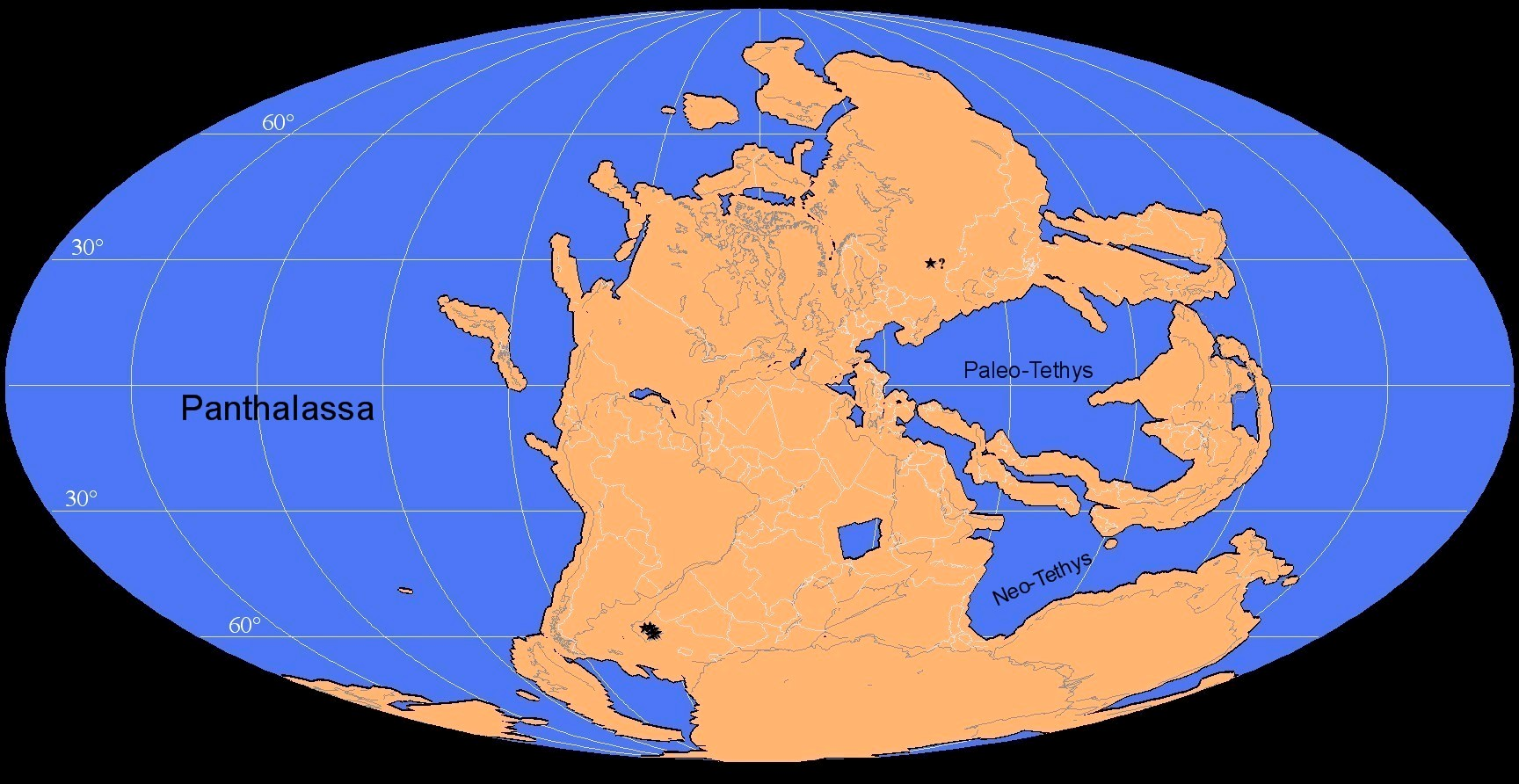
Map of Earth during the Guadalupian showing the paleogeographic distribution of the genus Anteosaurus

At the time of Anteosaurus, most of the landmasses were united in one supercontinent, Pangaea. It was roughly C-shaped: its northern (Laurasia) and southern (Gondwana) parts were connected to the west, but separated to the east by a very large oceanic bay – the Tethys. A long string of microcontinents, grouped under the name of Cimmeria, divided the Tethys in two: the Paleo-Tethys in the north, and the Neo-Tethys in the south. The region that would become the South African Karoo was located much further south than today, around the 60th parallel south. Although located close to the Antarctic Circle, the climate prevailing at this latitude during most of the Permian was a temperate one, with distinct seasons. There are uncertainties about the temperatures that prevailed in South Africa during the Middle Permian. Previously, this region of the world had undergone significant glaciation during the Upper Carboniferous. Subsequently, the Lower Permian had first seen the retreat of glaciers and the emergence of a subpolar tundra and taiga-like vegetation (dominated by Botrychiopsis and Gangamopteris), with the subsequent introduction of warmer and wetter climatic conditions that allowed the development of the Mesosaurus fauna and the Glossopteris flora. The scientists who studied the climate of that time found very different results for the ancient Karoo's thermal ranges. At the end of the 1950s, Edna Plumstead compared the Karoo to today's Siberia or Canada, with a highly seasonal climate including very cold winters and temperate summers supporting the Glossopteris flora, which would have been restricted to sheltered basins. Subsequent studies, mainly based on climate models, also suggested a cold temperate climate with high thermal amplitude between summer (15 to 20 °C (59 to 68 °F)) and winter (−20 to −25 °C (−4 to −13 °F)). More recent studies also indicate a temperate climate, but with much less severe winters than those previously suggested. Keddy Yemane thus suggested that the vast river system and the many giant lakes present at the time throughout southern Africa must have significantly moderated the continentality of the Karoo climate during most of the Permian. Paleobotanical studies focusing on the characteristic morphology of plant leaves and the growth rings of fossil wood also indicate a seasonal climate with summer temperatures of up to 30 °C (86 °F) and frost-free winters. According to Richard Rayner, the high southern latitudes experienced very hot and humid summers, with an average of 18 hours of light per day for more than four months during which precipitation was comparable to the annual amount falling in the present-day tropics. These conditions were extremely conducive to rapid growth in plants such as Glossopteris. Glossopteris' habit of losing its leaves at the beginning of the bad season would be linked to a shorter duration of daylight rather than the existence of very cold winter temperatures. From the geochemical study of sediments from several Karoo sites, Kay Scheffler also obtains a temperate climate (with mean annual temperatures of about 15 to 20 °C (59 to 68 °F)), with frost-free winters, but with an increase in aridity during the Middle Permian.

=== Paleoecology ===
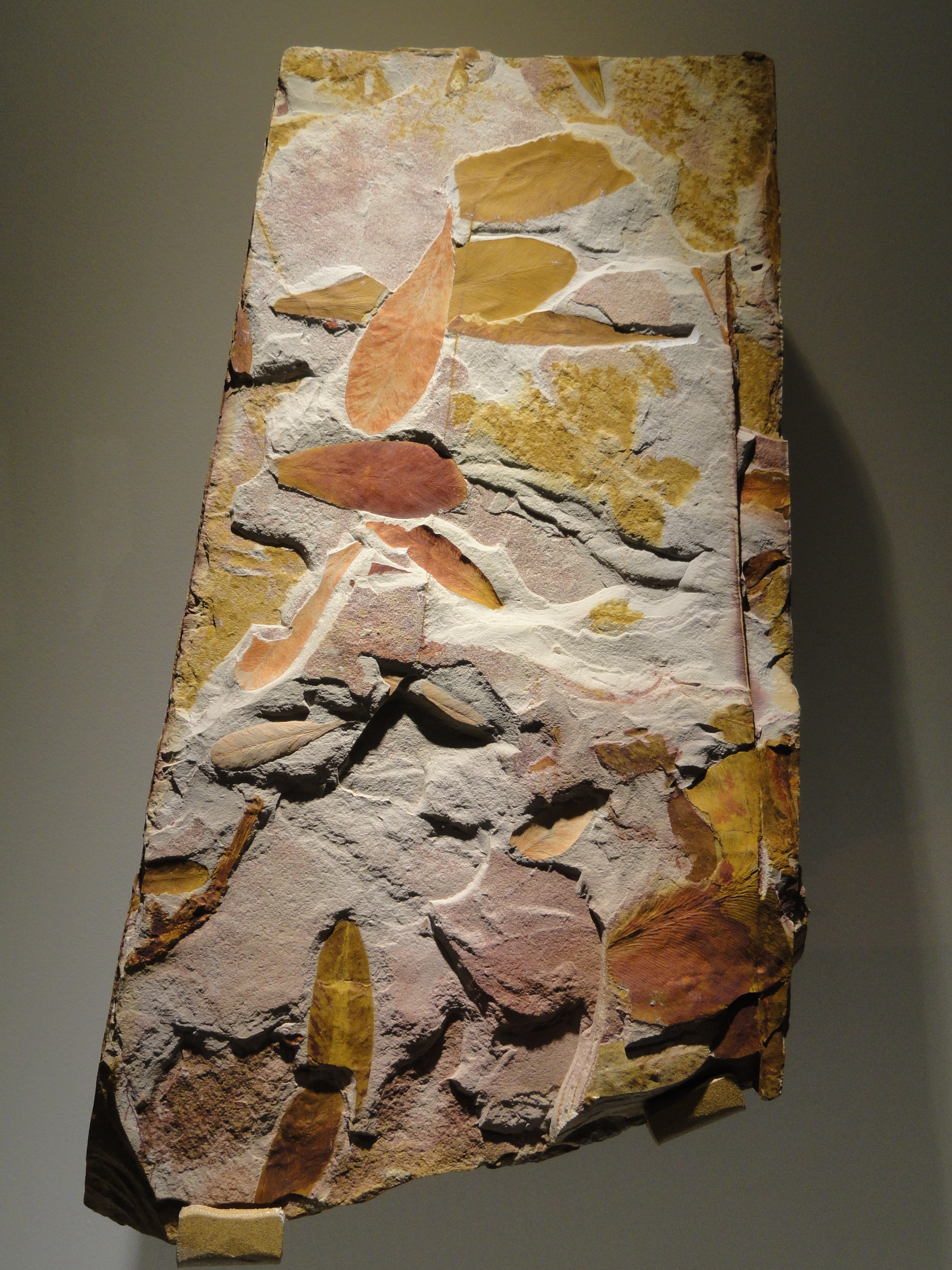
Glossopteris leaves from Permian sediments of the Dunedoo area, New South Wales, Australia. Glossopteris was widespread in the Gondwanan part of Pangaea.

The sediments of the Abrahamskraal Formation consists of a succession of sandstones, versicolor siltstones, and mudstones, which were deposited by large rivers that flowed from south to north from the Gondwanide mountain range. These large rivers of variable sinuosity drained into a vast alluvial plain that sloped gently down to the northeast toward the Ecca sea (a former landlocked sea), while in receding phase. The landscape was composed of marshy land interrupted by rivers, lakes, woods, and forests. Many fossil traces (footprints, ripple marks, mudcracks) indicate that swampy areas, which were the most extensive habitat, were frequently exposed to the open air and seldom were deeply flooded. The flora was dominated by the deciduous pteridosperm Glossopteris, which formed woodlands and large forests concentrated along the streams and on the uplands. Large relatives of modern horsetails (2–3 m (6.6–9.8 ft) high), such as Schizoneura and Paraschizoneura, formed bamboo-like stands that grew in and around swamps. Herbaceous horsetails (Phyllotheca) and ferns carpeted the undergrowth and small lycopods occupied the wetter areas.

Aquatic fauna included the bivalve Palaeomutela, the palaeonisciformes fishes Atherstonia, Bethesdaichthys, Blourugia, Namaichthys and Westlepis, and large freshwater predators like the temnospondyl amphibians Rhinesuchoides and Rhinesuchus. The terrestrial fauna was particularly diverse and dominated by the therapsids. (Note: Several taxa from the lower part of the Tapinocephalus zone, such as the biarmosuchian Pachydectes, the dicynodont Lanthanostegus, and the gorgonopsian Phorcys, have been found in strata located several hundred meters below the oldest known specimens of Anteosaurus. This particular fauna could represent a new zone or sub-zone not yet recognized as such and located between the Eodicynodon and Tapinocephalus Assemblage Zones.) Anteosaurus occupied the top of the food chain, sharing its environment with many other carnivorous tetrapods. Other large predatory animals included the lion-sized Lycosuchid therocephalians Lycosuchus and Simorhinella, and the Scylacosaurid therocephalian Glanosuchus. Medium-sized carnivores were represented by the basal biarmosuchian Hipposaurus, the more derived biarmosuchian Bullacephalus, the scylacosaurids Ictidosaurus, Scylacosaurus, and Pristerognathus, and the small and basal gorgonopsian Eriphostoma. The small predator guild (mainly insectivorous forms) included the therocephalians Alopecodon, and Pardosuchus, the small monitor-like varanopids Elliotsmithia, Heleosaurus, and Microvaranops, the millerettid Broomia, the procolophonomorph Australothyris, and the lizard-like Eunotosaurus of uncertain affinities (variously considered as a parareptile, a pantestudine or a caseid synapsid).

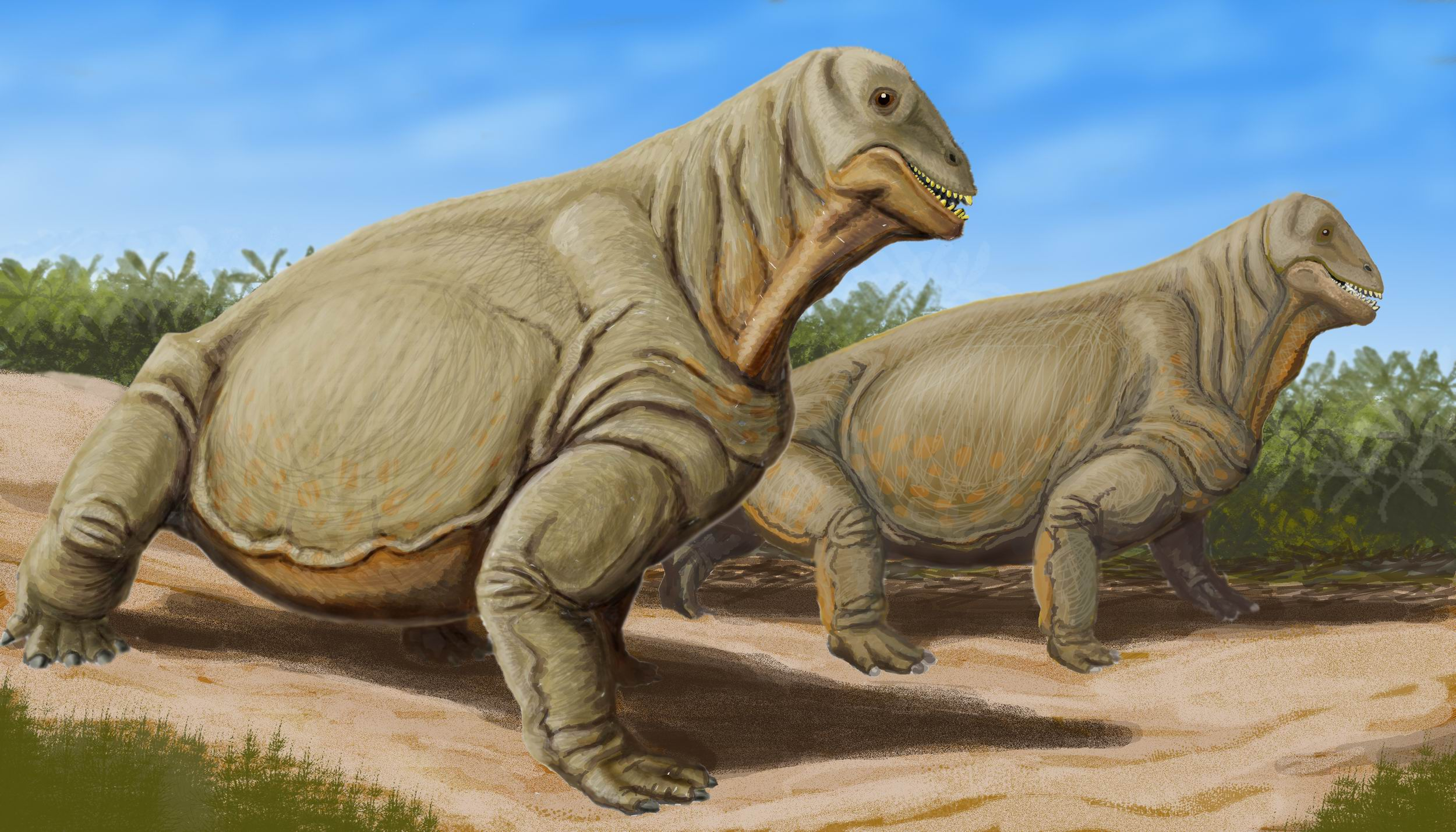
Moschops capensis, a large tapinocephalid that coexisted with Anteosaurus.

Herbivores were also numerous and diverse. Large-sized vegetarians were mainly represented by numerous dinocephalians including the tapinocephalids Agnosaurus, Criocephalosaurus, Mormosaurus, Moschognathus, Moschops, Riebeeckosaurus, Struthiocephalus, Struthionops, and Tapinocephalus, the Styracocephalid Styracocephalus, and the huge titanosuchids Jonkeria and Titanosuchus. Other large herbivores that were not synapsids included the large bradysaurian pareiasaurs represented by Bradysaurus, Embrithosaurus and Nochelesaurus, whose dentition very different from that of herbivorous dinocephalians indicates that the two groups occupied clearly distinct ecological niches. The small to medium-sized forms included basal anomodonts (the non-dicynodonts Anomocephalus, Galechirus, Galeops and Galepus) and numerous dicynodonts (Brachyprosopus, Colobodectes, Pristerodon, and the Pylaecephalids Diictodon, Eosimops, Prosictodon, and Robertia,).

== Extinction ==
Anteosaurus went extinct around 260 Ma, coinciding with the Capitanian mass extinction event, also known as the Middle Permian extinction event. This extinction also saw the extinction of the entire dinocephalian clade. The mass extinction was suggested to have been caused by volcanism, declining sea levels, or competition. However, competition can be ruled out as new taxa did not appear in Karoo until after the extinction of the dinocephalians.

Volcanism has been attributed to the Emeishan Traps of southern China, which was most active between 263 and 259.1 Ma. The basalt piles from which currently cover an area of 250,000 to 500,000 km^{2}, although the original volume of the basalts may have been anywhere from 500,000 km^{3} to over 1,000,000 km^{3}. Emeishan Traps was thought to have erupted in two pulses, each pulse lasted about 300,000 years. During the first pulse, warming was estimated at 2.3 °C, while the warming in the second pulse was estimated at 1.3 °C. The interbedded of reefs and other marine sediments in basalt piles indicate Emeishan volcanism initially developed underwater; terrestrial outflows of lava occurred only later in the large igneous province's period of activity. During these eruptions, there were high doses of toxic mercury, the increased mercury concentrations are coincident with the negative carbon isotope excursion, indicating a common volcanic cause. Furthermore, coronene enrichment at the Guadalupian-Lopingian boundary further confirms the existence of massive volcanic activity. Coronene can only form at extremely high temperatures created either by extraterrestrial impacts or massive volcanism, with the former being ruled out because of an absence of iridium anomalies coeval with mercury and coronene anomalies.

The eruptions of the Emeishan Traps may have caused extinctions of terrestrial fauna through climate change, defoliation resulting from acid rain, toxicity, short term cooling, volcanic induced darkness, and reduced photosynthesis. While the positive change in δ^{13}C has been documented in uppermost Tapinocephalus AZ, the lack of change in the abundance of oxygen isotopes suggests no significant temperature changes during the extinction interval despite the increase in aridity.

Widespread demise of reefs have been linked to marine regression. The Guadalupian-Lopingian boundary coincided with one of the notable first-order marine regressions of the Phanerozoic. Fossil evidence of marine regression comes from evaporites and terrestrial facies overlying marine carbonate across the boundary.

== See also ==
- List of therapsids
