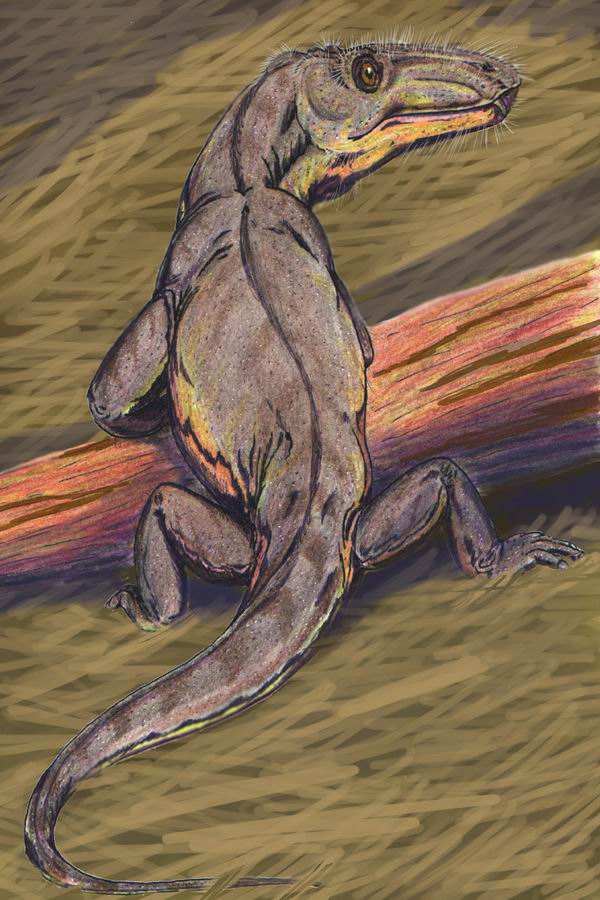
- Syodon

Scientific classification
- Kingdom: Animalia
- Phylum: Chordata
- Clade: Synapsida
- Clade: Therapsida
- Suborder: †Dinocephalia
- Family: †Anteosauridae
- Subfamily: †Syodontinae; Ivakhnenko, 1994

Subgroups
- †Australosyodon; †Microsyodon; †Notosyodon; †Pampaphoneus; †Syodon

= Syodontinae =

Syodontinae Temporal range: Middle Permian (Roadian to Capitanian), 272–262 Ma

Extinct subfamily of mammal ancestors

Syodontinae is a group of dinocephalian therapsids. It is one of two subfamilies in the family Anteosauridae, the other being Anteosaurinae. They are known from the Middle Permian Period of what is now Russia and South Africa. One of the best known syodontines is Syodon from Russia. The South African form Australosyodon, is one of the earliest known Gondwanan anteosaurs.

== Description ==
Syodontines lack the boss on the lower jaw that characterises the related anteosaurines, and they have often been considered more primitive in this respect.

== Classification ==
Below is a cladogram showing syodontine relationships from a 2012 phylogenetic study of anteosaurians:

- Therapsida
  - Biarmosuchus tener
  - Dinocephalia
    - - Estemmenosuchus uralensis
      - - Ulemosaurus svijagensis
        - Tapinocaninus pamelae
    - Anteosauridae
      - Archaeosyodon praeventor
      - - Anteosaurinae
          - Sinophoneus yumenensis
          - - Titanophoneus adamanteus
            - - Titanophoneus potens
              - Anteosaurus magnificus
        - Syodontinae
          - Pampaphoneus biccai
          - - Notosyodon gusevi
            - - Syodon biarmicum
              - Australosyodon nyaphuli
