= Enobius =

Enobius Temporal range: Capitanian

Scientific classification
- Domain: Eukaryota
- Kingdom: Animalia
- Phylum: Chordata
- Clade: Synapsida
- Clade: Therapsida
- Suborder: †Dinocephalia
- Family: †Titanosuchidae
- Genus: †Enobius; Broom, 1923
- Species: †E. strubeni

Binomial name
- †Enobius strubeni Broom, 1923

Extinct genus of therapsids

Enobius is an extinct genus of dinocephalian therapsids. It is known from jaw fragments that can only be identified as titanosuchian.
