= Dinartamus =

Dinartamus Temporal range: Capitanian

Scientific classification
- Domain: Eukaryota
- Kingdom: Animalia
- Phylum: Chordata
- Clade: Synapsida
- Clade: Therapsida
- Suborder: †Dinocephalia
- Family: †Titanosuchidae
- Genus: †Dinartamus; Broom, 1923
- Species: †D. vanderbyli

Binomial name
- †Dinartamus vanderbyli Broom, 1923

Extinct genus of therapsids

Dinartamus is an extinct genus of titanosuchian therapsids.

This genus is only known through poor fossil records; therefore, there are few diagnostic characters known which are merely sufficient for classifying it as a titanosuchian.
