= Stepan Kutorga =

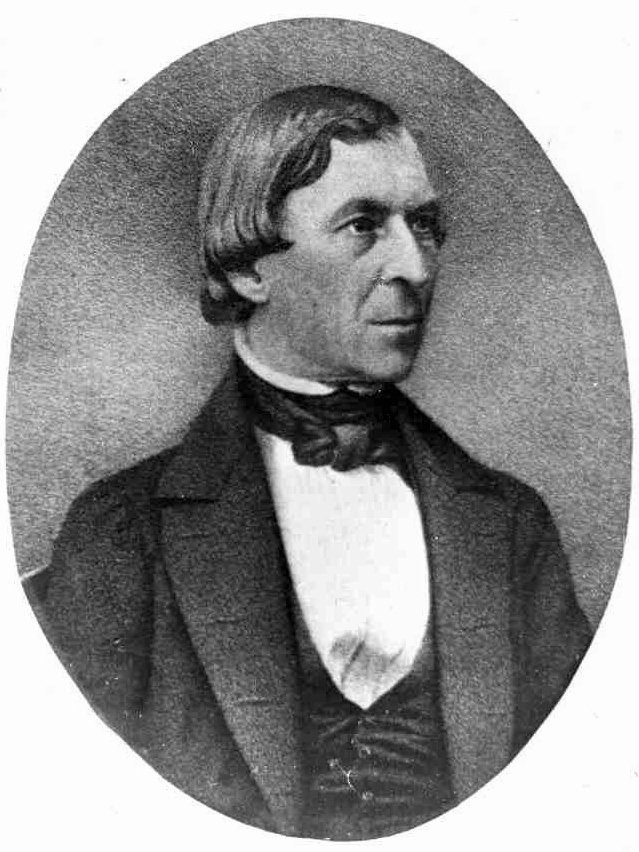

Stepan Semyonovich Kutorga (Russian: Степан Семёнович Куторга; 12 February 1805 – 25 April 1861) was a Russian naturalist, zoologist and mineralogist who worked as a professor at the Saint Petersburg Imperial University.

Kutorga was born in Mstislav, Mogilev Governorate, son of Semyon Martynovich Kutorga, and received his early education at home. He went to the Saint Petersburg Provincial Gymnasium and later to the Third Saint Petersburg Gymnasium. After graduating in 1827 he joined the Saint Petersburg University from where he was sent to the Imperial University of Dorpat. He studied medicine and received a doctor of medicine degree in 1832 with a dissertation "De organis vocis psittaci erytaci" ["the voice organs of the African grey parrot"]. In 1833 he obtained the chair of zoology at Saint Petersburg University, and from 1848 he also taught mineralogy. He published several works on anatomy and was a popularizer of natural history. In 1860 he was among the first Russians to favourably comment on Charles Darwin's ideas on evolution. In 1852 he helped produce a geological map of Saint Petersburg for which he received a Demidov Prize and a Konstantinovsky Medal. After his death, he was succeeded in his position at the university by his student Karl Kessler.
