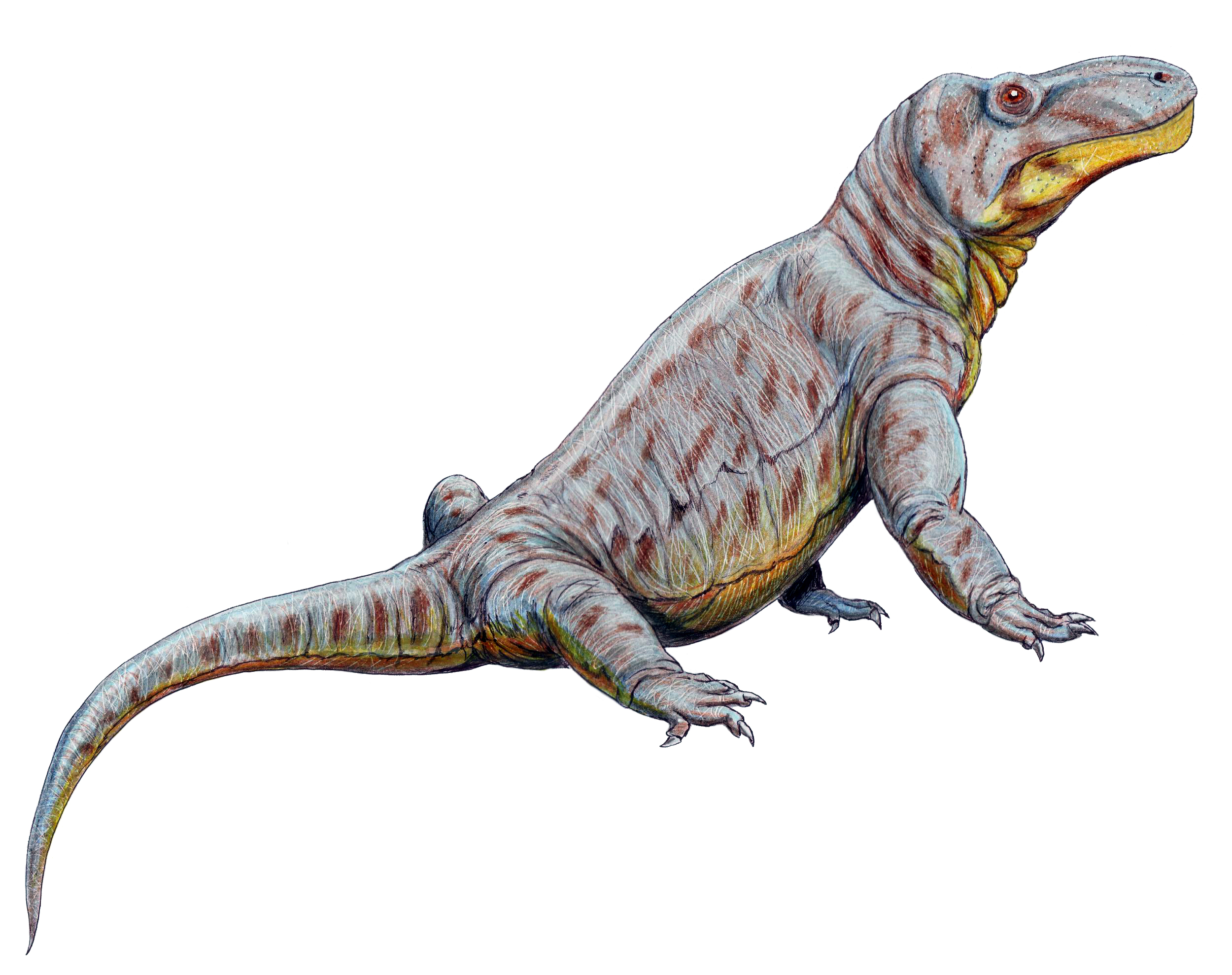

Scientific classification
- Kingdom: Animalia
- Phylum: Chordata
- Clade: Synapsida
- Clade: Therapsida
- Suborder: †Dinocephalia
- Family: †Titanosuchidae
- Genus: †Titanosuchus; Owen, 1876
- Species: †T. ferox

Binomial name
- †Titanosuchus ferox Owen, 1879

Synonyms
- Scapanodon Broom, 1904; Parascapanodon Boonstra, 1955

= Titanosuchus =

Titanosuchus Temporal range: Capitanian, 265 Ma

Extinct genus of therapsids

Titanosuchus ("titan crocodile") is an extinct genus of dinocephalian therapsids that lived in the Middle Permian epoch in South Africa. This genus has only one species, Titanosuchus ferox. Along with its close relatives, Jonkeria and Moschops, Titanosuchus inhabited present-day South Africa around 265 million years ago, in the Late Permian. Titanosuchus is frequently cited as being a carnivore; however, this is based on specimens now assigned to Anteosaurus. Instead, Titanosuchus was likely an omnivorous or herbivorous animal like the related Jonkeria. Titanosuchus is known from fragmentary jaw and postcranial material, which can be distinguished from Jonkeria by the greater length of the limb bones.

Parascapanodon and Scapanodon were once thought to be distinct genera, but are now considered to be junior synonyms of Titanosuchus.

== See also ==
- List of therapsids
