= Sea level drop =

Drop relative to land rebounding from weight of ice

Sea level drop refers to the phenomenon in which the shrinking weights of melting glaciers cause the surrounding land to rise and the relative sea level to fall.

== Background ==
In Höfn, Iceland, the sea level is dropping relative to the land at a rate of about 1.7 cm (0.7 in) per year, and nearby it is dropping 3.8 cm (1.5 in) per year. The effect in Iceland is mainly caused by the Vatnajökull glacier. If the land rises enough, the Hornafjörður fjord would become impassable from ships, which would significantly hurt the town. Other countries experience this effect as well; in a portion of Alaska and Canada, the relative sea level is falling by up to 2.0 cm (0.8 in) a year. In Norway, Sweden and Finland, an effect called Fennoscandian land elevation causes the relative sea level to fall by up to 0.7 cm (0.3 in) a year.

== See also ==
- Sea level rise
- Climate change in Iceland
- Post-glacial rebound
