= Supraorbital =

Supraorbital refers to the region immediately above the eye sockets, where in humans the eyebrows are located. It denotes several anatomical features, such as:

- Supraorbital artery
- Supraorbital foramen
- Supraorbital gland
- Supraorbital nerve
- Supraorbital ridge
- Supraorbital vein
