= Botrychiopsis =

Botrychiopsis Temporal range: 359.2–251 Ma

Scientific classification
- Kingdom: Plantae
- Division: Pteridophyta
- Genus: Botrychiopsis

Species
- B. ovata; B. plantianum; B. ovata; B. weissiana

Extinct genus of plants

Botrychiopsis is an extinct genus that existed from the Carboniferous to the Permian. Vascularized seedless plants (ferns) and reproduction by spores. They leaf type fronds. They lived in locals humid and swampy.

== Location ==
In Brazil of the fossil species B. plantianum was located in outcrop Morro Papalé in the city of Mariana Pimentel. The species B. validate was located in outcrop Quitéria in Pantano Grande. They are in the geopark Paleorrota in Rio Bonito Formation and date from Sakmarian in Permian.
