= Climate change in Iceland =

Climate change affects various environments and industries in Iceland.

== Greenhouse gas emissions ==
Greenhouse gas emissions in community amounted to 2,700,000 tonnes of carbon dioxide equivalent. Heavy industry accounts for 40% of the greenhouse gas emissions of Iceland.

== Impact ==
The invasive species Lupinus nootkatensis has grown considerably in Iceland, partly as an instrument for converting barren landscapes to reforestation.

== Response ==
In 2024, the government of Iceland started construction on a wind farm.

In late 2025, Iceland's National Security Council elevated the potential collapse of the Atlantic Meridional Overturning Circulation (AMOC) to a national security risk. The government recognized severe climate impacts such as extreme European winters, food and energy insecurity, and economic disruption as major existential threats to the country.

=== Legislation ===
==== Climate Act ====
Lög um loftslagsmál 2012 nr. 70 29. júní

Althing
- Enacted: 2012-06-29
- Status: In force

In 2012, the Icelandic Parliament passed legislation that would require the publication of climate mitigation plans, climate adaptation plans, and the establishment of a board to oversee the implementation of these plans.

Under the legislation, in 2024, the Environment Agency fined the Nomadic Aviation Group for not submitting emissions allowances in 2022.
