= Notosyodon =

Notosyodon Temporal range: Middle Permian

Scientific classification
- Kingdom: Animalia
- Phylum: Chordata
- Clade: Synapsida
- Clade: Therapsida
- Suborder: †Dinocephalia
- Family: †Anteosauridae
- Genus: †Notosyodon; Tchudinov, 1968
- Species: †N. gusevi

Binomial name
- †Notosyodon gusevi Tchudinov, 1968

Extinct genus of therapsids

Notosyodon is an extinct genus of non-mammalian therapsids. The holotype PIN 2505/1, consists of a partial skull preserving the orbital, occipital, and basicranial regions. Other remains include PIN 2505/2, a right lower incisor, and PIN 2505/3, a left upper postcanine, found associated with the holotype and PIN 2608/1, the anterior half of a left dentary found on the right bank of the Donguz River, near Dolmatovskii Farm, Sol-Iletsk District, Orenburg Region, Russia.

== See also ==
- List of therapsids
