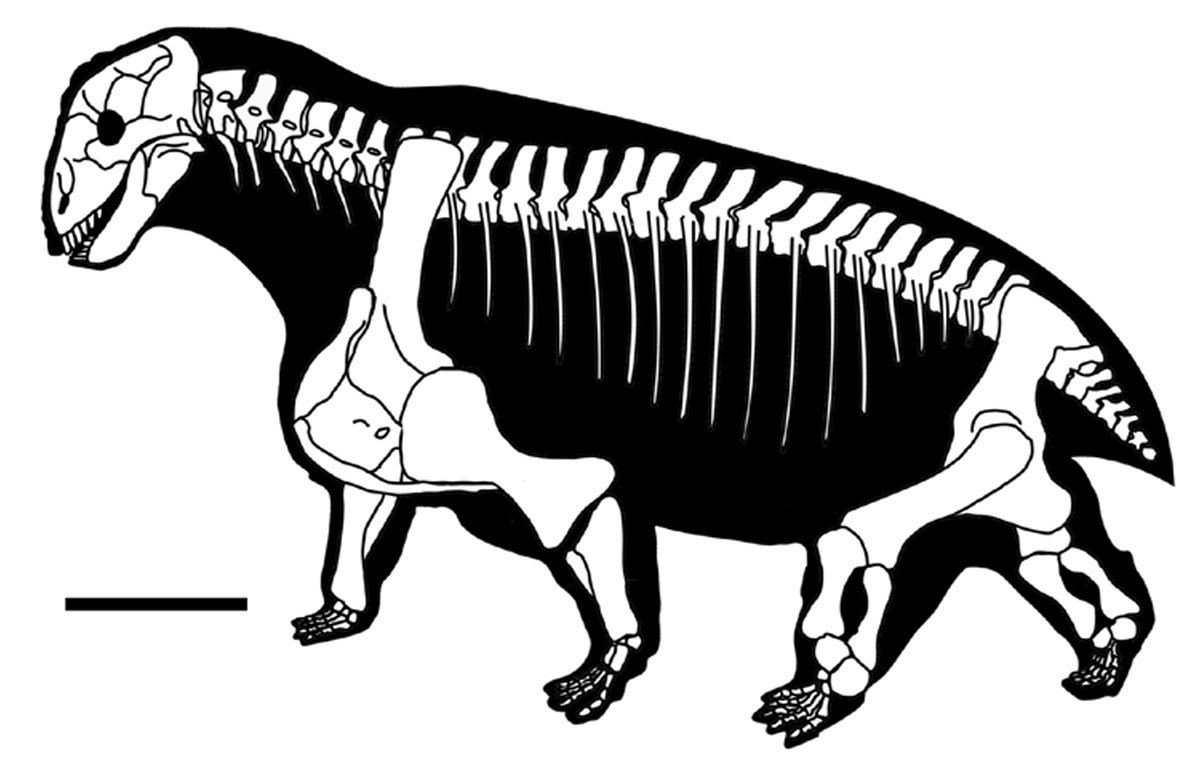
- Skeletal digram

Scientific classification
- Kingdom: Animalia
- Phylum: Chordata
- Clade: Synapsida
- Clade: Therapsida
- Suborder: †Dinocephalia
- Family: †Tapinocephalidae
- Subfamily: †Tapinocanininae
- Genus: †Tapinocaninus; Rubidge, 1991
- Species: †T. pamelae

Binomial name
- †Tapinocaninus pamelae Rubidge, 1991

= Tapinocaninus =

Tapinocaninus Temporal range: Wordian

Extinct genus of therapsids

Tapinocaninus (Greek for "humble"- tapino, and "canine"- caninus) is an extinct genus of therapsids in the family Tapinocephalidae, of which it is the most basal member. Only one species is known, Tapinocaninus pamelae (meaning "Pamela's humble canine"). The species is named in honor of Rubidge's mother, Pamela. Fossils have been found dating from the Middle Permian (Wordian age).

== Discovery ==
Tapinocaninus fossils were first found in the Eodicynodon Assemblage Zone of the Karoo deposits, in the Lower Beaufort Beds in Beaufort West. Five specimens are known, four found at Modderdrift farm and one found on Swartgrond farm. A holotype (NMQR 2987) and four paratypes (NMQR 2985, 2986, 3097 and ROZ K95).

Two specimens were found by the director of the Bernard Price Institute for Paleontological Research (now the Evolutionary Studies Institute), Professor Bruce Rubidge. Three were found by John Nyaphuli of the National Museum Bloemfontein in the same sandstone. The excavation and preparation of NMQR 2986 the holotype NMQR 2987 was a large undertaking due to the large size of the specimens, and this process took place from 1985 to 2005. Air scribe machinery was used to prepare the specimens, along with manual tools such as a hammer and chisel in areas where matrix was more abundant.

Prior to the discovery of the Tapinocaninus, the Anteosaurinae were believed to be the most primitive dinocephalians, and the Tapinocephalinae were believed to be the most derived dinocephalians of South Africa. When comparing features of Tapinocaninus to those discussed of Tapinocephalinae through a cladistic analysis, Rubidge et al. (1991) found that a synapomorphy of the two were the expanded heels on the incisor teeth. Thus, after its discovery, Tapinocaninus is considered the most primitive tapinocephaline.

== Description ==
This species is known from several skulls, as most specimens found were lacking of the post cranial skeleton. It was a large animal, measuring 2.5m in length from snout to ilium. With classic regression formulas using the circumference of the humerus and femur bones, researchers approximated that they averaged a body mass of 892 kilograms (1,967 lb) for the taxon. Tapinocaninus were also the largest therapsids from the Guadalupian.

=== Skull ===
The skull roof and postorbital bar of Tapinocaninus shows pachyostotic thickening, which is consistent with other tapinocephaline dinocephalians. The skull roof is majorly composed of the frontal, which extends between the orbital and temporal fenestre. The external naris is bordered dorsally, anteriorly, and anteroventrally by the premaxilla bone. The maxilla forms a majority of the lateral area of the face, and it is swollen to allow room for the root of the canine tooth. The temporal openings are relatively large, and subsequently, Tapinocaninus has a narrow intertemporal region, which is considered a primitive feature of Tapinocephalinae. The temporal fenestra are bordered ventrally and posteriorly by the squamosal, and dorsally by the postorbital. The squamosal and postorbital touch along the temporal opening, which is a feature commonly found in tapinocephalids. Additionally, these taxon have a thin snout, sloping occipital, relatively small quadratojugal, prominent stapedial foramen, and relatively anterior position of the quadrate.

=== Palate ===
The palate of Tapinocaninus has narrow vomers with a crest between them that surrounds the internal nares. The premaxilla that overlies the maxilla anteriorly and ventrally, and the maxilla contacts both the palatine and pterygoid medially. Over half the length of the palate is the pterygoid, and it has lateral flanges that extend ventrally and transversally. Additionally, the pterygoid touches the basisphenoid behind the interpterygoid vacuity.

=== Vertebrae ===
The vertebrae of Tapinocaninus are distinguished by their laterally facing fovea at the base of the neural spine. This feature is primitive for therapsids, another ancestral trait for this clade also includes the presence of intercentra in between the cervical vertebrae. Tapinocaninus have 36 vertebrae, 8 cervicals, 20 dorsals, 5 lumbars, 2 sacrals and 7 caudals. They have a long neural spine that extends all the way to the caudal vertebrae. Their vertebral structure suggests that tapinocaninus had very short tails similar to anomodonts, but in contrast to anteosaurids. The presence of only two sacral vertebrae in Tapinocaninus differs from other therapsids, such as Moschops which has three.

=== Ribs ===
There are ribs present along the entire vertebral column. In the cervical region, the ribs are shortened and flat. The longest ribs are present in the mid-dorsal region, and dorsal ribs 11-15 are barrel shaped to accommodate the large digestive system of Tapinocaninus. In the caudal region, the ribs are again shortened, in addition to being dorsoventrally flattened, posteriorly directed, and not fused to the caudal vertebrae

=== Pectoral girdle ===
The pectoral girdle of Tapinocaninus has a prominent scapula, with an enlarged dorsal end. The glenoid is straight, ventral facing, and thickened to comprise the coracoids and scapula. A ridge runs diagonally from the posterior dorsal end of the glenoid to the anterior end of the scapula, and this limits the movement of the clavicle over the scapula. The scapula also flares to connect with the anterior coracoid, which is a round, large bone.

=== Pelvic girdle ===
The pelvic girdle of the holotype NMQR 2987 is partially preserved, and the other specimens are also lacking of a complete structure. However, parallel grooves are found on the surface of the ischium, which suggest that they may have been connected by tissue.

=== Humerus ===
Three humeri were retained from various specimens of Tapinocaninus, although the right humerus of the holotype is the most complete, and well described in research. The bone has a narrow center and widens at the ends, with the proximal end larger than the distal. The deltopectoral crest flares and makes up a large portion of the length of the bone. The distal end of the humerus has a small entepicondyle and a larger ectepicondyle with fossa separating the two. Tapinocaninus differs from Ulemosaurus and Moschops in that it has an entepicondylar foramen while the latter two taxon have ectepicondylar and entepicondylar foramen.

=== Femur ===
The holotype NMQR 2987 has both the left and right femora present. This specimen shows that the femur is more slender than the humerus. The femur is the same width at the proximal and distal ends, and it is flattened anteroposteriorly. Similar to other tapinocephalids, Tapinocaninus has a medially inflected femoral head. At the distal end of the femur, there are lateral and medial condyles, and the lateral condyle is slightly larger in size.

=== Dentition ===
Although there is currently no specimen with perfectly preserved teeth, the dental description for Tapinocaninus has been drawn from various skulls (NMQR 2984, NMQR 2986, NMQR 2987, ROZ K95).This dinocephalian has a heterodont dentition, consisting of incisors, canines and post canines. There are a maximum of five incisor teeth present in the premaxilla, all of which display talon and heel morphology. A singular canine is the first tooth in the maxilla bone, it is curved backward, and does not have a heel. Following the canine is the post canine teeth, characterized by pointed crowns and small, lingually situated heels. The dentition indicates that these animals were likely an herbivore or omnivore.

== Paleobiology ==
=== Posture and locomotion ===
Researchers suggest the forelimb posture of Tapinocaninus to be “intermediate” between sprawling and an upright posture. It is suggested that they are more upright standing than sphenacodonts, but more sprawled than theriodont therapsids. Their intermediate posture can be explained by their long bones, in addition to the shape and positioning of the humerus and medially inflected femur. This postural stance would also be more supportive of the Tapinocaninus’ larger body size. Additionally, the presence of intercentra only in the anterior dorsal vertebrae and medially directed zygapophyses in Tapinocaninus suggests that they had less undulatory locomotion in when compared to sphenacodonts.

=== Feeding ===
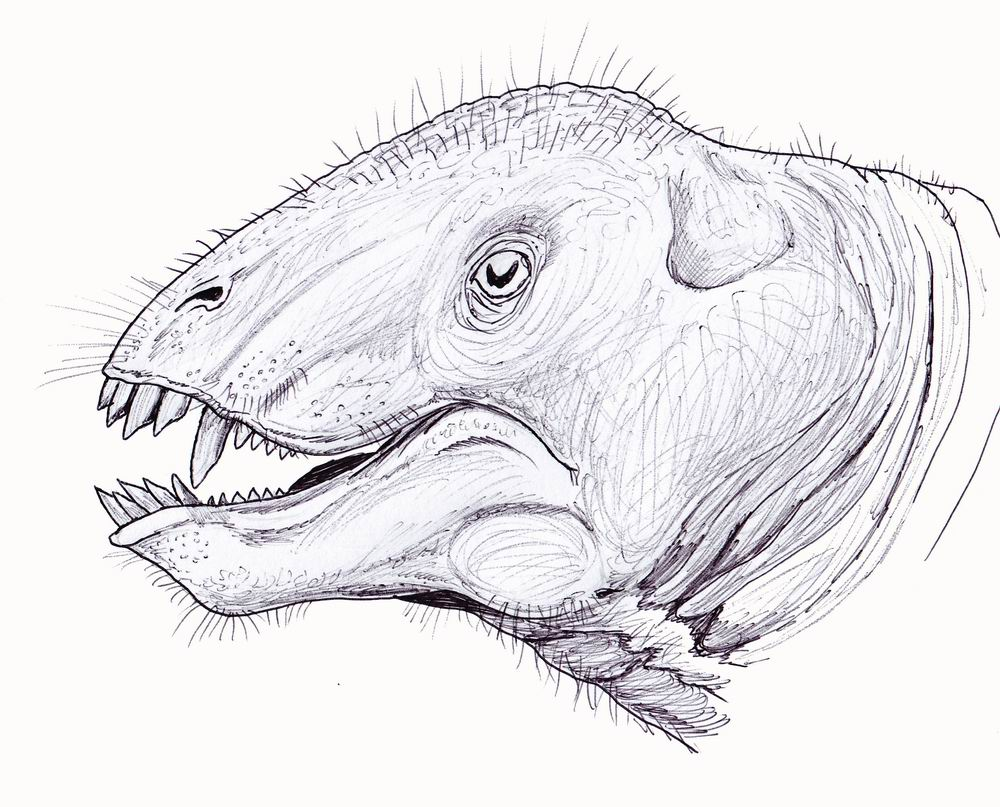
Life restoration of the head, showing the differentiated teeth

Heterodont dentition indicates that the teeth are morphologically differentiated by shape. In Tapinocaninus, this includes incisors, canines, and postcanines, all of which have different shapes which allows for a variety of functions. Tapinocaninus was likely an herbivore or an omnivore.

== Geological and biostratigraphic information ==
The Eodicynodon Assemblage Zone is in the southwestern part of the Karoo Basin, and it is the lowest biozone of the Beaufort Group, under the Eosimops-Glanosuchus Subzone of the Tapinocephalus Assemblage Zone. The lower boundary lies at a stratigraphic horizon between the Ecca Group (Waterford Formation) and the Beaufort Group (Abrahamskraal Formation), which researchers Rubidge and Oelofsen considered to be a paleoshoreline. It was named by Rubudge in 1995 after the most common therapsid present in the area, the Eodicynodon oosthuizeni. The lower boundary is set by the first appearance of Eodicynodon oosthuizeni in the zone, and the upper boundary by the first appearance of Eosimops newtoni, a dicynodont. Laterally, the biozone runs from Laingsburg to the south of Rietbron.

The zone is identified by the existence of Eodicynodon oosthuizeni, a dicynodont, along with Tapinocaninus pamelae and Australosyodon nyaphulii, two types of dinocephalians. Tapinocaninus fossils account for approximately 10% of all tetrapod fossils found in this biozone. The thickness of this biozone ranges from 320 to 1100m, with the maximum thickness occurring at the Prince Albert Road station, and gradually thinning to the east and west of this point. The biozone is made up of siltstones, sandstones, and mudstones. Fossils of tetrapods are rare in this area, however, there are copious impressions of equisetalian and Glossopteris stems and leaves on the mudrock surfaces. When found, therapsid fossils are typically well preserved in the mud rock strata, and dinocephalians found in fine-grained sandstone.
