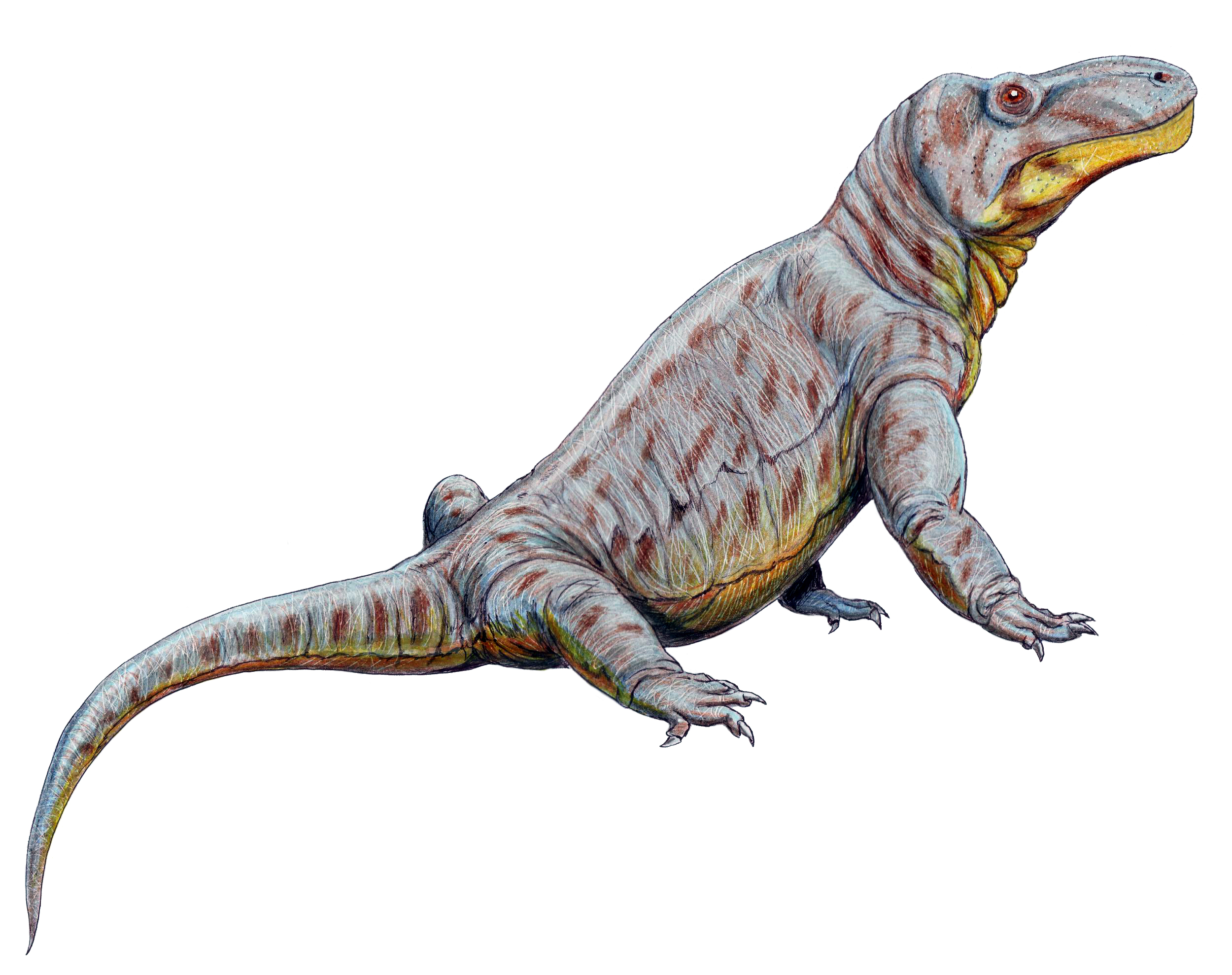
- Life restoration of Titanosuchus ferox
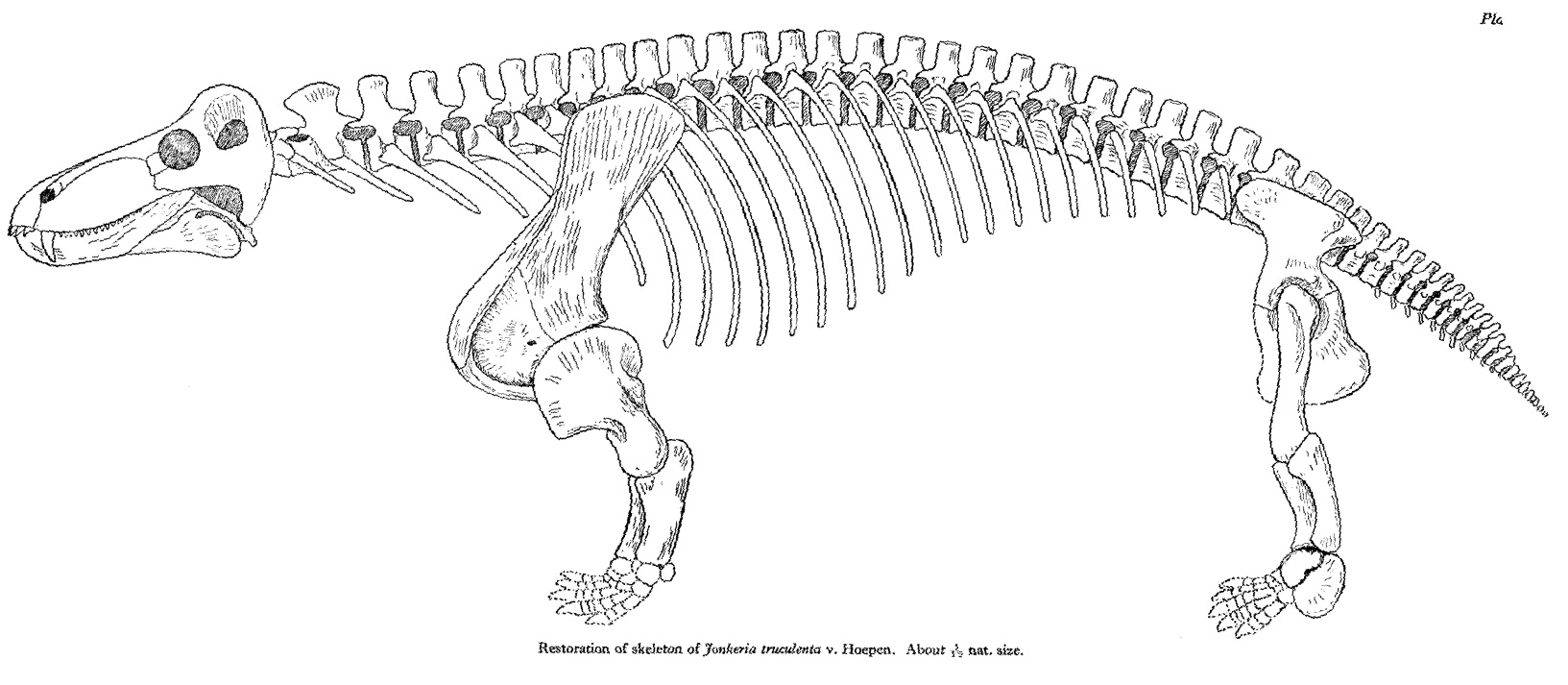
- Skeleton of Jonkeria

Scientific classification
- Kingdom: Animalia
- Phylum: Chordata
- Clade: Synapsida
- Clade: Therapsida
- Suborder: †Dinocephalia
- Clade: †Titanosuchia; Broom
- Family: †Titanosuchidae; Broom, 1903

Genera
- †Jonkeria; †Titanosuchus

= Titanosuchidae =

Titanosuchidae Temporal range: Middle Permian, 270–260 Ma

Extinct family of therapsids

Titanosuchidae is an extinct family of dinocephalians known only from the middle Permian Tapinocephalus Assemblage Zone of South Africa.

The titanosuchids were large, omnivorous or herbivorous animals. As with other tapinocephalians, they had thickened skulls that may have been used in head-butting, but to a lesser degree than in Tapinocephalidae or Anteosauridae. They had large canine teeth, strong incisors with a "talon and heel" morphology, and leaf-shaped postcanine teeth. Two titanosuchid genera are recognized as valid: Jonkeria and Titanosuchus; they can be distinguished on the basis of limb proportions.
