= Dinocephalia (disambiguation) =

Dinocephalia may refer to:

- Dinocephalia, a synapsid suborder from the Permian
- Dinocephalia (beetle), a beetle genus
