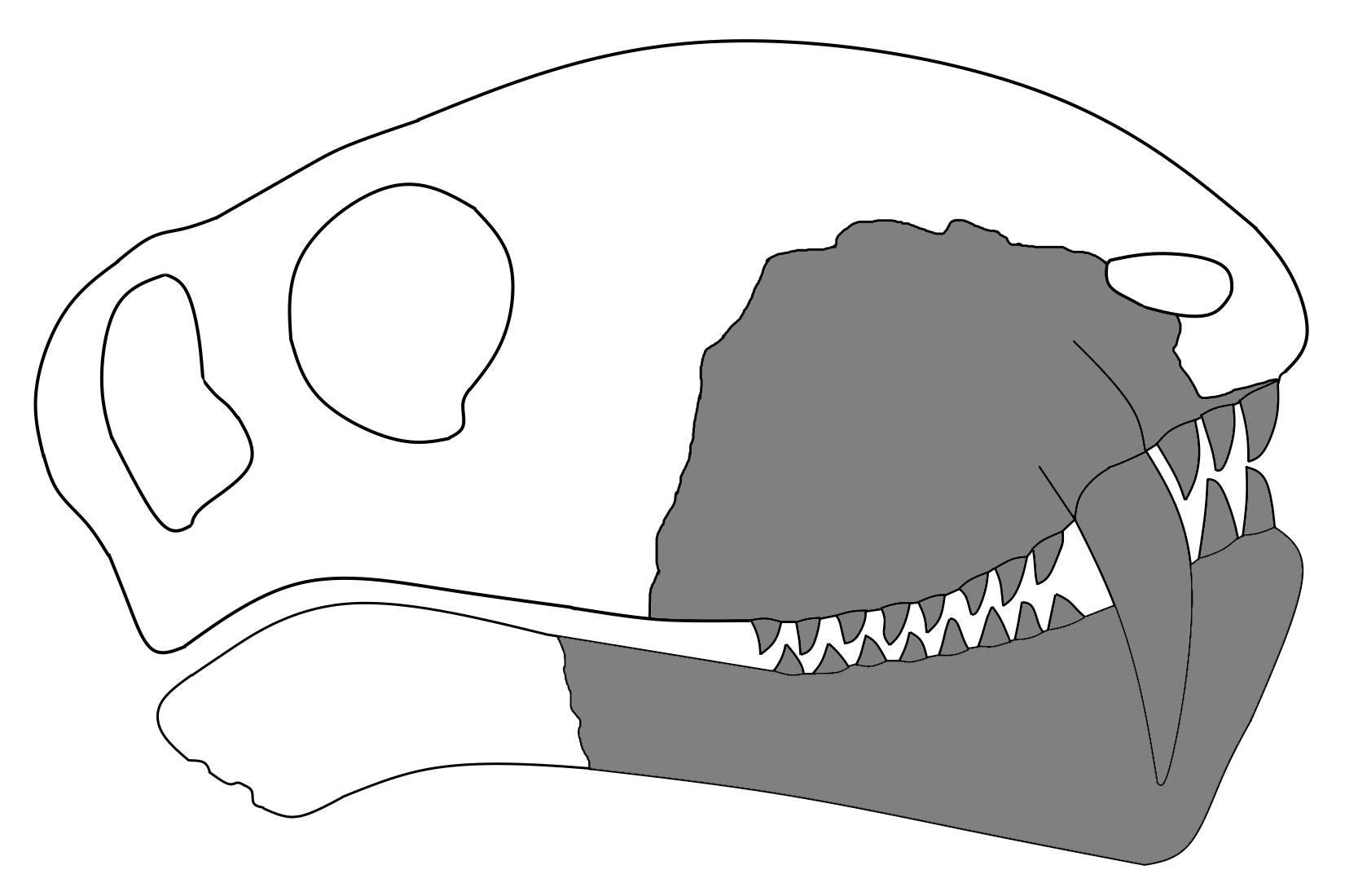
- Cranial reconstruction of the holotype specimen, with the shaded areas indicating the known fossil material.

Scientific classification
- Kingdom: Animalia
- Phylum: Chordata
- Clade: Synapsida
- Clade: Therapsida
- Genus: †Dinosaurus; Fischer, 1847
- Species: †D. murchisonii

Binomial name
- †Dinosaurus murchisonii (Fischer, 1845)

Synonyms
- Rhopalodon murchisonii Fischer, 1845

= Dinosaurus =

Dinosaurus Temporal range: ~Middle Permian

Extinct genus of therapsids

Dinosaurus is an extinct genus of enigmatic therapsids that lived during the Middle Permian in what is now Russia. Initially described as a species of the related genus Rhopalodon by Gotthelf Fischer von Waldheim in 1845, the taxon was assigned its own genus by the same author two years later under the new combination D. murchisonii. The only known specimen consists of cranial remains belonging to a single individual discovered in a copper mine of the former Orenburg Governorate, west of the Ural Mountains. The animal's generic name refers to the supposedly "wild and voracious" nature, while the specific name honours the Scottish geologist Roderick Murchison. Despite its name, Dinosaurus is not a dinosaur; like Dimetrodon, it belongs to the clade Synapsida and is therefore more closely related to mammals than to dinosaurs, the latter being sauropsids.

== History of study ==
The holotype and only known specimen of Dinosaurus was discovered in the early 1840s in the Klyuchevskiy-1 copper mine, located in the Belebeyevsky District within the Orenburg Governorate of the Russian Empire, on the western slopes of the Ural Mountains. This locality was initially dated to the Late Permian, before later being reassigned to the Middle Permian. The specimen originally consisted of a portion of the mandible associated with the left side of the upper jaw, both belonging to the anterior region of the skull. Two years after the initial discovery, the right side of the upper jaw was also uncovered. Together, the remains preserve the cheek teeth as well as the upper canines, whereas the lower canines are not visible due to the state of preservation of the mandible. Following their collection, the Russian geologist Wagenheim von Qualen, who was also director of the mine where the discoveries were made, donated the fossils to the collection of Maximilian de Beuharnais, Duke of Leuchtenberg. The original specimens are now considered lost. However, casts are preserved at the Paleontological Institute of the Russian Academy of Sciences in Moscow under the catalogue numbers PIN 296/1 & 2.

The discovery was initially announced by von Qualen in a letter addressed to the Russian paleontologist Gotthelf Fischer von Waldheim, in which he noted that the rock matrix containing the first portion of the upper jaw also preserved a fossil frond probably attributable to the fern Pecopteris. (Note: In a 1899 study, the German paleontologist Georg Baur and his American colleague Ermine Cowles Case asserted that von Qualen had misidentified the first Dinosaurus fossils in his letter, interpreting them as remains belonging to the Pecopteris-like plant. However, von Qualen's text clearly distinguishes the cranial material from this fossil plant.) Later that same year, Fischer described the first remains and assigned them to a new species of the genus Rhopalodon (which he had erected in 1841 with the type species R. wangenheimi), naming it R. murchisonii in honour of the Scottish geologist Roderick Murchison for his numerous contributions to the study of Permian deposits. Two years later, Fischer described a third fossil which he considered to belong to the same species, but sufficiently distinct to justify the erection of a new genus. As the animal was regarded as "wild and voracious", he established the genus Dinosaurus. In 1848, the German naturalist Karl Eduard von Eichwald demonstrated that the fragments previously described by Fischer actually belonged to a single skull. Nevertheless, he reassigned the species to Rhopalodon, considering that the observed differences were not yet sufficient to justify a separate genus. Eichwald also pointed out that the name Dinosaurus was very similar to Dinosauria, a reptile taxon created a few years earlier by the British palaeontologist Richard Owen in 1842, and therefore regarded the generic name as potentially preoccupied. However, such a similarity between two scientific names does not in itself constitute a valid reason for nomenclatural invalidation.

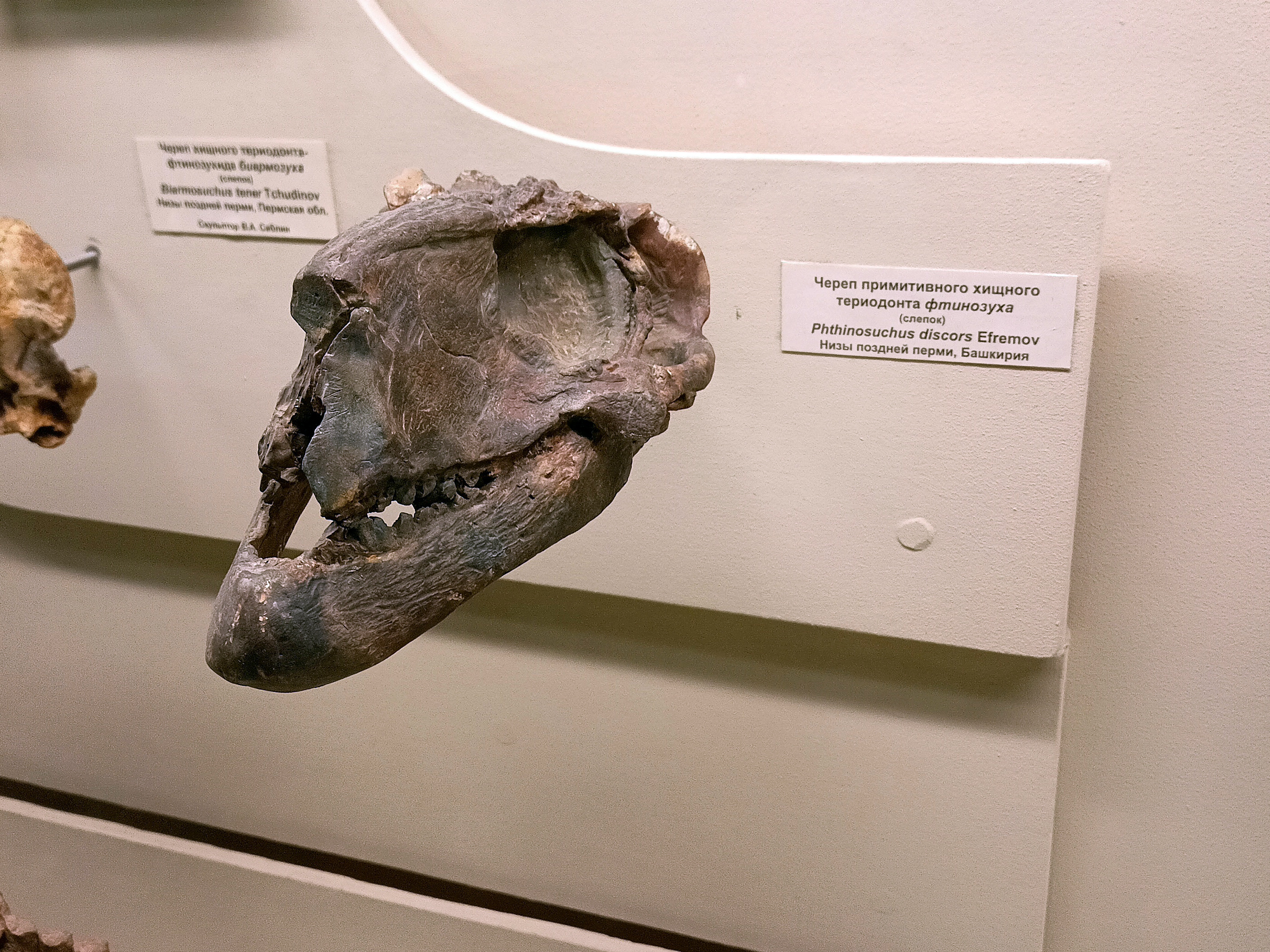
Holotype skull of Phthinosuchus discors, a taxon once regarded as a junior synonym of Dinosaurus.

Due to the discovery of numerous therapsid fossils in the Klyuchevskiy-1 mine, the validity of Dinosaurus was questioned by several authors over the following decades. In 1894, the British paleontologist Harry Govier Seeley notably suggested that Cliorhizodon (now regarded as a junior synonym of the anteosaurid Syodon) could not be distinguished from Dinosaurus. In 1954, the Russian paleontologist Ivan Yefremov in turn proposed that Dinosaurus and Rhopalodon should be regarded as junior synonyms of Brithopus. Although this interpretation was later followed by some authors, it was rejected by others, who pointed out that Brithopus is based solely on a partial and non-diagnostic humerus, rendering the taxon a nomen dubium. In the absence of directly comparable or associated fossil material with the remains assigned to Dinosaurus, they considered this synonymy impossible to demonstrate reliably. In 2000, the Russian palaeontologist Mikhail F. Ivakhnenko synonymised Phthinosuchus discors with Dinosaurus, arguing that the much more complete holotype skull of the former anatomically corresponded to the cranial fragments known for the latter. (Note: Long before being designated as the holotype of Phthinosuchus by Yefremov in 1954, this skull had already been described nearly sixty years earlier by Seeley as belonging to Rhopalodon.) However, in 2011, the American paleontologist Christian F. Kammerer noted that the very limited anatomical data available for Dinosaurus make any definitive confirmation of this proposed synonymy difficult.

== See also ==
- Gresslyosaurus – Originally was to be called "Dinosaurus"
