= 1838 in paleontology =

Paleontology or palaeontology is the study of prehistoric life forms on Earth through the examination of plant and animal fossils. This includes the study of body fossils, tracks (ichnites), burrows, cast-off parts, fossilised feces (coprolites), palynomorphs and chemical residues. Because humans have encountered fossils for millennia, paleontology has a long history both before and after becoming formalized as a science. This article records significant discoveries and events related to paleontology that occurred or were published in the year 1838.

== Plesiosaurs ==
=== New taxa ===
Name	Status	Authors	Notes	Images
Charitosaurus	Valid	Meyer		
Ischyrodon	Valid	von Meyer		

== Synapsids ==
=== Non-mammalian ===
Name	Status	Authors	Age	Unit	Location	Notes	Images
Brithopus	Nomen dubium	Kutorga	Late Permian		Russia	A member of Dinocephalia.	
Orthopus	Nomen dubium	Kutorga	Late Permian		Russia	A member of Dinocephalia.	
Syodon	Valid	Kutorga	Middle Permian		Russia	A member of Dinocephalia.	

== Fish ==
=== Sharks ===
Name	Status	Authors	Age	Unit	Location	Notes	Images
Carcharodon subauriculatus	Nomen dubium	Agassiz, 1838	Early Miocene		United States, Calvert Formation	A chimeric shark, junior synonym of Otodus chubutensis and O. megalodon.	
Carcharodon plicatilis	Valid	Agassiz	Late Miocene-Early Pliocene		Australia, North America, South America, Europe and Portugal.	Possible synonym of Carcharodon hastalis.	
Carcharodon hastalis	Valid	Agassiz	Early Oligocene-Late Pleistocene		Cosmopolitan.	An extinct shark.	
