= Phthinosaurus =

Phthinosaurus Temporal range: Middle Permian

Scientific classification
- Domain: Eukaryota
- Kingdom: Animalia
- Phylum: Chordata
- Clade: Synapsida
- Clade: Therapsida
- Suborder: †Dinocephalia (?)
- Family: †Rhopalodontidae (?)
- Genus: †Phthinosaurus; Yefremov, 1940

Type species
- †Phthinosaurus borrisiaki Yefremov, 1940

Extinct genus of therapsids

Phthinosaurus is an extinct genus of therapsids from the Middle Permian of Russia. The type species Phthinosaurus borrisiaki was named by Soviet paleontologist Ivan Yefremov in 1940 on the basis of an isolated lower jaw. Because this jaw provides few distinguishing characteristics, the evolutionary relationships of Phthinosaurus are poorly known. Yefremov named the family Phthinosuchidae in 1954 to include Phthinosaurus and the newly named Phthinosuchus, which was described on the basis of a crushed partial skull. American paleontologist Everett C. Olson placed both of these therapsids in the larger infraorder Phthinosuchia in 1961. In 1974 Leonid Tatarinov named the family Phthinosauridae to include Phthinosaurus alone, retaining Phthinosuchus within Phthinosuchidae.

Phthinosaurus differs from Phthinosuchus in that it has a small coronoid process near where the lower jaw would attach to the rest of the skull. Tatarinov classified Phthinosaurus as a therocephalian in 1998, as therocephalians are known to have prominent coronoid processes. In 2008, the Russian paleontologist M. F. Ivakhnenko noted that the tooth sockets angle slightly backward rather than directly upward as in Phthinosuchus, and that the lower margin of the jaw is slightly convex. Both of these features were used as evidence for reclassifying Phthinosaurus as a rhopalodontid dinocephalian.
