= Mnemeiosaurus =

Mnemeiosaurus Temporal range: Middle Permian

Scientific classification
- Domain: Eukaryota
- Kingdom: Animalia
- Phylum: Chordata
- Clade: Synapsida
- Clade: Therapsida
- Suborder: †Dinocephalia
- Family: †Brithopodidae
- Genus: †Mnemeiosaurus; Nopcsa, 1928
- Species: †M. jubilaei

Binomial name
- †Mnemeiosaurus jubilaei Nopcsa, 1928

Extinct genus of therapsids

Mnemeiosaurus jubilaei or Deuterosaurus jubilaei is an extinct species of dinocephalian therapsids. It was originally named as representing a distinct genus, Mnemeiosaurus ("remembrance lizard"), by Franz Nopcsa in 1928, which some authors, such as Boonstra and Tchudinov, have agreed with, whereas some authors, such as Efremov and Ivakhnenko, regard it as a species of Deuterosaurus. Two skulls, the holotype PIN 1954/2 and a referred specimen, PIN 2629/1, are known.

== Taxonomic history ==
The skull that would become the type specimen of Mnemeiosaurus jubilaei was described by Harry Govier Seeley in 1894 as a specimen of Deuterosaurus. In 1925, during the 200 years jubilee of the Russian Academy of Science, Franz Nopcsa re-examined the skull and concluded that it represented a distinct taxon, which in 1928 he named Mnemeiosaurus jubilaei, the genus name being derived from Greek μνημεῖον "token, remembrance" in reference to the festivities during which he studied the specimen. He considered M. jubilaei to be a tapinocephalian. Nopcsa considered a skull fragment, consisting only of the palate, that Seeley had included in Deuterosaurus to represent yet another distinct taxon, which he named Uraniskosaurus watsoni, from Greek οὐρανίσκος "palate" and in honor of M. D. S. Watson. He considered it to have gorgonopsian affinities. However, in 1954, Ivan Efremov concluded that both Mnemeiosaurus and Uraniscosaurus were based on the same skull. He considered both names to be synonyms of Deuterosaurus. In 1965, Lieuwe Dirk Boonstra considered Efremov's interpretation to be erroneous and regarded Deuterosaurus as an anteosaur, while, like Nopcsa, he considered Mnemeiosaurus to be a tapinocephalian. In 1983, Tchudinov also retained Mnemeiosaurus and Deuterosaurus as distinct taxa. He classified Mnemeiosaurus as a "brithopodid", whereas he classified Deuterosaurus in its own family, Deuterosauridae.

== See also ==
- List of therapsids
