= Chthomaloporus =

Chthomaloporus Temporal range: Middle Permian

Scientific classification
- Domain: Eukaryota
- Kingdom: Animalia
- Phylum: Chordata
- Clade: Synapsida
- Clade: Therapsida
- Suborder: †Dinocephalia
- Family: †Brithopodidae
- Genus: †Chthomaloporus; Chudinov, 1964

Extinct genus of therapsids

Chthomaloporus is an extinct genus of Anteosaurian therapsids.

== See also ==
- List of therapsids
