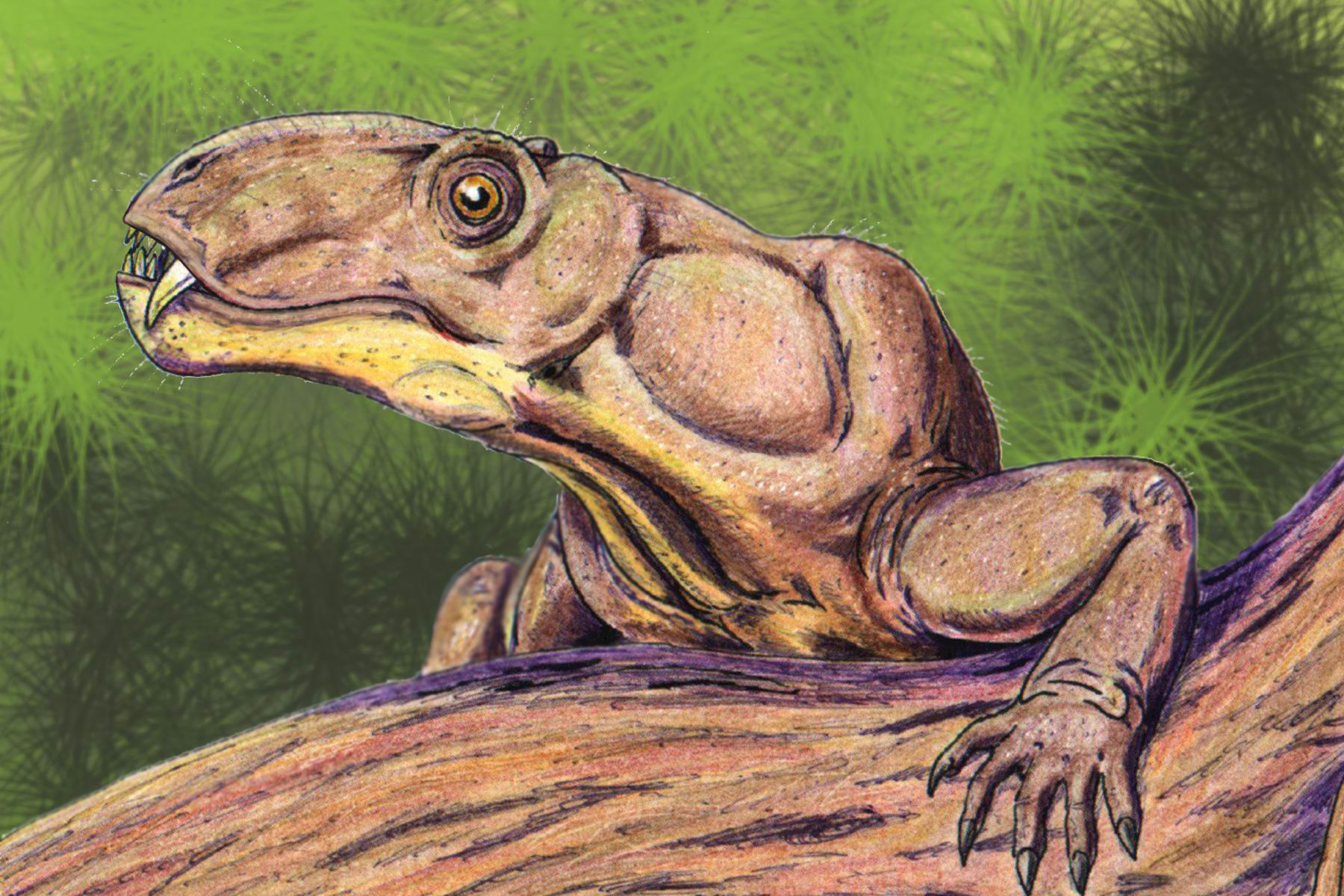
- Life restoration of Phthinosuchus discors

Scientific classification
- Kingdom: Animalia
- Phylum: Chordata
- Clade: Synapsida
- Clade: Therapsida
- Suborder: †Dinocephalia (?)
- Clade: †Anteosauria (?)
- Infraorder: †Phthinosuchia; Romer, 1961

Subgroups
- See text.

= Phthinosuchia =

Phthinosuchia Temporal range: Middle Permian, 270 Ma

Extinct infraorder of mammals

Phthinosuchia is an extinct group of therapsids including two poorly known species, Phthinosuchus discors and Phthinosaurus borrisiaki, from the Middle Permian of Russia. Phthinthosuchus is known a partial crushed skull and Phthinosaurus is known from an isolated lower jaw. The two species have traditionally been grouped together based on their shared primitive characteristics, but more recent studies have proposed that they are more distantly related. Phthinosuchus is either a carnivorous gorgonopsian relative or an anteosaurian dinocephalian while Phthinosaurus is either a herbivorous rhopalodont dinocephalian or a therocephalian.

Phthinosuchia was named by American paleontologist Everett C. Olson in 1961, who considered it the most primitive infraorder within Therapsida. A year later Olson named the new infraorder Eotheriodontia and reclassified Phthinosuchia as a subgroup of eotheriodonts, along with the families Biarmosuchidae and Brithopodidae. Each species has been placed in its own family; Phthinosuchidae was named by Soviet paleontologist Ivan Yefremov in 1954 for both Phthinthosuchus and Phthinosaurus, while Phthinosauridae was named by Leonid Tatarinov in 1974 for Phthinosaurus alone.
