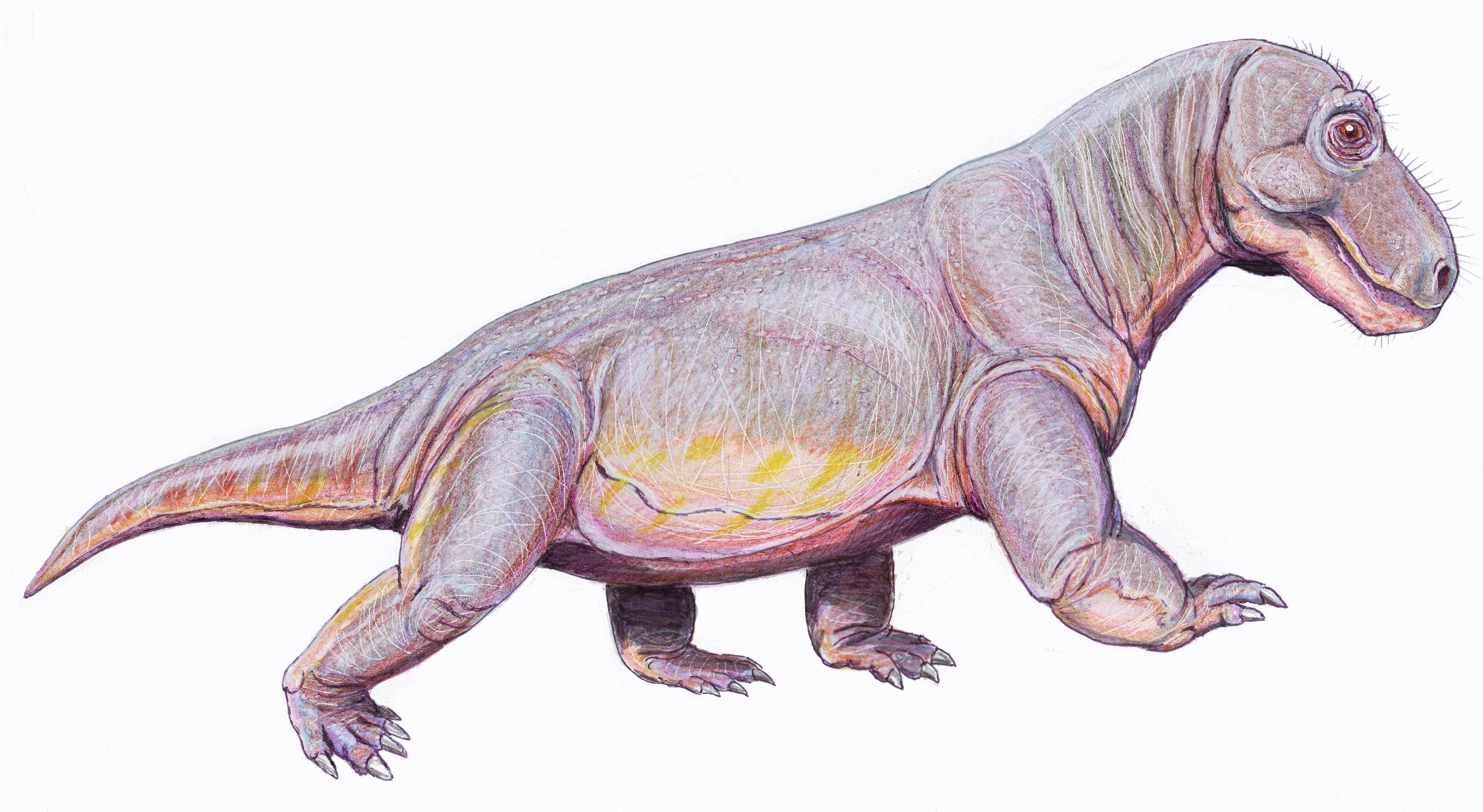
- Speculative reconstruction of Rhopalodontidae, based mostly on Parabradysaurus.

Scientific classification
- Kingdom: Animalia
- Phylum: Chordata
- Clade: Synapsida
- Clade: Therapsida
- Suborder: †Dinocephalia
- Family: †Rhopalodontidae

Genera
- Parabradysaurus; Rhopalodon; ?Phthinosaurus

= Rhopalodontidae =

Rhopalodontidae Temporal range: middle Permian

Extinct family of therapsids

Rhopalodontidae is a family of tapinocephalian therapsids from the Middle Permian.
