= Phreatosuchus =

Phreatosuchus Temporal range: Permian

Scientific classification
- Kingdom: Animalia
- Phylum: Chordata
- Clade: Synapsida
- Clade: Therapsida
- Suborder: †Dinocephalia
- Family: †Phreatosuchidae
- Genus: †Phreatosuchus; Efremov, 1954
- Species: †P. qualeni

Binomial name
- †Phreatosuchus qualeni Efremov, 1954

Extinct genus of therapsids

Phreatosuchus is an extinct genus of basal dinocephalian therapsids.

== See also ==
- List of therapsids
