= Eurosaurus =

Scientific classification
- Domain: Eukaryota
- Kingdom: Animalia
- Phylum: Chordata
- Clade: Synapsida
- Genus: †Eurosaurus

Extinct genus of synapsids

Eurosaurus is an extinct genus of non-mammalian synapsids. Its taxonomic history is intertwined with that of the therapsids Brithopus and Orthopus and the temnospondyl Melosaurus.

In the 1830s and 1840s, Permian fossils were found in copper-bearing sandstones of Orenburg Governorate of the Russian Empire. Among these bones was a partial humerus, which Fischer van Waldheim described as Eurosaurus in 1841 or 1842. Fischer did not name a type species, and did not figure the type specimen, the identity of which is uncertain. In 1860, Eichwald united Eurosaurus, Brithopus, Orthopus, and Melosaurus uralensis under the name Eurosaurus uralensis. In 1866, von Meyer separated Melosaurus from Eurosaurus, and described Eurosaurus, Brithopus, and Orthopus under the name Eurosaurus verus.

Based on Fischer's brief description, it is possible that the specimen was from a dinocephalian.

== See also ==
- List of therapsids

== Bibliography ==
- Ivakhnenko, M. F. (2008). Подкласс Theromorpha [Subclass Theromorpha]. In Ivakhnenko, M. F.; Kurochkin, E. N. (eds.). Ископаемые позвоночные России и сопредельных стран. Ископаемые рептилии и птицы [Fossil vertebrates of Russia and adjacent countries: Fossil reptiles and birds: Part 1] (in Russian). ГЕОС. ISBN 978-5-89118-415-6. LCCN 2009375477.
- Seeley, Harry Govier (1889). "Researches on the structure, organization, and classification of the fossil Reptilia. VI. On the anomodont Reptilia and their allies". Philosophical Transactions of the Royal Society of London B. 180: 215–296. Bibcode:1889RSPTB.180..215S. JSTOR 91717.
