= Molybdopygus =

Molybdopygus Temporal range: Middle Permian

Scientific classification
- Kingdom: Animalia
- Phylum: Chordata
- Clade: Synapsida
- Clade: Therapsida
- Suborder: †Dinocephalia
- Family: †Estemmenosuchidae
- Genus: †Molybdopygus; Tchudinov, 1964

Type species
- †M. arcanus Tchudinov, 1964

Extinct genus of therapsids

Molybdopygus is an extinct genus of estemmenosuchid dinocephalians from the Middle Permian of Russia. It is known from a single pelvis.

== See also ==
- List of therapsids
