= Phreatosaurus =

Phreatosaurus Temporal range: Permian

Scientific classification
- Domain: Eukaryota
- Kingdom: Animalia
- Phylum: Chordata
- Clade: Synapsida
- Clade: Therapsida
- Suborder: †Dinocephalia
- Family: †Phreatosuchidae
- Genus: †Phreatosaurus; Efremov, 1954

Species
- P. bazhovi Efremov, 1954; P. menneri Efremov, 1954

Extinct genus of therapsids

Phreatosaurus is an extinct genus of basal dinocephalian therapsids.

== See also ==
- List of therapsids
