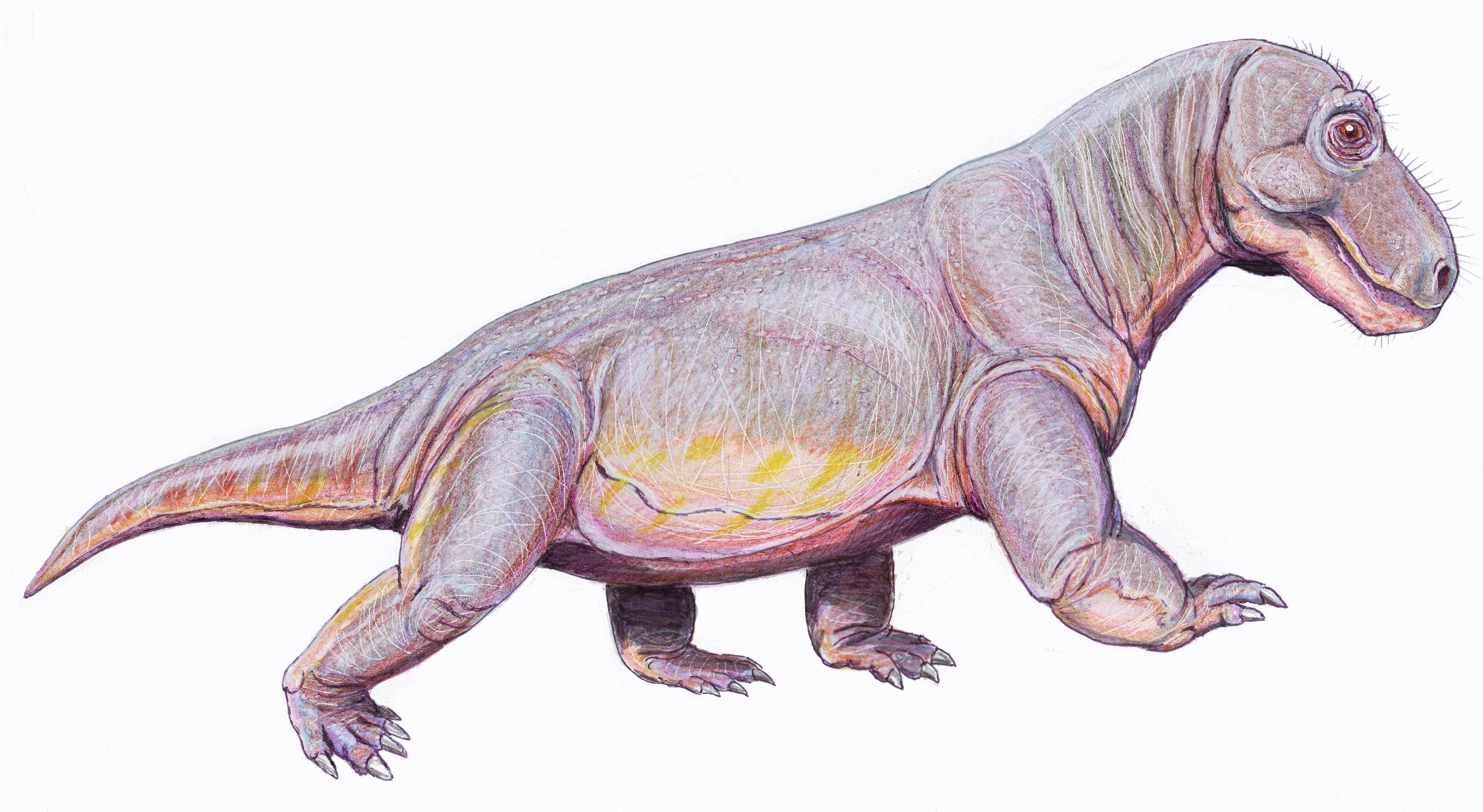
- Speculative reconstruction of a rhopalodontid, based mostly on Parabradysaurus

Scientific classification
- Kingdom: Animalia
- Phylum: Chordata
- Clade: Synapsida
- Clade: Therapsida
- Suborder: †Dinocephalia
- Family: †Estemmenosuchidae
- Genus: †Parabradysaurus; Efremov, 1954
- Species: †P. udmurticus

Binomial name
- †Parabradysaurus udmurticus Efremov, 1954

= Parabradysaurus =

Parabradysaurus Temporal range: Wordian

Extinct genus of therapsids

Parabradysaurus is an extinct genus of rhopalodontid dinocephalian synapsids. It is known from a few serrated teeth that indicate this animal was like herbivorous.

== See also ==
- List of therapsids
