= Phreatosuchidae =

Phreatosuchidae Temporal range: Middle Permian

Scientific classification
- Domain: Eukaryota
- Kingdom: Animalia
- Phylum: Chordata
- Clade: Synapsida
- Clade: Therapsida
- Suborder: †Dinocephalia
- Family: †Phreatosuchidae; Efremov, 1954

Genera
- Phreatosuchus; Phreatosaurus

Extinct family of therapsids

Phreatosuchidae is an extinct family of basal dinocephalians.

It contains two genera, Phreatosuchus and Phreatosaurus.
