= Charitosaurus =

Scientific classification
- Domain: Eukaryota
- Kingdom: Animalia
- Phylum: Chordata
- Class: Reptilia
- Superorder: †Sauropterygia
- Family: †Pachypleurosauridae
- Genus: †Charitosaurus; Meyer, 1838

Type species
- †Charitosaurus tschudii Meyer, 1838

Extinct genus of reptiles

Charitosaurus is an extinct genus of pachypleurosaur.

== See also ==
- List of plesiosaurs
