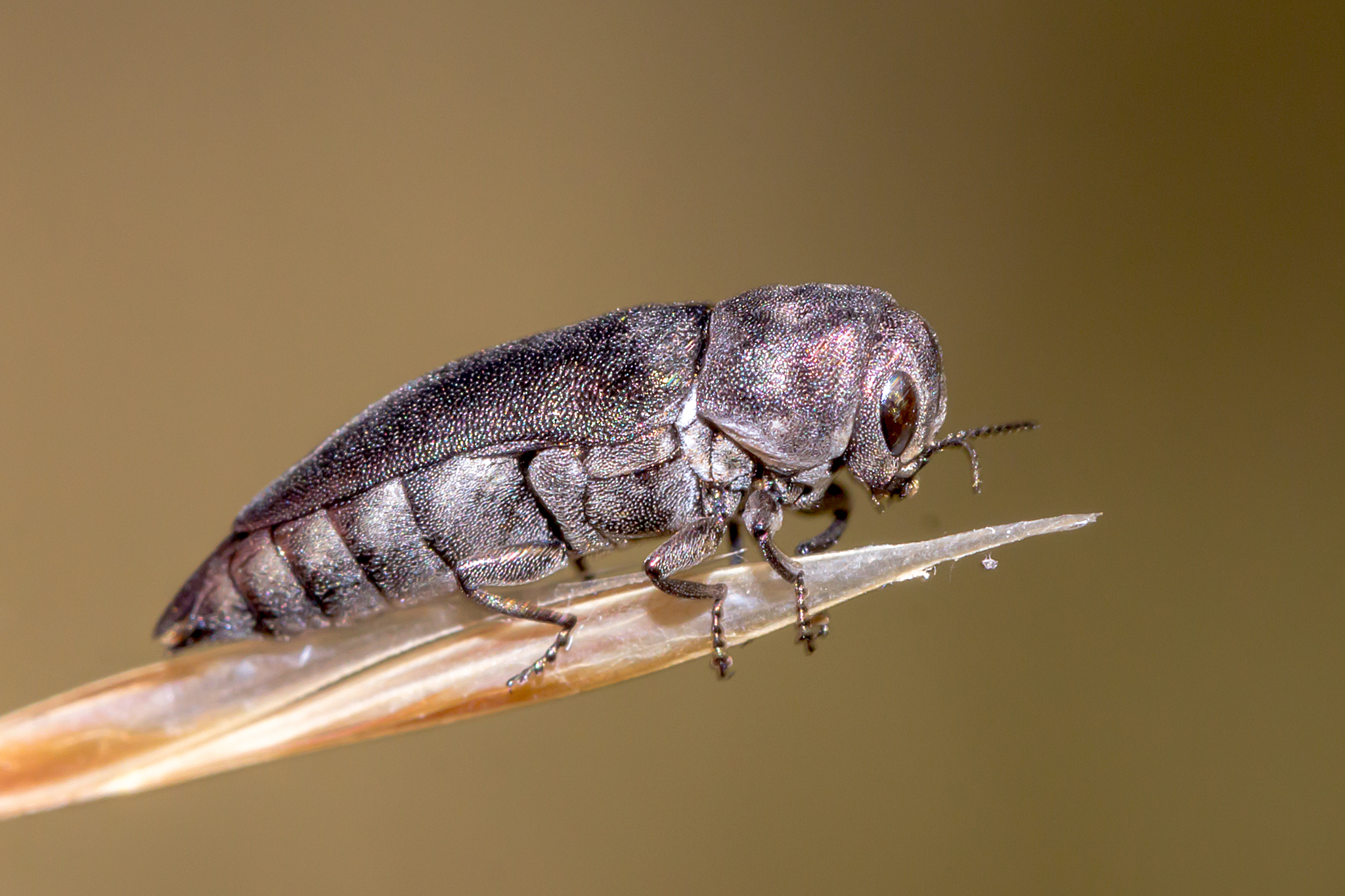
- Dinocephalia thoracica, Australia

Scientific classification
- Kingdom: Animalia
- Phylum: Arthropoda
- Class: Insecta
- Order: Coleoptera
- Suborder: Polyphaga
- Infraorder: Elateriformia
- Family: Buprestidae
- Subfamily: Agrilinae
- Tribe: Coraebini
- Genus: Dinocephalia; Obenberger, 1923

= Dinocephalia (beetle) =

Genus of beetles

Dinocephalia is a genus of beetles in the family Buprestidae, found in Australia.

== Species ==
These species belong to the genus Dinocephalia:

- Dinocephalia browni (Carter, 1933)
- Dinocephalia burnsi Bellamy, 1988
- Dinocephalia carteri (Obenberger, 1943)
- Dinocephalia cyaneipennis (Blackburn, 1893)
- Dinocephalia leucogaster Bellamy, 1988
- Dinocephalia thoracica (Kerremans, 1900)
- Dinocephalia transsecta (Carter, 1921)
