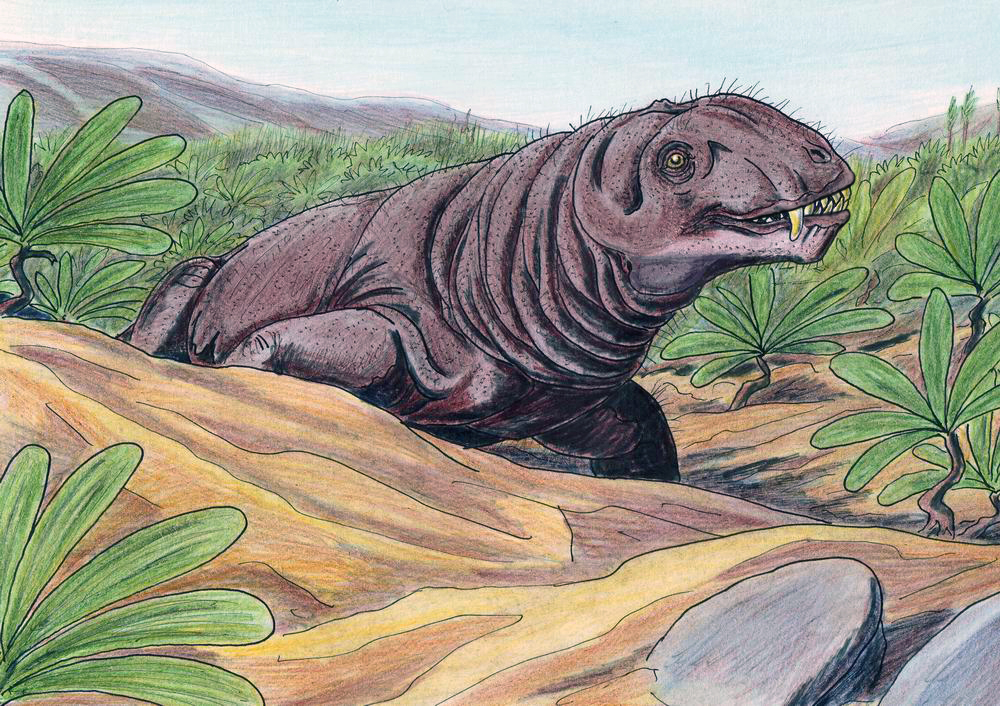
- Deuterosaurus biarmicus

Scientific classification
- Kingdom: Animalia
- Phylum: Chordata
- Clade: Synapsida
- Clade: Therapsida
- Suborder: †Dinocephalia
- Family: †Deuterosauridae
- Genus: †Deuterosaurus; Eichwald, 1846

Type species
- Deuterosaurus biarmicus Eichwald, 1846

Species
- D. biarmicus Eichwald, 1846; ?D. jubilaei (Nopcsa, 1928); D. seeleyi Nopcsa, 1902

= Deuterosaurus =

Deuterosaurus Temporal range: Capitanian

Extinct genus of therapsids

Deuterosaurus is an extinct genus of dinocephalian therapsids.

== Etymology ==
Deuterosaurus comes from Greek δευτερος "second" and σαυρος "lizard".

== Taxonomy ==
- Deuterosaurus biarmicus, the type species of Deuterosaurus, was named by Eduard Eichwald in 1846 based on a series of vertebrae and ribs. Efremov erroneously listed "Deuterosaurus mnemionalis" as a synonym of D. biarmicus, although no such species was ever named. Kammerer 2011 suggested that this taxon was a tapinocephalian of some kind.
- Deuterosaurus seeleyi was named by Franz Nopcsa in 1902, based on a specimen consisting of 13 ribs.
- Deuterosaurus jubilaei was named by Nopcsa in 1928, originally as representing a distinct genus, Mnemeiosaurus. Boonstra and Tchudinov agreed that Mnemeiosaurus and Deuterosaurus were distinct genera, whereas Efremov and Ivakhnenko considered Mnemeiosaurus a synonym of Deuterosaurus, albeit with D. jubilaei still a distinct species.
- Deuterosaurus gigas was named by Ivan Efremov in 1954 based on teeth. It was later reassigned to Ulemosaurus

== Anatomy ==
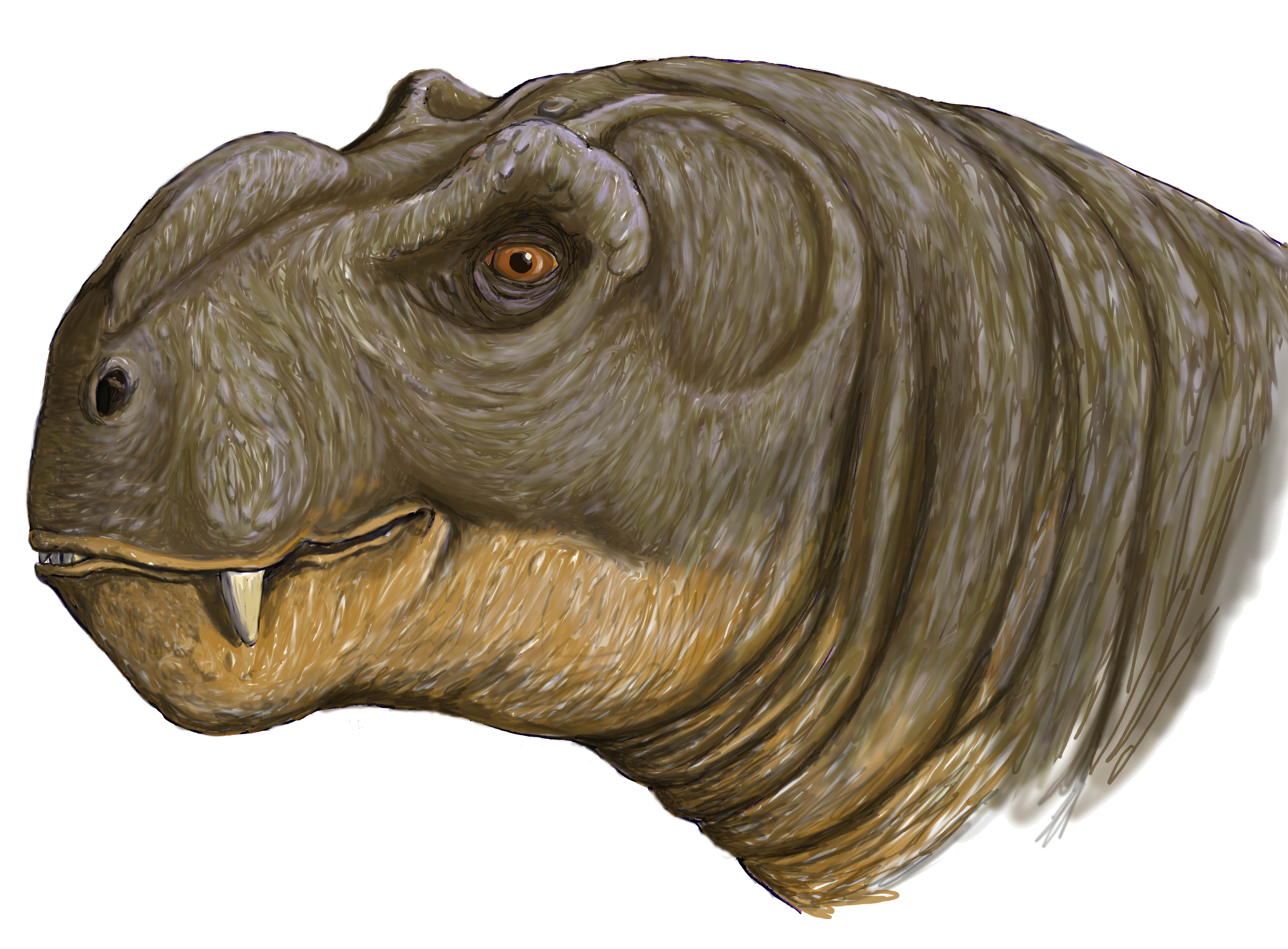
D. jubilaei head

Skulls of Deuterosaurus are well known from several finds. It is over 10 inches (25 cm) high, with a long snout and conical teeth. Like all anteosaurs, the skull possessed long, dagger-like canine teeth. The skull was rather short for an anteosaur, with a broad cheek region, indicating a very strong bite. The eyes were partly slanted forward, giving it at least partial stereo vision. The pineal eye, though small, had a well formed opening right atop the brain case.

Deuterosaurus was a very large animal, the size of a modern grizzly bear. T. H. Huxley mistakenly considered it to be a dinosaur. Judging from related therapsids, the short but massive legs were held splayed, much like a modern crocodile. When walking, the tail would have swung sideways, like in modern reptiles.

== Biology ==
Deuterosaurus is found in what is now Siberia, which in the Permian was dominated by temperate lowlands. Deuterosaurus was among the largest animals of its day, and has variously been interpreted as a herbivore or carnivore. While the large canines may indicate the ability to kill prey, the short legs and massive body would have made it unsuited as a long distance runner, and better suited to eating plants. Then again, the possible stereoscopic vision again indicates an ambush style carnivore, and the rather blunt, cone-like post canine teeth can be interpreted both ways. Possibly Deuterosaurus was omnivorous, like a modern bear.

Deuterosaurus, like all its therapsid cousins, probably laid eggs. A remarkable thickening of the skull above the eyes indicates it may have engaged in head-butting, possibly in connection with mating or territorial disputes.

== See also ==
- List of therapsids
