= Rhopalodon =

Rhopalodon Temporal range: Middle Permian

Scientific classification
- Kingdom: Animalia
- Phylum: Chordata
- Clade: Synapsida
- Clade: Therapsida
- Suborder: †Dinocephalia
- Family: †Rhopalodontidae
- Genus: †Rhopalodon; Fischer, 1841
- Species: †R. wangenheimi

Binomial name
- †Rhopalodon wangenheimi Fischer, 1841

Extinct genus of therapsids

Rhopalodon is an extinct genus of therapsids from the Permian of Russia. It has been variously classified as a dinosaur, a dinocephalian, or another branch of amniotes. Rhopalodon is notable for being among the first "reptiles" mentioned in Nature. T.H. Huxley wrote of this animal, among others, in the inaugural issue of the magazine, in November 1869. He gave the age of this animal and of the contemporary Deuterosaurus as Triassic, but both are now known to have lived during the Middle Permian.

According to Tverdokhlebov et al. (2005), Rhopalodon was a medium-sized terrestrial dinocephalian herbivore that was characteristic of the early Tatarian Urzhumian biostratigraphic zone (Bolshekinelskaya and Amanakskaya svitas).

== See also ==
- List of therapsids
