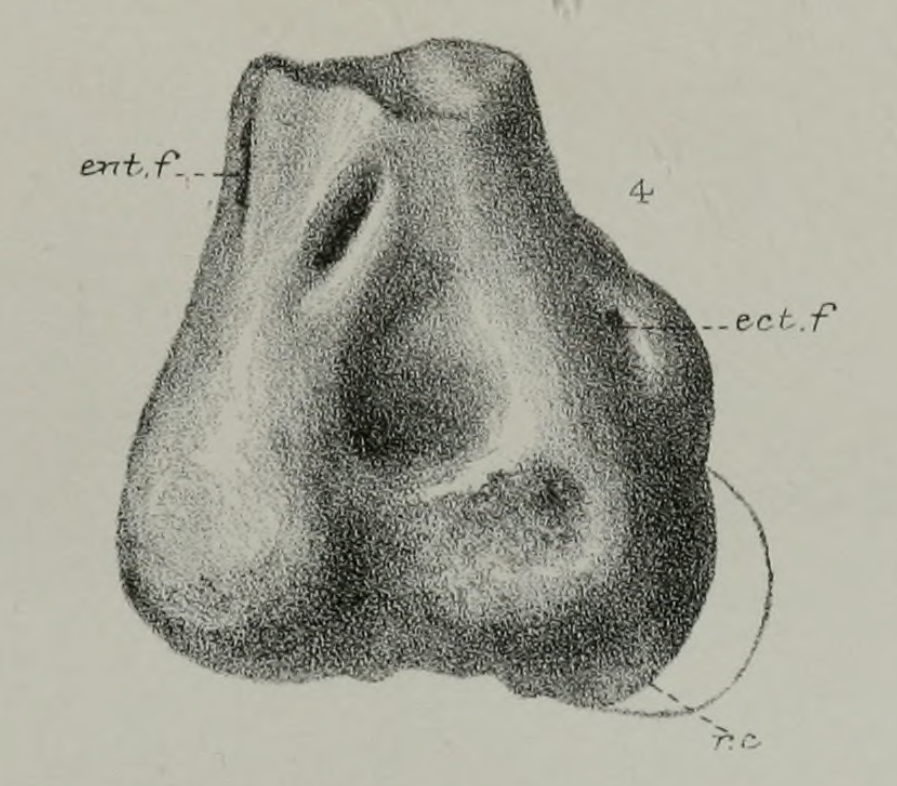
- Brithopus priscus limb element

Scientific classification
- Kingdom: Animalia
- Phylum: Chordata
- Clade: Synapsida
- Clade: Therapsida
- Suborder: †Dinocephalia
- Family: †Brithopodidae
- Genus: †Brithopus; Kutorga, 1838
- Species: †B. priscus

Binomial name
- †Brithopus priscus Kutorga, 1838

Synonyms
- Rhopalodon murchisoni Fischer, 1845; Dinosaurus murchisoni (Fischer, 1845)

= Brithopus =

Brithopus Temporal range: Middle Permian, Ufimian

Extinct genus of mammal ancestors

Brithopus is an extinct genus of dinocephalian therapsids. It contains a single species, Brithopus priscus, known from fragmentary remains found in the Copper Sandstones near Isheevo, Russia.

== Description ==
Brithopus was fairly large, reaching a length of 2.5–3 m (8–10 ft). The skull was similar to Titanophoneus, but more massive and heavily built.

== Classification ==
B. priscus was first named in 1838 and was traditionally classified in the Anteosauria, a group of carnivorous dinocephalians. Brithopus served as the basis for the family Brithopodidae, which once included many anteosaurian species. Because it is based on fragmentary material, Brithopus is regarded as a nomen dubium by some researchers, including Christian Kammerer, who in a 2011 study stated that it had been used as a "wastebasket taxon for Ural copper measures dinocephalian postcranial material". Kammerer suggested that Brithopus priscus was not an anteosaur and was likely a tapinocephalian of some kind.

Dinosaurus and Eurosaurus have both been considered synonyms of Brithopus.

== See also ==
- List of therapsids
