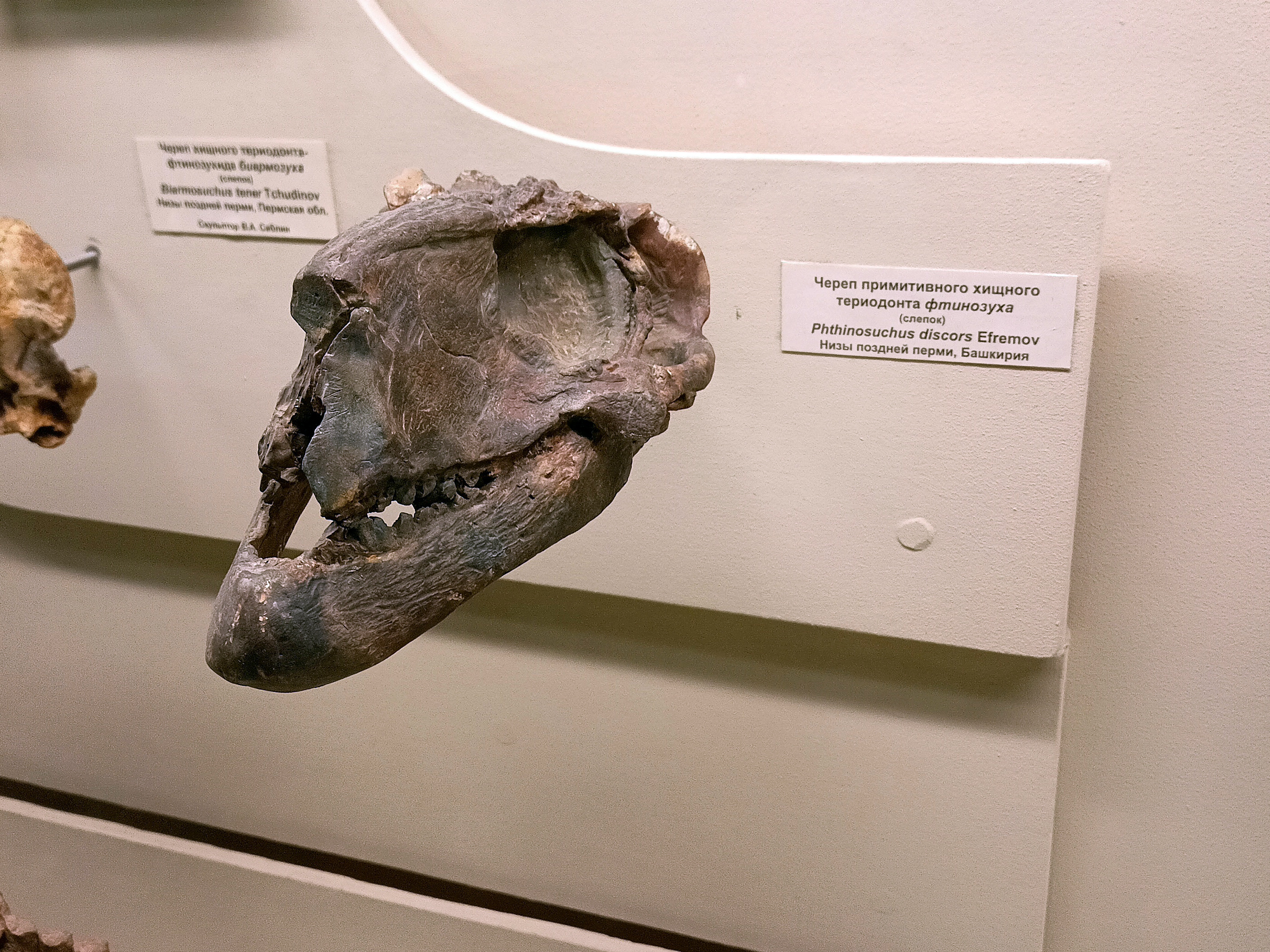
- Skull in Moscow Paleontological Museum

Scientific classification
- Kingdom: Animalia
- Phylum: Chordata
- Clade: Synapsida
- Clade: Therapsida
- Suborder: †Dinocephalia (?)
- Family: †Phthinosuchidae; Yefremov, 1954
- Genus: †Phthinosuchus; Yefremov, 1954

Type species
- †Phthinosuchus discors Yefremov, 1954

= Phthinosuchus =

Phthinosuchus Temporal range: Middle Permian, 268–265.8 Ma

Extinct genus of therapsids

Phthinosuchus is an extinct genus of therapsids from the Middle Permian of Russia. Phthinosuchus is the sole member of the family Phthinosuchidae. Phthinosuchus may have been one of the most primitive therapsids, meaning that its ancestors may have branched off early from the main therapsid line.

== Discovery ==
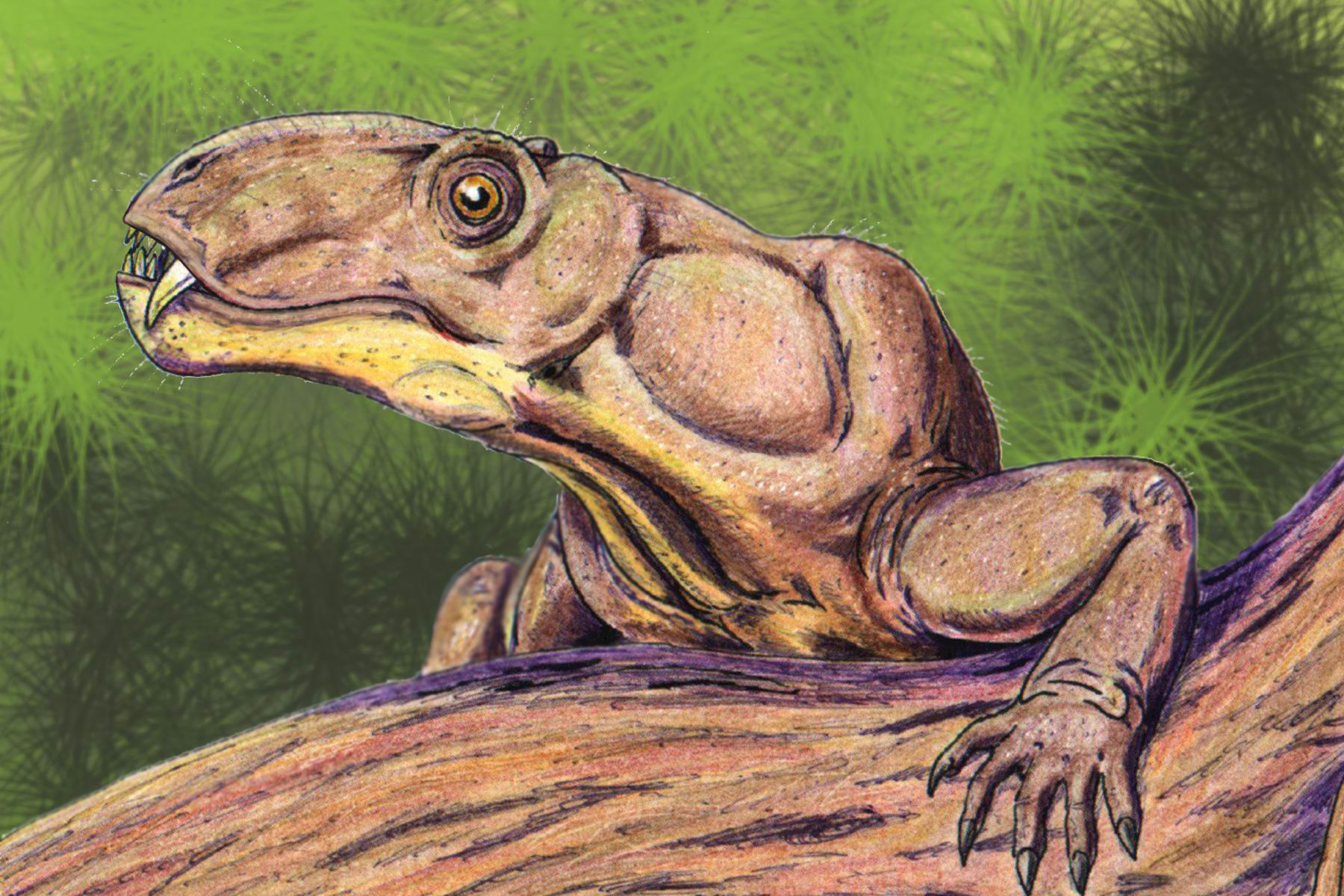
Life restoration

Phthinosuchus was named in 1954 by Ivan Yefremov. It is currently only known from the back of the skull, as the front of the skull was lost after description. Two species, P. discors and P. horissiaki, have been described.

== Description ==
Phthinosuchus was 1.5 m (5 ft) long with a 20 cm skull, and looked much like the Sphenacodontids, such as Dimetrodon and Sphenacodon. Its temporal fenestrae were larger than those of the Sphenacodontids. Its jaw was slender, unlike other predatory therapsids, but like the other early therapsids, it was probably sprawling and carnivorous.

== Classification ==
Phthinosuchus is a member of the suborder Phthinosuchia, which was made specifically for Phthinosuchus given that it did not fit into any other suborder.

== See also ==
- List of therapsids
- Evolution of mammals
- Dinocephalians
