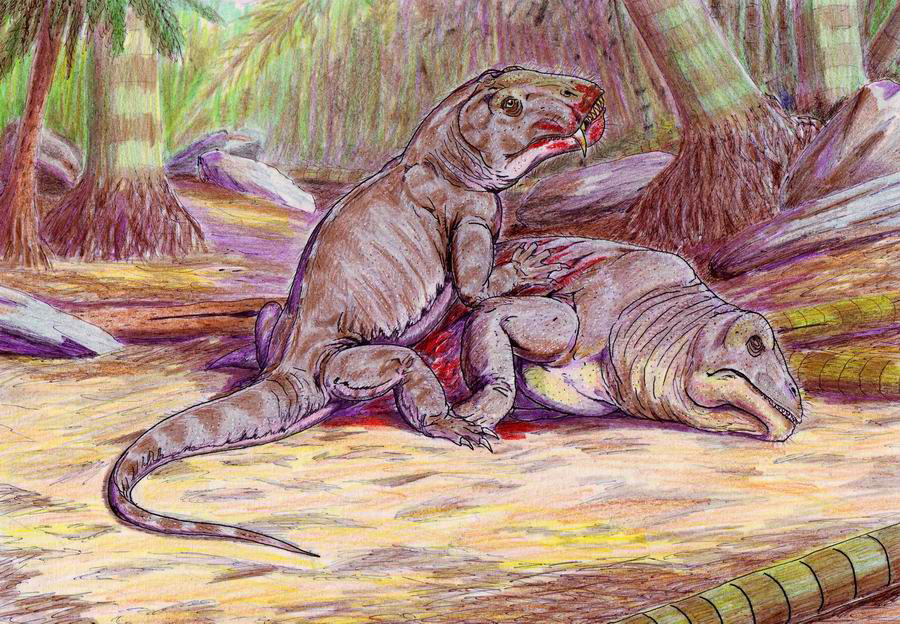
- Restoration of two genera of dinocephalians : Titanophoneus (an anteosaur) devouring a Ulemosaurus (a tapinocephalid).

Scientific classification
- Kingdom: Animalia
- Phylum: Chordata
- Clade: Synapsida
- Clade: Therapsida
- Suborder: †Dinocephalia; Seeley, 1894

Subgroups
- Anteosauria; Tapinocephalia; Estemmenosuchidae; Styracocephalidae; Tapinocephalidae; Titanosuchidae; For others, see internal classification

= Dinocephalia =

Dinocephalia Temporal range: Guadalupian (Middle Permian), 274.4–260 Ma

Extinct clade of therapsid stem-mammals

Dinocephalia (from Ancient Greek δεινός deinos, "terrible" and κεφαλή kephalḗ, "head") is a clade of generally large-bodied therapsids that flourished during the Middle Permian (Guadalupian epoch) between approximately 275 and 260 million years ago (Ma), until their abrupt extinction as part of the Capitanian mass extinction event. Dinocephalians included carnivorous (Anteosauria), as well as herbivorous and omnivorous (Tapinocephalia) forms, serving as both dominant megaherbivores and apex predators. Many species had thickened skulls with many knobs and bony projections. Dinocephalians were the first non-mammalian therapsids to be scientifically described, and their fossils are known from Russia, China, Brazil, South Africa, Zimbabwe, and Tanzania.

== Description ==
=== Size ===
Size of various dinocephalians compared to a human

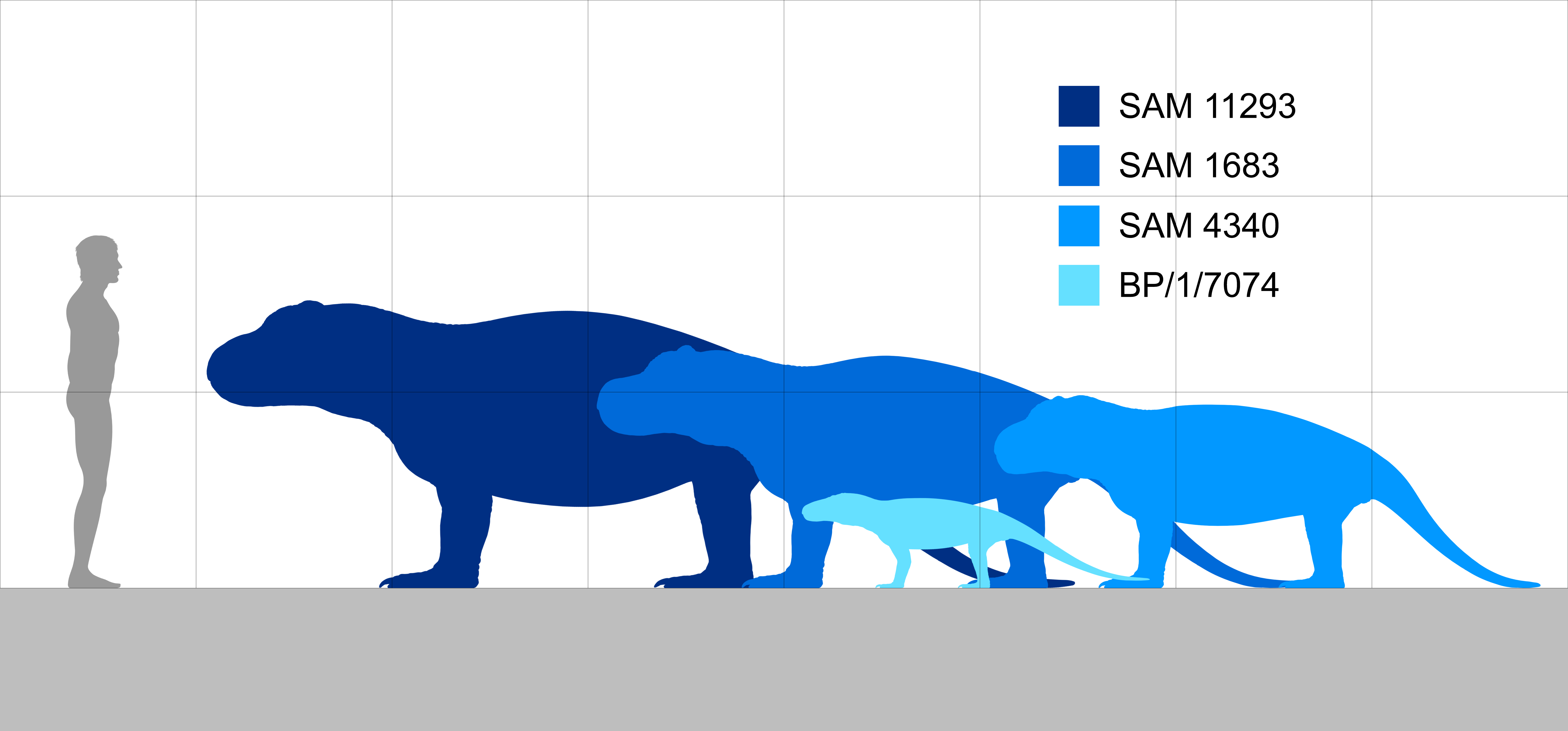
Size of Anteosaurus, a carnivorous anteosaur

Size of Jonkeria, a herbivorous or omnivorous titanosuchid

Size of Moschops, a herbivorous tapinocephalid

Dinocephalians were generally large in size, and some the largest animals of the Permian period, and the first synapsids to reach a body size around one tonne. The herbivorous or omnivorous Jonkeria has been suggested to have weighed 989 kilograms (2,180 lb), while the large carnivore Anteosaurus has been estimated to weigh 400 kilograms (880 lb) based on scaled 3D models.

=== Skull and jaws ===
The skulls and lower jaws of dinocephalians are unified by a number of characters, including the loss of the vomerine process of the premaxilla (the tooth-bearing bone at the front of the upper jaw) such that the vomer bone borders the main part of the premaxilla, the transverse flange of the pterygoid bone of the palate is forward of the eye socket (orbit), there is lack of fossae (depressions) or ridges on the outward-facing (lateral) surface of the reflected lamina (a plate of bone found on the lower jaw of synapsids) of the angular bone, and the presence between prearticular and angular on the lower jaw of a foramen (an opening for blood vessels, nerves, etc) visible on the inner surface.

Skull bone diagrams of dinocephalians

Skull of Syodon (Anteosauria)

Skull diagram of Jonkeria (Titanosuchidae)

Skull diagram of Moschops (Tapinocephalidae)

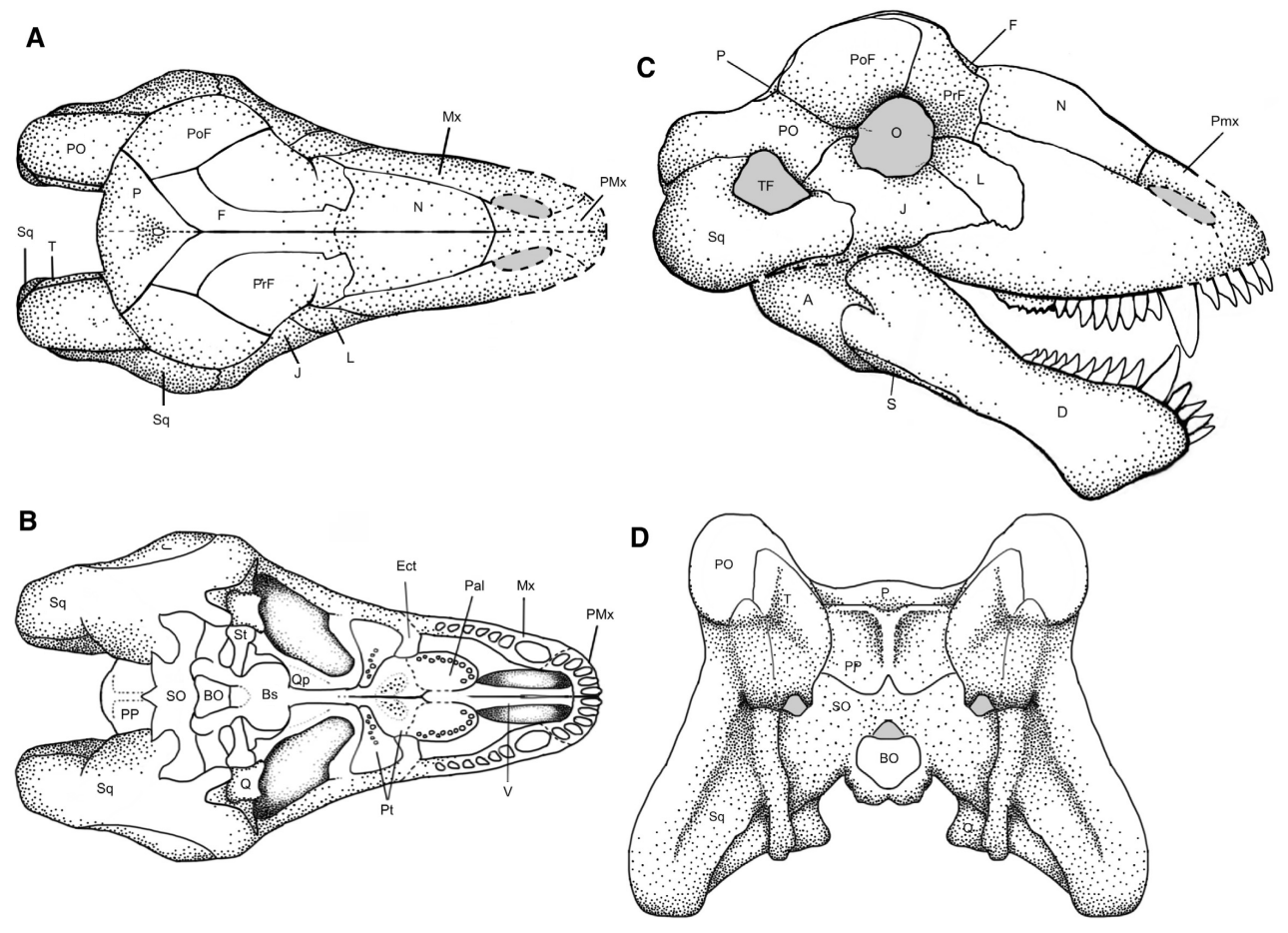
Skull of Styracocephalus (Styracocephalidae)

The temporal fenestra at the back of the skull is relatively enlarged in dinocephalians,^{11} with the quadrate and quadratojugal bones at the back of the skull also being enlarged.^{38} The premaxillary bones at the front of the snout unusually among therapsids have a long posteriorly directed spur-like process between the paired nasal bones, which in some dinocephalians causes the nasal bones to not contact each other, due to the premaxillae reaching all the way to the frontal bones. The septomaxilla (a skull bone associated with the nostril opening) generally has a small exposure on the skull surface. There is no preparietal bone unlike some other therapsids. The prefrontal and lacrimal bones are generally large and form part of the border of the orbit (eye socket). The tabular bone at the back of the skull is generally large. The zygomatic arch is made up of the squamosal bone. The size and shape of the single temporal fenestra is variable, from small and slit-like to large. The quadratojugal is elongate which supports the quadrate to its sides, which is large elongated forwards (anteriorly) and downwards (ventrally). The stapes are short and thick.^{38-41}

Cranial ornamentation in dinocephalians

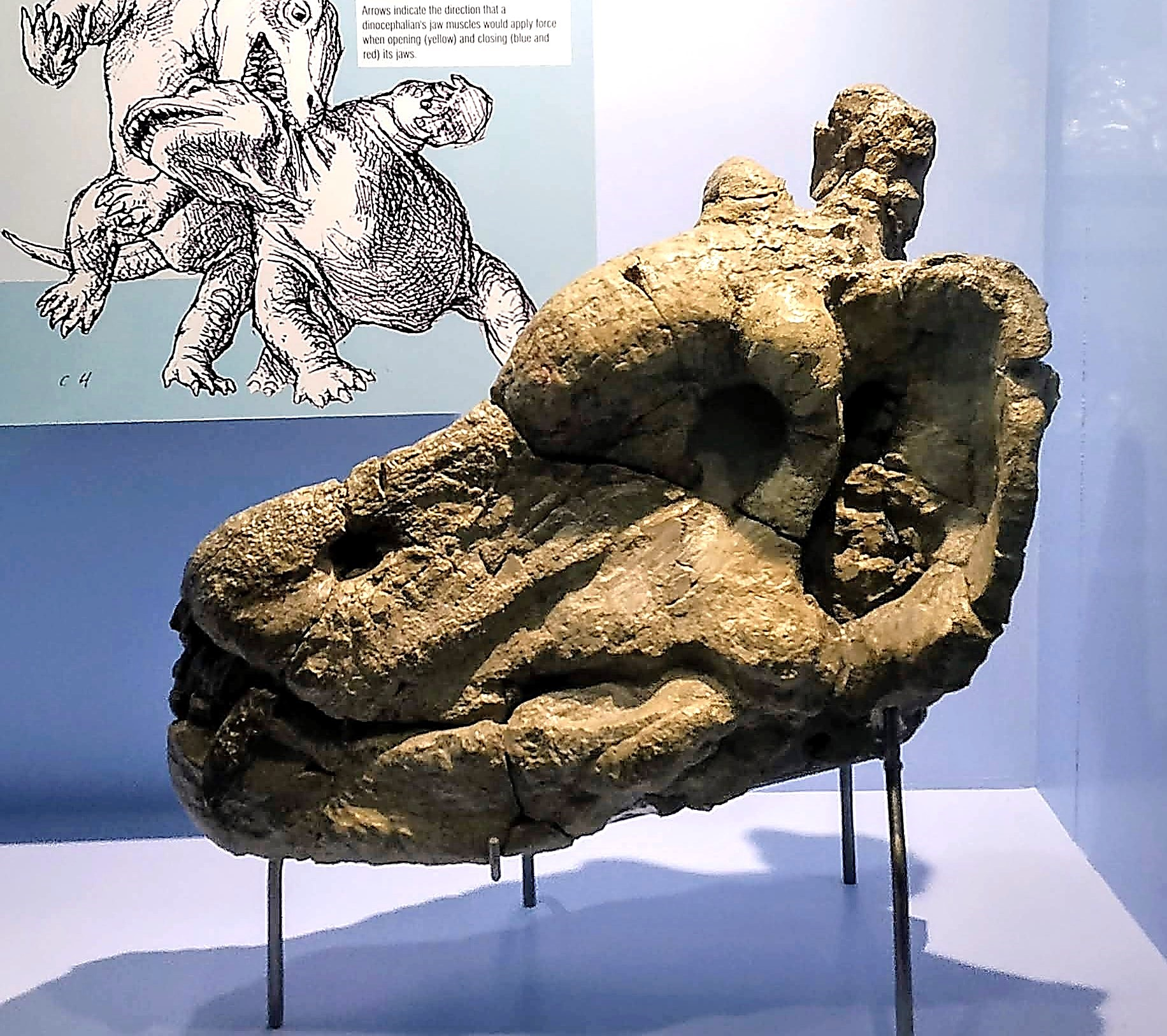
Skull of Anteosaurus (Anteosauria)

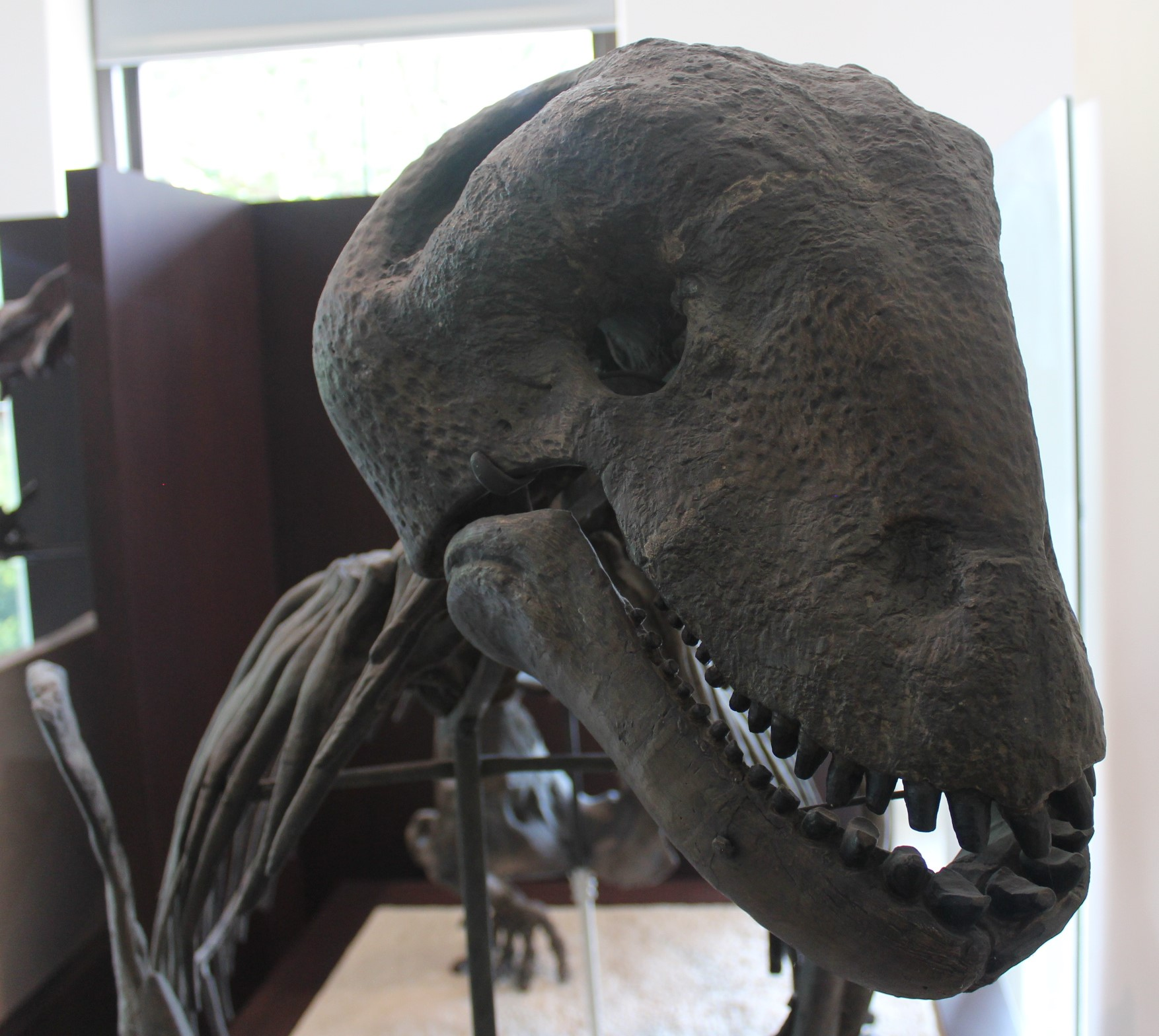
Skull of Moschops (Tapinocephalidae)

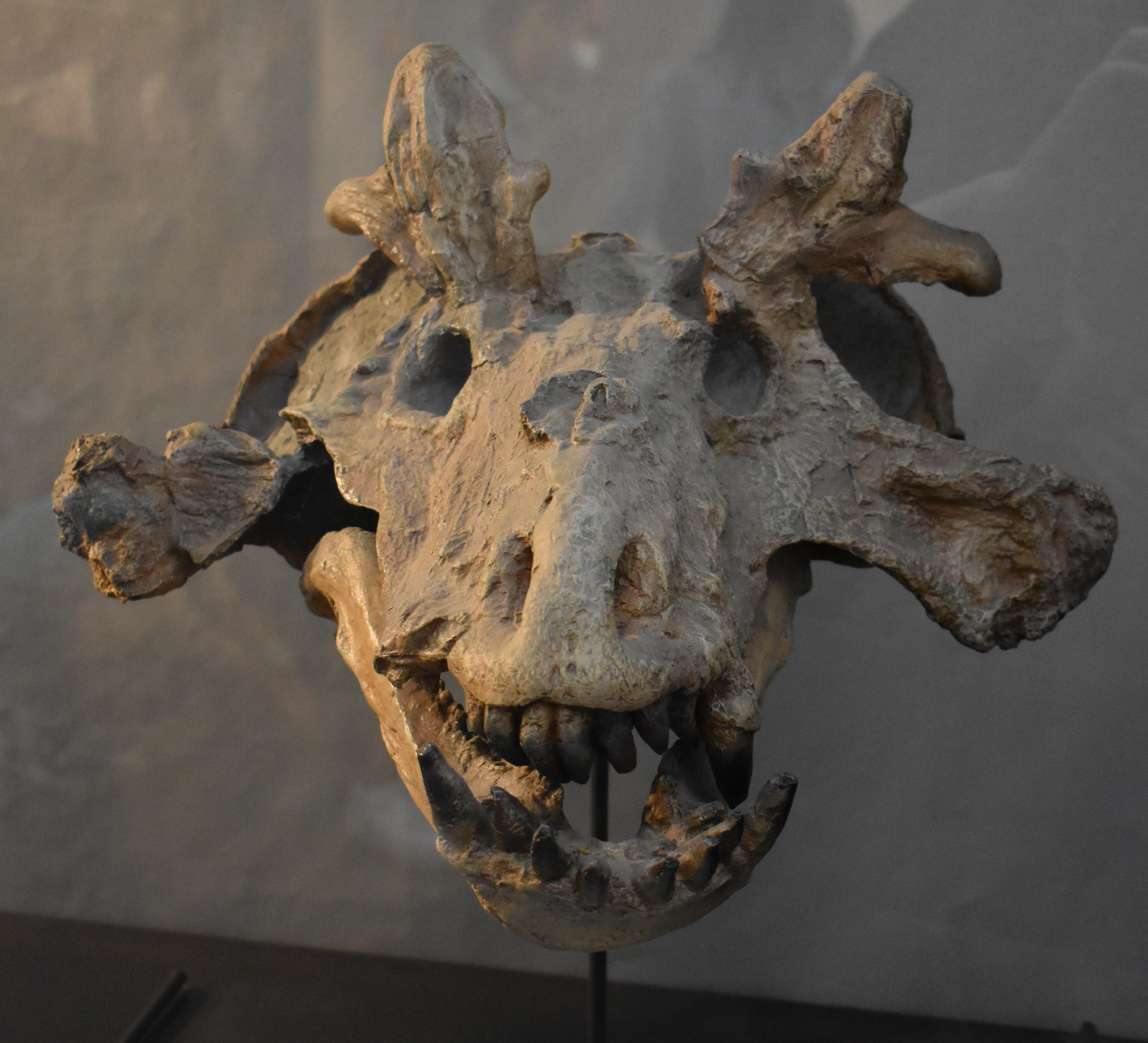
Skull of Estemmenosuchus

Most dinocephalians also developed a thickened (pachyostotic) and ornamented skull roof and braincase of varying and diverse form, sometimes with horn-like projections, making their skulls highly strong and resistant to fracture.

All dinocephalians are characterised by the interlocking incisor (front) teeth, though this was formerly thought to be unique to the group, it is also found in biarmosuchians. In tapinocephalids all teeth interlock rather than just the front incisors, though the back teeth interlock less closely. Dinocephalians ancestrally have a pair of enlarged "canine" teeth, towards the front of the mouth in both the upper and lower jaws, though in some dinocephalians such as many tapinocephalids no such teeth are present. The teeth generally have a morphology including a pointed "talon" and a "heel", with the heel serving to cut or crush food,^{41-45, 57} with this "talon and heel" morphology best developed in tapinocephalians, especially tapinocephalids, which show precise occlusion (interlocking) to effectively shear food. Some tapinocephalians like titanosuchids and estemmenosuchids have leaf-shaped post-canine teeth. In anteosaurs and titanosuchids, which have differentiated incisors and canines, there are generally 4-5 pairs of incisors and pair of canines in the upper and lower jaws, the number of postcanine teeth varies from 8-11 in both the upper and lower jaws in anteosaurs to 19 in the upper jaw and 18-21 in the lower jaw of titanosuchids. In tapinocephalids, the teeth generally show little differentiation from each other with often no distinct canines present, with 3-5 teeth in the premaxilla, 8-17 in the maxilla and 14-19 in the lower jaw.^{41-45, 57} Dinocephalians ancestrally possess palatal teeth (teeth on the roof of the mouth) on the pterygoid and palatine bones (with Estemmenosuchus also having teeth on the vomer uniquely among therapsids). Palatal teeth were completely lost in advanced tapinocephalids. The coronoid bones and the corresponding coronoid process on the lower jaw were lost in dinocephalians.^{11,38}

=== Postcranial skeleton ===
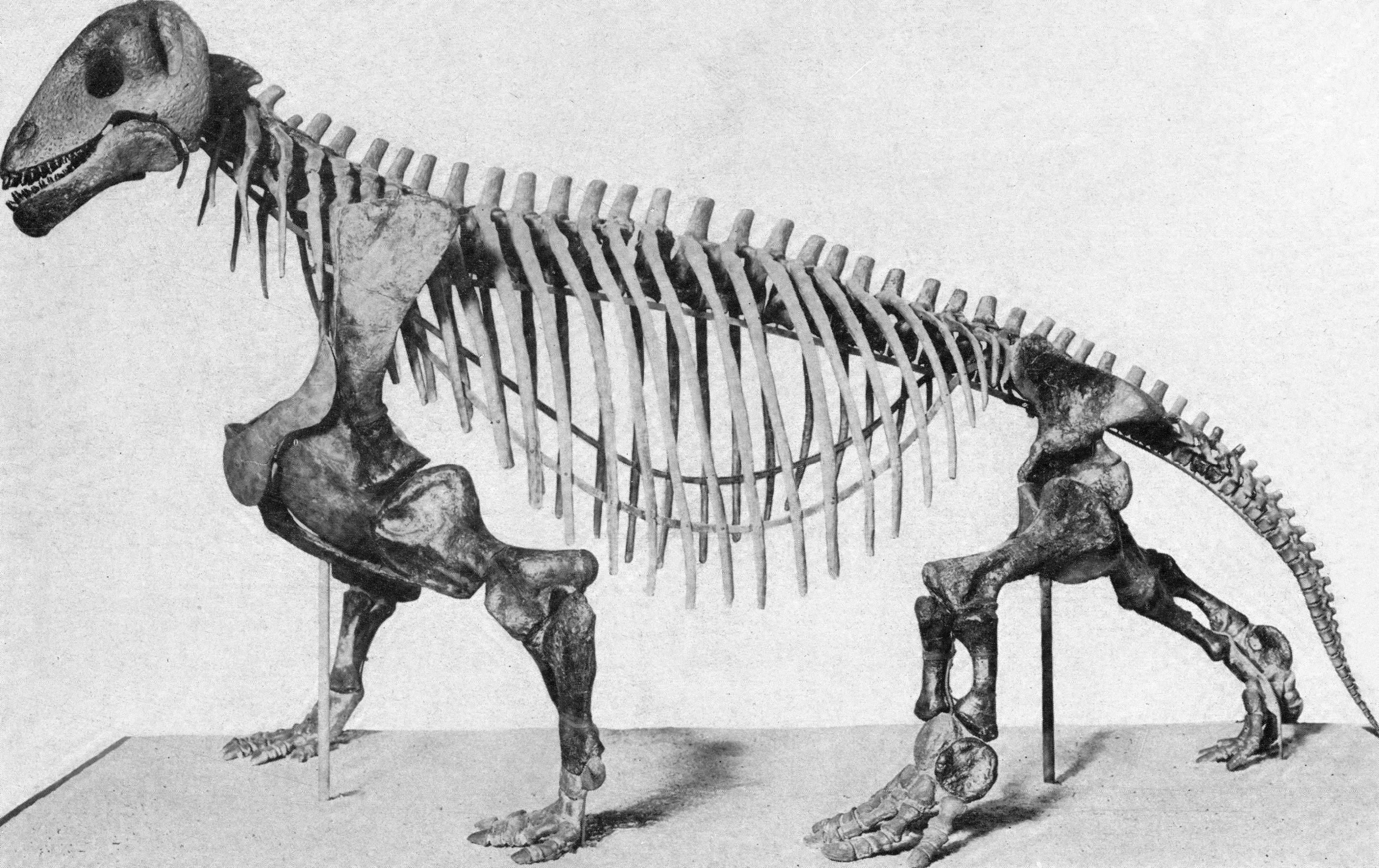
Skeleton of Moschops (Tapinocephalia, Tapinocephalidae)

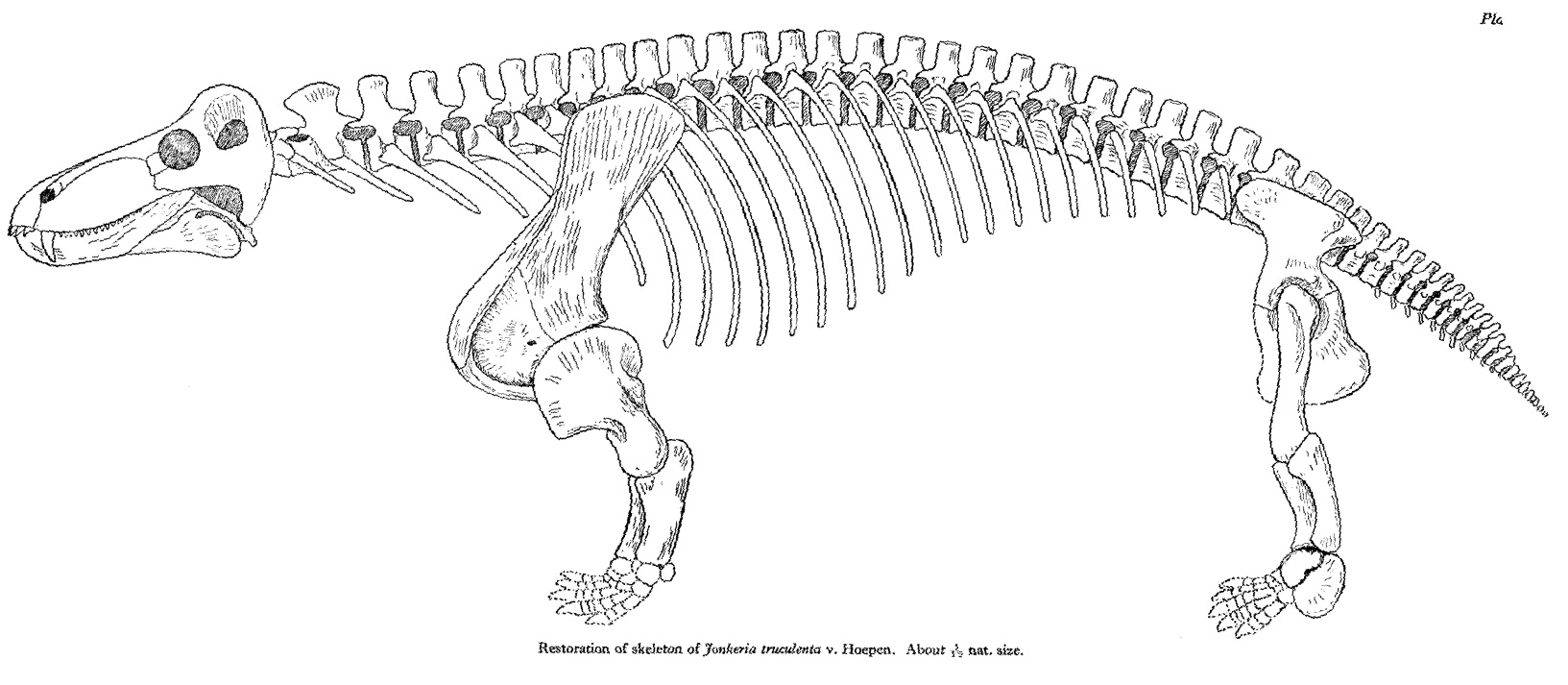
Skeleton of Jonkeria (Tapinocephalia, Titanosuchidae)

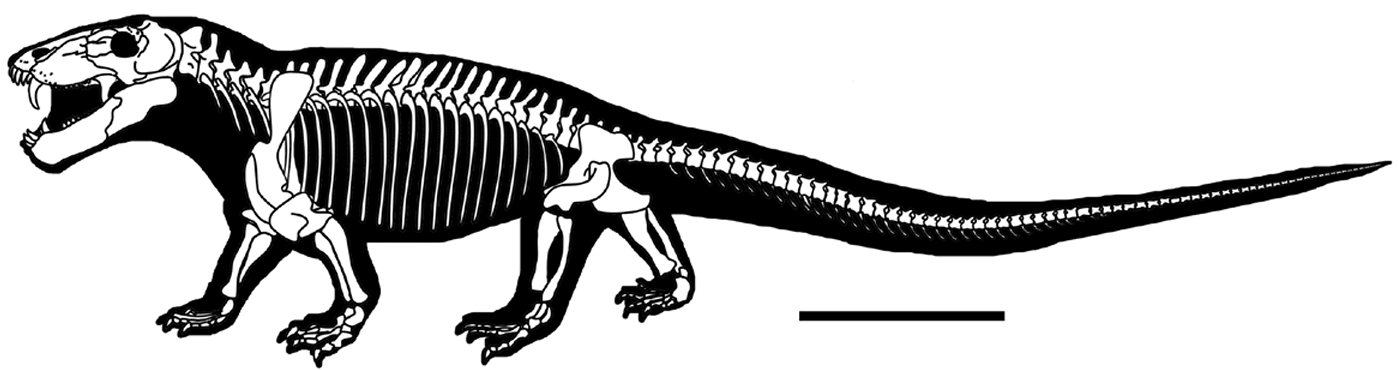
Skeleton of Titanophoneus (Anteosauria)

A proatlas bone between the atlas vertebra and the skull was probably present in dinocephalians. The vertebrae of dinocephalians are concave on both faces (amphicoelous). The neck typically has seven or eight cervical vertebrae, with around 33 vertebrae in total forward of the sacrum.^{46} The length of the tail and the corresponding number of caudal vertebrae varies considerably in dinocephalians, from seven caudals in the tapinocephalid Tapinocaninus, to over 60 in some anteosaurs. The caudal vertebrae get progressively shorter towards the tip of the tail.^{46} The caudal vertebrae and the atlas and axis vertebrae had associated intercentra, though these do not appear to have been present between the remaining cervical or dorsal (trunk) vertebrae.^{47} The cleithrum is reduced in size, The dorsal process of the coracoid has been lost.^{46} Dinocephalian limb bones are generally optimised for muscle strength. Dinocephalians are likely to have had a sprawling posture, or a posture intermediate between sprawling and upright.

=== Soft tissue ===
The dinocephalian Estemmenosuchus is well known for being one of the few non-mammalian therapsids (alongside the dicynodont Lystrosaurus) to have preserved skin impressions. The skin appears to be scaleless, and covered in numerous small tubercles around 0.3–0.45 millimetres (3/256–9/512 in) across, which may represent glands.

== Paleobiology ==
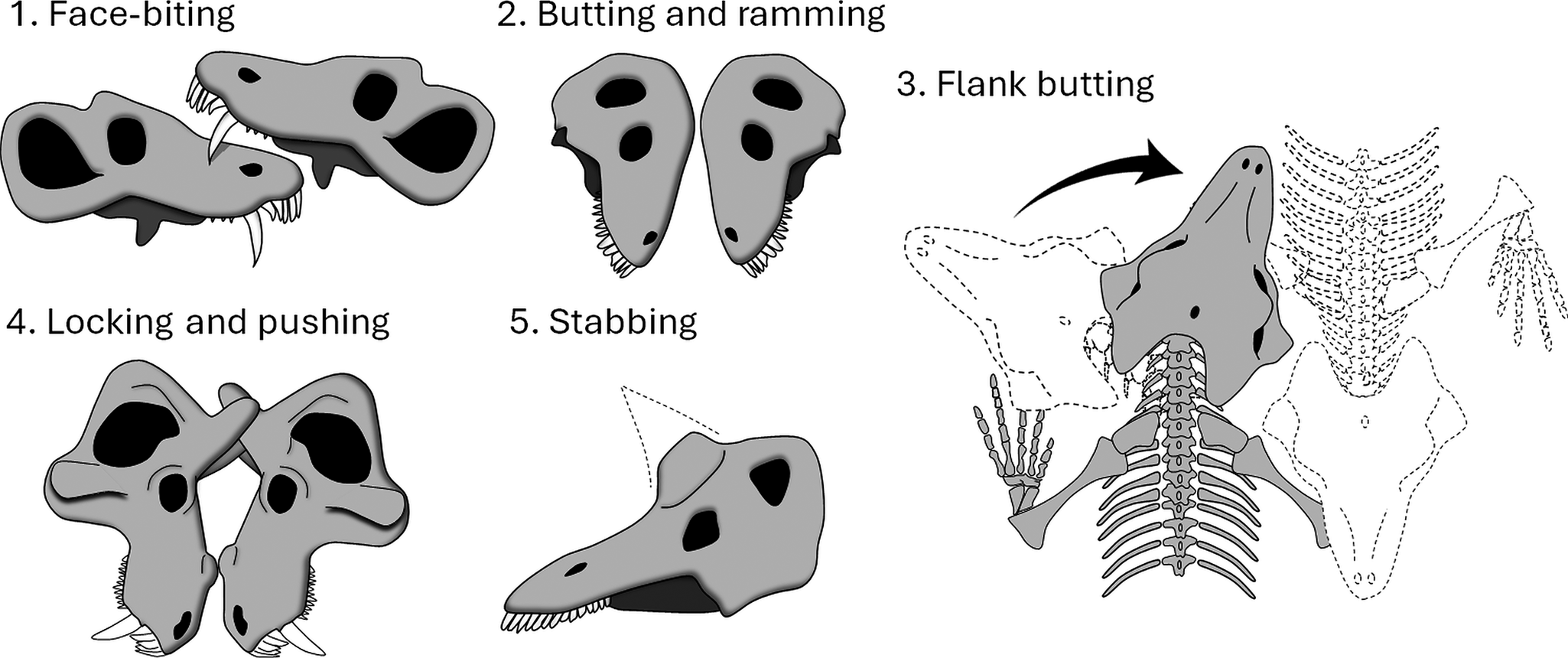
Suggested intraspecific combat styles in dinocephalians. 1/top left: Face biting (Anteosauria), 2/top centre: head-butting (Tapinocephalidae e.g. Moschops), 3/ left: flank butting (Styracocephalus) 4/bottom left: locking and pushing (Estemmenosuchus) 5. bottom centre: stabbing (Struthiocephalus)

Dinocephalians occupied a range of ecologies, with the anteosaurs being carnivores, and tapinocephalians including herbivores (Tapinocephalidae) and omnivores (Titanosuchidae). During the Middle Permian, tapinocephalian and anteosaurian dinocephalians were dominant megaherbivores and apex predators respectively. It has been disputed as to whether some dinocephalians like titanosuchids and tapinocephalids were semi-aquatic like hippopotamuses. It has been widely suggested that tapinocephalids engaged in head-butting, and other dinocephalians may have also engaged in head butting, as well as biting and/or head interlocking or swiping combat against rival individuals. Many dinocephalians appear to have had an enlarged brain cavity, which may have hosted thick protective tissue surrounding the brain, which may have helped absorb blows from head-on combat. This has led scholars to suggest at least some dinocephalians, particularly tapinocephalids, to have had complex, gregarious social behaviour, though other dinocephalians may have been solitary.

== Taxonomy and evolution ==
Dinocephalians were the first non-mammalian synapsids to be scientifically described. Remains of dinocephalians were first reported in the 19th century from Russia and South Africa. The earliest being Syodon, Brithopus and Orthopus, which were described by Stepan Kutorga in 1838 from remains found in the Russian Urals (though Syodon was not recognised to be a non-mammalian synapsid until the 1870s). Subsequent dinocephalians named include Rhopalodon by Gotthelf Fischer von Waldheim in 1841, Deuterosaurus by Karl Eichwald in 1846, Tapinocephalus in 1876 and Titanosuchus in 1879 by Richard Owen, and Delphinognathus by Harry Seeley in 1892 (Delphinognathus is today considered an indeterminate juvenile tapinocephalid). In 1894, Harry Seeley named Deuterosauria to encompass Rhopalodon and Deuterosaurus placing Deuterosauria as a suborder of Anomodontia. That same year, Seeley coined Dinocephalia to include Delphinognathus and Tapinocephalus, also as a suborder of Anomodontia. In 1903, Robert Broom included Rhopalodon and Deuteosaurus within the Therocephalia. By the 1910s Rhopalodon and Deuterosaurus were included within Dinocephalia, alongside Titanosuchus. During the mid 20th century, South African dinocephalians were subject to extensive study by Lieuwe Dirk Boonstra.^{5-6}

Up until the late 20th century, Dinocephalians were still often considered to be members of Anomodontia (the group which contains dicynodonts and their close relatives), but this view was questioned during the 1980s and 1990s, and today is no longer widely accepted. The dominant paradigm of therapsid relationships as of the mid 2020s placed Dinocephalia as the second earliest diverging major group of therapsids, with Biarmosuchia being the most basal (earliest diverging) group, with Anomodontia being more closely related to Theriodontia (which includes Gorgonopsia, Therocephalia and Cynodontia, the last of which includes living mammals). Cladogram below following this view:

- Sphenacodontia
  - Sphenacodontidae
  - Therapsida
    - Biarmosuchia
    - Eutherapsida
      - Dinocephalia
      - Neotherapsida
        - Anomodontia (incl. Dicynodontia)
        - Theriodontia
          - Gorgonopsia
          - Eutheriodontia
            - Therocephalia
            - Cynodontia (incl. Mammalia)

A 2026 study using a Bayesian inference analysis found Dinocephalia in a clade with Biarmosuchia (a clade historically named Dinomorpha), Raranimus and Biseridens at the base of Therapsida, while the strict consensus analysis of the same study found Rarinamus, Biarmosuchia, and a clade including Biseridens and Dinocephalia to form a polytomy at the base of Therapsida.

=== Internal classification ===
Dinocephalia is split into two major groups, the carnivorous Anteosauria, and the largely herbivorous Tapinocephalia. Anteosauria is currently considered to comprise a single family, Anteosauridae, while Tapinocephalia is divided into a number of families, including Estemmenosuchidae, Titanosuchidae, Styracocephalidae, and Tapinocephalidae.

Phylogeny of Dinocephalia following Fraser-King et al. 2019

- Dinocephalia
  - Anteosauria
    - Anteosauridae
  - Tapinocephalia
    - - Estemmenosuchidae
    - - - Styracocephalidae
      - - Titanosuchidae
        - Tapinocephalidae

Class Synapsida

- Order Therapsida
  - Suborder Dinocephalia
    - ?Family Phreatosuchidae
      - Phreatosaurus
      - Phreatosuchus
    - ?Family Phthinosuchidae
      - Phthinosuchus
      - ?Phthinosaurus
    - Family Rhopalodontidae
      - ?Phthinosaurus
      - Rhopalodon
    - Infraorder Anteosauria
      - Family Anteosauridae
    - Infraorder Tapinocephalia
      - Brithopus (nomen dubium)
      - Deuterosaurus
      - ?Dimacrodon
      - ?Driveria
      - ?Mastersonia
      - Family Estemmenosuchidae
        - Estemmenosuchus
        - ?Molybdopygus
        - ?Parabradysaurus
      - Family Styracocephalidae
      - Family Tapinocephalidae
      - Family Titanosuchidae

=== Evolutionary history ===
Dinocephalians first appeared during the early Roadian as evidenced by remains found in Russia, but their geographic origin and early evolution like that of other therapsids in general is not clear. Dinocephalia considerably diversified throughout the Middle Permian, reaching an apex during the Capitanian stage at the end of the epoch, as exemplified by the Tapinocephalus Assemblage Zone in South Africa. Dinocephalians abruptly became extinct near the end of the Capitanian around 260 million years ago as part of the Capitanian mass extinction event, suggested to have been caused by the volcanic eruptions that formed the Emeishan Traps. The extinction is noted to have primarily affected large species, also notably including the similarly-sized bradysaurian pareiasaurs.

== See also ==
- Evolution of mammals
- List of Permian tetrapods
