= Koinia =

Koinia Temporal range: Late Permian

Scientific classification
- Domain: Eukaryota
- Kingdom: Animalia
- Phylum: Chordata
- Order: †Temnospondyli
- Family: †Archegosauridae
- Subfamily: †Melosaurinae
- Genus: †Koinia; Gubin, 1993

Type species
- †Koinia silantjevi Gubin, 1993

Extinct genus of amphibians

Koinia is an extinct genus of temnospondyl amphibian from the Late Permian of Russia. It is an archegosauroid in the subfamily Melosaurinae. Koinia was named in 1993 with the description of the type species K. silantjevi, based on fossils that were found in the Ocher Assemblage Zone, near the Vym River in the Komi Republic.

== Phylogeny ==
Below is a cladogram modified from Ruta et al. (2007) showing the relationship of Koinia to other archegosauroids:

- Archegosauroidea
  - - Sclerocephalus haeuseri
    - Syndyodosuchus tetricus
  - - - Cheliderpeton vrayni
      - - Cheliderpeton latirostre
        - Intasuchus silvicola
    - - Melosaurinae
        - - Konzhukovia vetusta
          - Tryphosuchus paucidens
        - - Koinia silantjevi
          - - Melosaurus uralensis
            - Uralosuchus tverdochlebovae
      - - Archegosaurus dyscriton
        - - Archegosaurus decheni
          - - - Collidosuchus tchudinovi
              - Kashmirosaurus ornatus
            - - Australerpeton cosgriffi
              - - Bashkirosaurus cherdyncevi
                - - Platyoposaurus stuckenbergi
                  - Prionosuchus plummeri
