= Uralosuchus =

Uralosuchus Temporal range: Late Permian

Scientific classification
- Domain: Eukaryota
- Kingdom: Animalia
- Phylum: Chordata
- Order: †Temnospondyli
- Family: †Archegosauridae
- Subfamily: †Melosaurinae
- Genus: †Uralosuchus; Gubin, 1993

Type species
- †Uralosuchus tverdochlebovae Gubin, 1993

Extinct genus of amphibians

Uralosuchus is an extinct genus of temnospondyl amphibian from the Late Permian of Russia, belonging to the group Archegosauroidea. It is a member of the archegosauroidean subfamily Melosaurinae. Fossils have been found in Orenburg Oblast. Uralosuchus was named in 1993 with the description of the type species U. tverdochlebovae.

== Phylogeny ==
Below is a cladogram modified from Ruta et al. (2007) showing the relationship of Uralosuchus to other archegosauroids:

- Archegosauroidea
  - - Sclerocephalus haeuseri
    - Syndyodosuchus tetricus
  - - - Cheliderpeton vrayni
      - - Cheliderpeton latirostre
        - Intasuchus silvicola
    - - Melosaurinae
        - - Konzhukovia vetusta
          - Tryphosuchus paucidens
        - - Koinia silantjevi
          - - Melosaurus uralensis
            - Uralosuchus tverdochlebovae
      - - Archegosaurus dyscriton
        - - Archegosaurus decheni
          - - - Collidosuchus tchudinovi
              - Kashmirosaurus ornatus
            - - Australerpeton cosgriffi
              - - Bashkirosaurus cherdyncevi
                - - Platyoposaurus stuckenbergi
                  - Prionosuchus plummeri
