= Kashmirosaurus =

Kashmirosaurus Temporal range: Late Carboniferous or Early Permian

Scientific classification
- Kingdom: Animalia
- Phylum: Chordata
- Clade: Tetrapoda
- Order: †Temnospondyli
- Family: †Archegosauridae
- Subfamily: †Melosaurinae
- Genus: †Kashmirosaurus; Werneburg and Schneider, 1996

Type species
- †Kashmirosaurus ornatus (Woodward, 1905 [originally Archegosaurus ornatus])

Synonyms
- Archegosaurus kashmiriensis Tewari, 1960

Extinct genus of amphibians

Kashmirosaurus is an extinct genus of temnospondyl amphibian known from Permo-Carboniferous deposits in the region of Jammu and Kashmir, India. It was originally named by English paleontologist Arthur Smith Woodward in 1905 as a species of Archegosaurus called Archegosaurus ornatus. More recently, the species has been recognized as being distinct from Archegosaurus, and it was placed in its own genus Kashmirosaurus in 1996. An additional species of Archegosaurus, A. kashmiriensis, was named in 1960 from the same deposits in Kashmir, and is now considered synonymous with Kashmirosaurus ornatus.

== Phylogeny ==
Below is a cladogram modified from Ruta et al. (2007) showing the relationship of Kashmirosaurus to other archegosauroids:

- Archegosauroidea
  - - Sclerocephalus haeuseri
    - Syndyodosuchus tetricus
  - - - Cheliderpeton vrayni
      - - Cheliderpeton latirostre
        - Intasuchus silvicola
    - - Melosaurinae
        - - Konzhukovia vetusta
          - Tryphosuchus paucidens
        - - Koinia silantjevi
          - - Melosaurus uralensis
            - Uralosuchus tverdochlebovae
      - - Archegosaurus dyscriton
        - - Archegosaurus decheni
          - - - Collidosuchus tchudinovi
              - Kashmirosaurus ornatus
            - - Australerpeton cosgriffi
              - - Bashkirosaurus cherdyncevi
                - - Platyoposaurus stuckenbergi
                  - Prionosuchus plummeri
