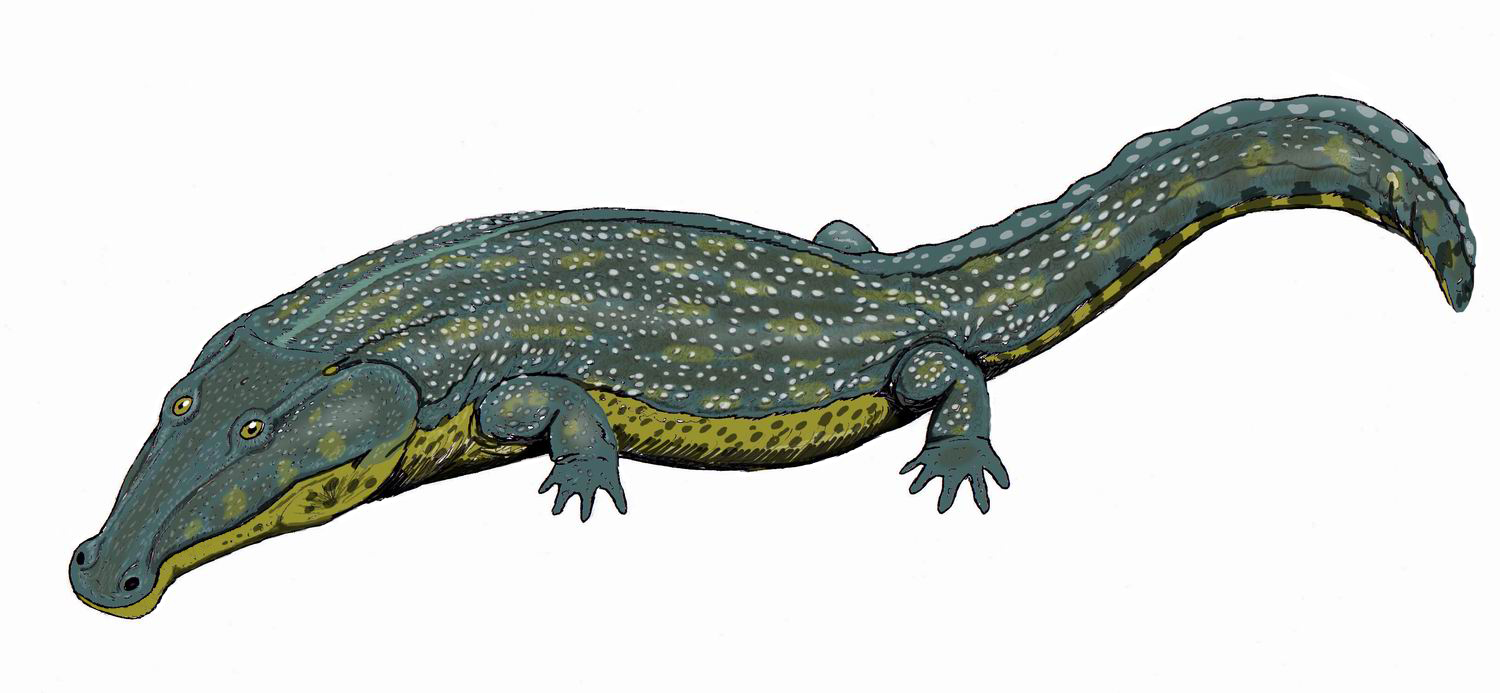
- Restoration of Melosaurus platyrhinus

Scientific classification
- Domain: Eukaryota
- Kingdom: Animalia
- Phylum: Chordata
- Order: †Temnospondyli
- Family: †Archegosauridae
- Subfamily: †Melosaurinae

Subgroups
- See text.

= Melosaurinae =

Melosaurinae Temporal range: Middle - Late Permian

Extinct subfamily of amphibians

Melosaurinae is an extinct subfamily of temnospondyl amphibians, part of the family Archegosauridae. Most melosaurines are known from Russia, although an unnamed species has been found in Brazil. Unlike the long-skulled archegosaurids of the family Platyoposaurinae, melosaurines have shorter, broadened snouts.

== Phylogeny ==
Below is a cladogram modified from Ruta et al. (2007):

- Archegosauroidea
  - - Sclerocephalus haeuseri
    - Syndyodosuchus tetricus
  - - - Cheliderpeton vrayni
      - - Cheliderpeton latirostre
        - Intasuchus silvicola
    - - Melosaurinae
        - - Konzhukovia vetusta
          - Tryphosuchus paucidens
        - - Koinia silantjevi
          - - Melosaurus uralensis
            - Uralosuchus tverdochlebovae
      - - Archegosaurus dyscriton
        - - Archegosaurus decheni
          - - - Collidosuchus tchudinovi
              - Kashmirosaurus ornatus
            - - Australerpeton cosgriffi
              - - Bashkirosaurus cherdyncevi
                - - Platyoposaurus stuckenbergi
                  - Prionosuchus plummeri
