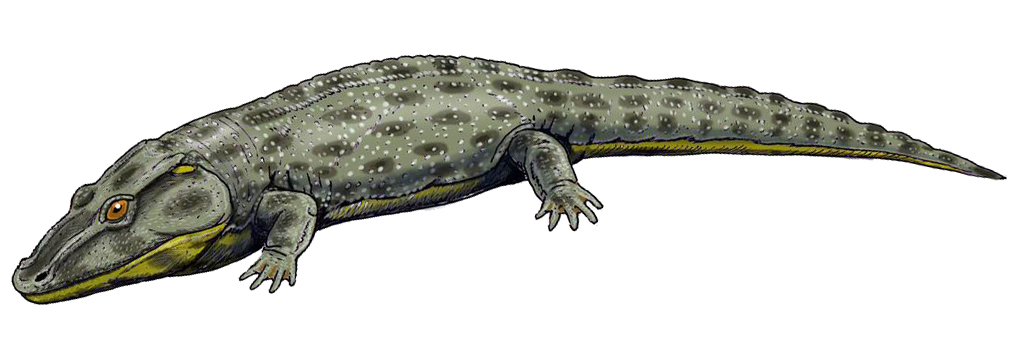

Scientific classification
- Domain: Eukaryota
- Kingdom: Animalia
- Phylum: Chordata
- Order: †Temnospondyli
- Superfamily: †Archegosauroidea (?)
- Family: †Intasuchidae; Konzhukova, 1956
- Genus: †Intasuchus; Konzhukova, 1956

Type species
- †Intasuchus silvicola Konzhukova, 1956

= Intasuchus =

Intasuchus Temporal range: Guadalupian, 272.5 Ma

Extinct genus of amphibians

Intasuchus is an extinct genus of temnospondyl amphibian from the Middle Permian of Russia. It is known from a single species, Intasuchus silvicola, which was named in 1956. Intasuchus belongs to the family Intasuchidae and is probably its sole member, although other taxa such as Syndyodosuchus and Cheliderpeton have been assigned to the family in the past. Intasuchus most likely belongs to the group Archegosauroidea, Permian relatives of the large, mostly Mesozoic temnospondyl clade Stereospondyli.

== Description ==
Intasuchus has a long, flattened skull that narrows slightly toward the front. Prominent ridges run along the skull surface from the eye sockets to the nostril openings. The otic notch at the back of the skull is relatively narrow in comparison to other temnospondyls, although it extends as a groove along the sides of the skull table. Intasuchus has large teeth on the roof of its mouth, with a large row between two openings of the palate called choanae, tusks on the palatine bones, and small teeth extending along the ectopterygoid.

== Classification ==
The phylogenetic analysis of Schoch and Milner (2000) placed Intasuchus as a basal member of a group called Archegosauriformes. It was placed among archegosauroids, although Archegosauroidea was found to be a paraphyletic assemblage of taxa basal to Stereospondyli. Intasuchus silvicola was recovered as the sister taxon of Cheliderpeton latirostre (now known as Glanochthon latirostre). Below is a cladogram from that analysis:

- Archegosauriformes
  - Sclerocephalus haeuseri
  - - - Cheliderpeton vrayni
      - - Cheliderpeton latirostre
        - Intasuchus silvicola
    - - - Archegosaurus dyscriton
        - - Archegosaurus decheni
          - - Collidosuchus tchudinovi
            - - Platyoposaurus stuckenbergi
              - Australerpeton cosgriffi
      - - Melosaurus uralensis
        - Konzhukovia vetusta
