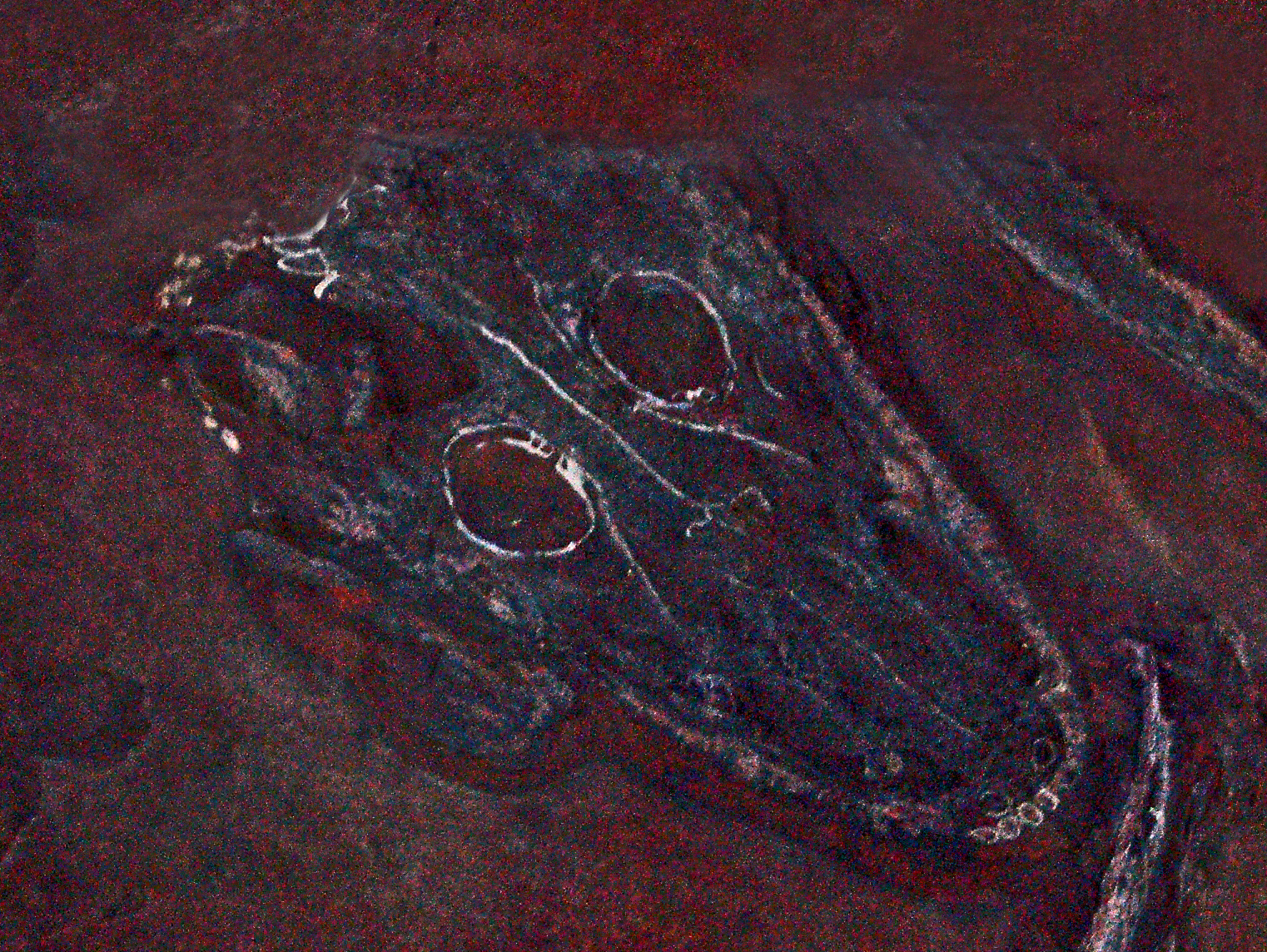
- Fossil skull of Cheliderpeton varyi from Broumov (Czech Republic) at the National Museum (Prague)

Scientific classification
- Kingdom: Animalia
- Phylum: Chordata
- Clade: Tetrapoda
- Order: †Temnospondyli
- Superfamily: †Archegosauroidea (?)
- Genus: †Cheliderpeton; Fritsch, 1877

Type species
- †Chelidosaurus vrayni Fritsch, 1877

= Cheliderpeton =

Cheliderpeton Temporal range: Early Permian

Extinct genus of amphibians

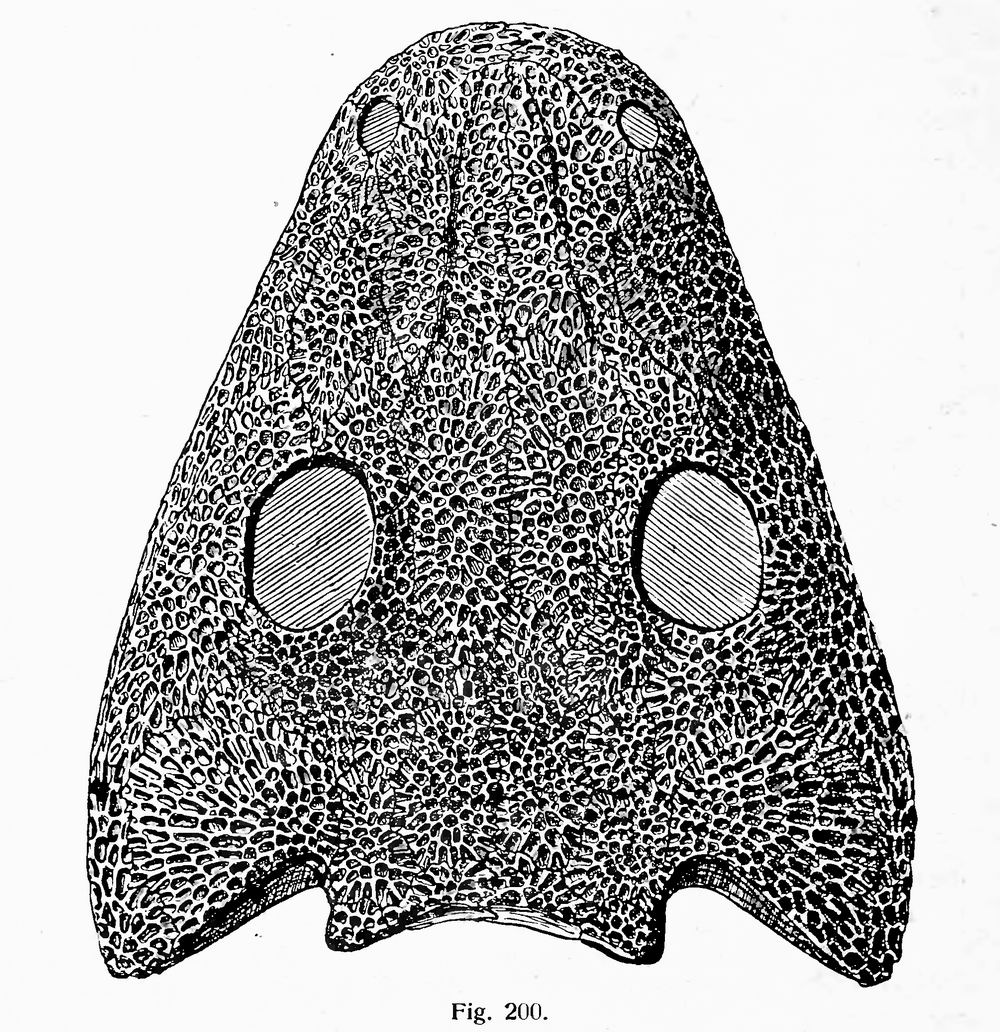
Skull of Cheliderpeton

Cheliderpeton (often misspelled Chelyderpeton) is an extinct genus of temnospondyl amphibian. It lived during the Early Permian in what is now Europe. Fossils have been found from the Ruprechtice horizon of the Intrasudetic Basin of Bohemia in the Czech Republic, as well as the Saar-Nahe Basin of southwestern Germany. Cheliderpeton had a 16 cm skull, and reached about 65 cm in length.

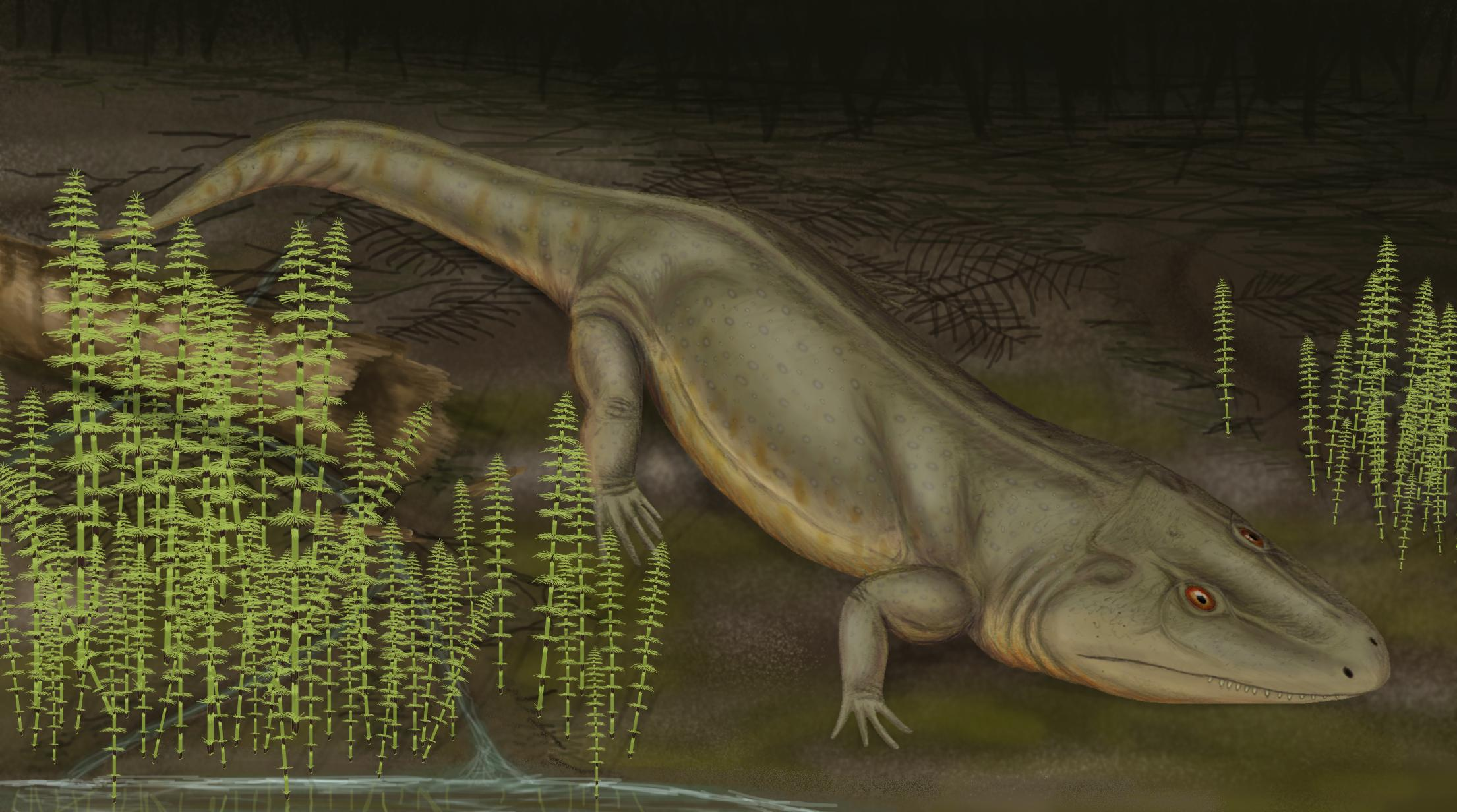
Life restoration of Cheliderpeton vranyi

The type species of Cheliderpeton is Chelidosaurus vranyi, named in 1877 by the Czech paleontologist Antonin Fritsch and found from the Czech Republic. The preoccupied generic name, referring to the trunk armour of turtles, was first changed into Chelydosaurus in 1885 and finally into Cheliderpeton in 1887. A second species named C. latirostre was described in 1993 by J. A. Boy from Germany, after having been assigned to Archegosaurus. It differs from the type in having a less extensive preorbital region of the skull, a wider cheek region, and a snout tip that is less round and has lateral projections. Currently the two species are the only ones known to belong to Cheliderpeton, although there have been more assigned in the past that are now considered to be synonymous with the known species. "Actinodon germanicus", described by O. Kuhn in 1939 on the basis of a specimen found from the Czech Republic, It is now known to be an unusually large individual of C. vranyi, probably in a late stage of ontogenic development.

It has been suggested that C. latirostre may belong to a separate genus, either to Archegosaurus or its own distinct taxon, due to several differences between it and the type species. These differences include the concave outline of the skull roof, the expanded snout seen in adult individuals (similar to Archegosaurus decheni), and a nasal-maxilla contact in the adult stage. In 2009, C. latirostre was placed in its own genus, Glanochthon.

Cheliderpeton is closely related to the genus Intasuchus from the northern pre-Ural region of Russia. Both share similarities in skull shape, as well as a short and expanded dorsal branch of the ilium and a premaxilla-maxilla suture that is anterior to the choana. Fossils of temnospondyls similar in appearance to Cheliderpeton have been found from the Autun Basin and the basin of Bourbon l'Archambault in France.

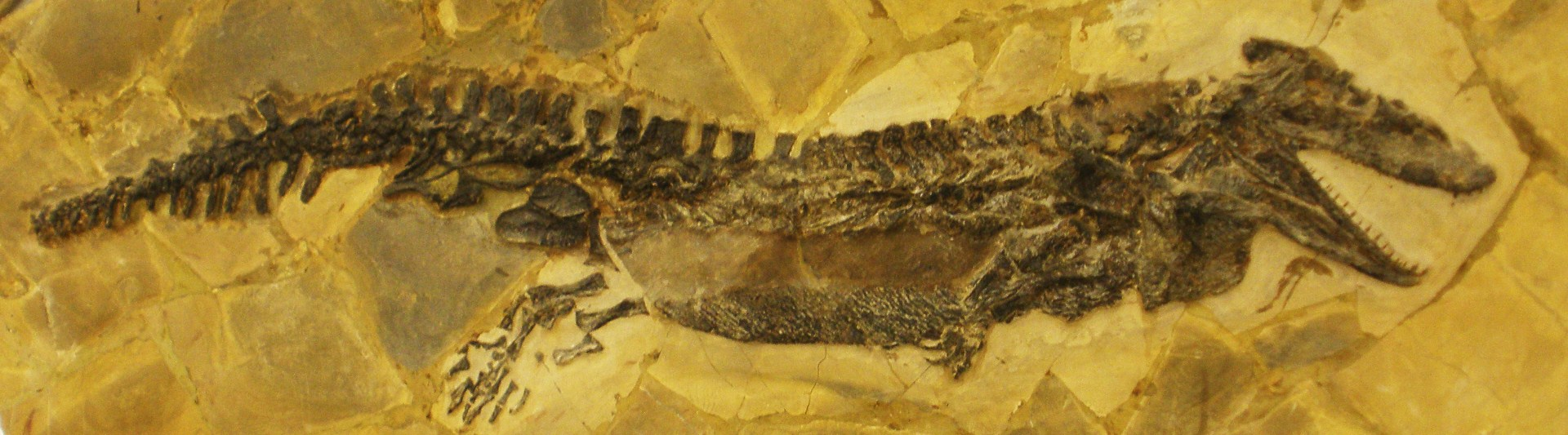
Fossil

Cheliderpeton may be a member of the family Archegosauridae or the family Intasuchidae. The family Archegosauridae belongs to the superfamily Archegosauroidea, but it is unsure whether Intasuchus, the type species of Intasuchidae, belongs to Archegosauroidea or the family Eryopidae, within the superfamily Eryopoidea. Thus it is unsure whether Cheliderpeton is an eryopoid (and perhaps more specifically an eryopid) or an archegosauroid. Cheliderpeton had previously been placed in the family Actinodontidae along with Actinodon, Syndyodosuchus and Sclerocephalus, but because Actinodon, the type genus of the family, is a junior synonym of the eryopid Onchiodon, the family is now considered polyphyletic.
