= Rio do Rasto Formation =

Geological formation in Brazil

- Stratigraphic range: Wordian to Wuchiapingian; ~266–254 Ma
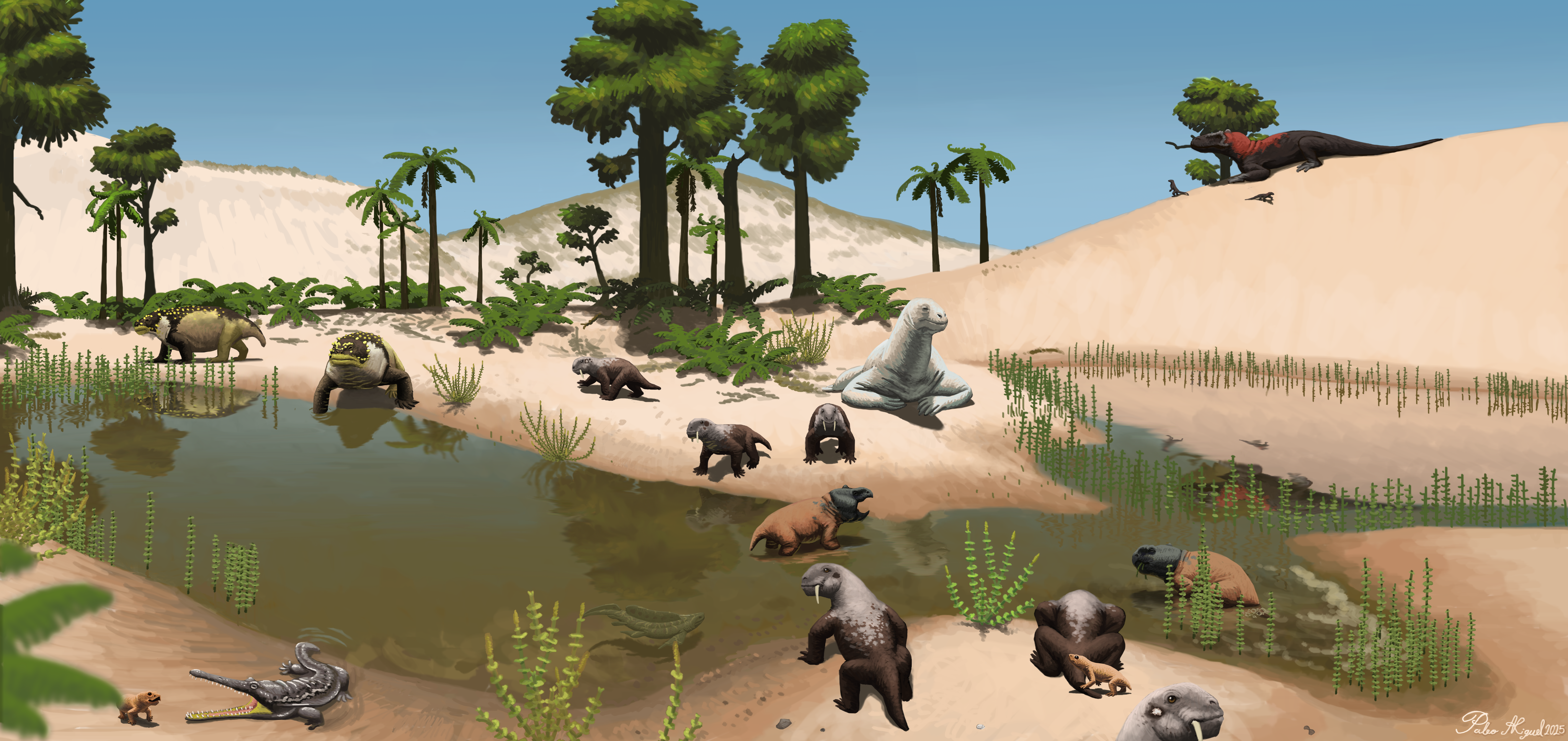
- Paleoartistic reconstruction of the Rio do Rasto Fm. fauna
- Type: Geological formation
- Unit of: Paraná and Pelotas Basins
- Sub-units: Morro Pelado Mb., Serrinha Mb.
- Underlies: Pirambóia Formation (Paraná Basin); Botucatu Formation (Pelotas Basin)
- Overlies: Teresina Formation

Lithology
- Primary: Shale, sandstone

Location
- Coordinates: 28°24′26″S 49°32′46″W
- Approximate paleocoordinates: 41.3°S 22.4°W
- Region: Paraná, Santa Catarina, Rio Grande do Sul
- Country: Brazil
- Extent: Paraná Basin
- Rio do Rasto Formation (Brazil)

The Rio do Rasto Formation is a Late Permian sedimentary geological formation in the South Region of Brazil. The official name is Rio do Rasto, although in some publications it appears as Rio do Rastro.

The strata were deposited between the Wordian and the Wuchiapingian, from about 266 to 254 million years ago. The geology, alongside its paleobiota, indicate that the locality was a freshwater environment. Some of the animals discovered in the formation include Tiarajudens, Parapytanga and Pampaphoneus.

== Description ==
=== Geology ===
The Rio do Rasto Formation is found mainly in the Brazilian states of Santa Catarina, Paraná, and Rio Grande do Sul. It was formed during the Late Permian and is divided into two members: the lower Serrinha Member and the upper Morro Pelado Member, spanning from the Wordian to Wuchiapingian stages of the Permian. The deposits of the Formation are mainly continental, having lacustrine, fluvial and aeolian sediment deposition.

Although there have been many interpretations of the Serrinha Member, most agree on it being a shallow lacustrine environment. Hypotheses about the Member's formation range from deposits in lacustrine and deltaic environments with large lakes influenced by storm waves to it being a deposit of shallow lakes occasionally influenced by fluvial incursions and storm waves. The member is 150–250 metres (490–820 ft) thick and it is composed chiefly of mudstone and fine-grained sandstone.

The Morro Pelado Member was deposited in smaller lakes, alluvial plains, fluvial meanders, delta systems and temporary bodies of water. The rock deposits of Morro Pelado were covered by aeolian stones, such as the dunes of the Pirambóia Formation. It is 250–300 metres (820–980 ft) thick and mainly composed of fine to medium-grained reddish sandstones, usually stratified, with fossils being found on its pelitic intercalations. Tetrapod fossils only occur in this Member.

The transition between the two Members occurs in the center-east portion of the Paraná Basin.

=== Age ===
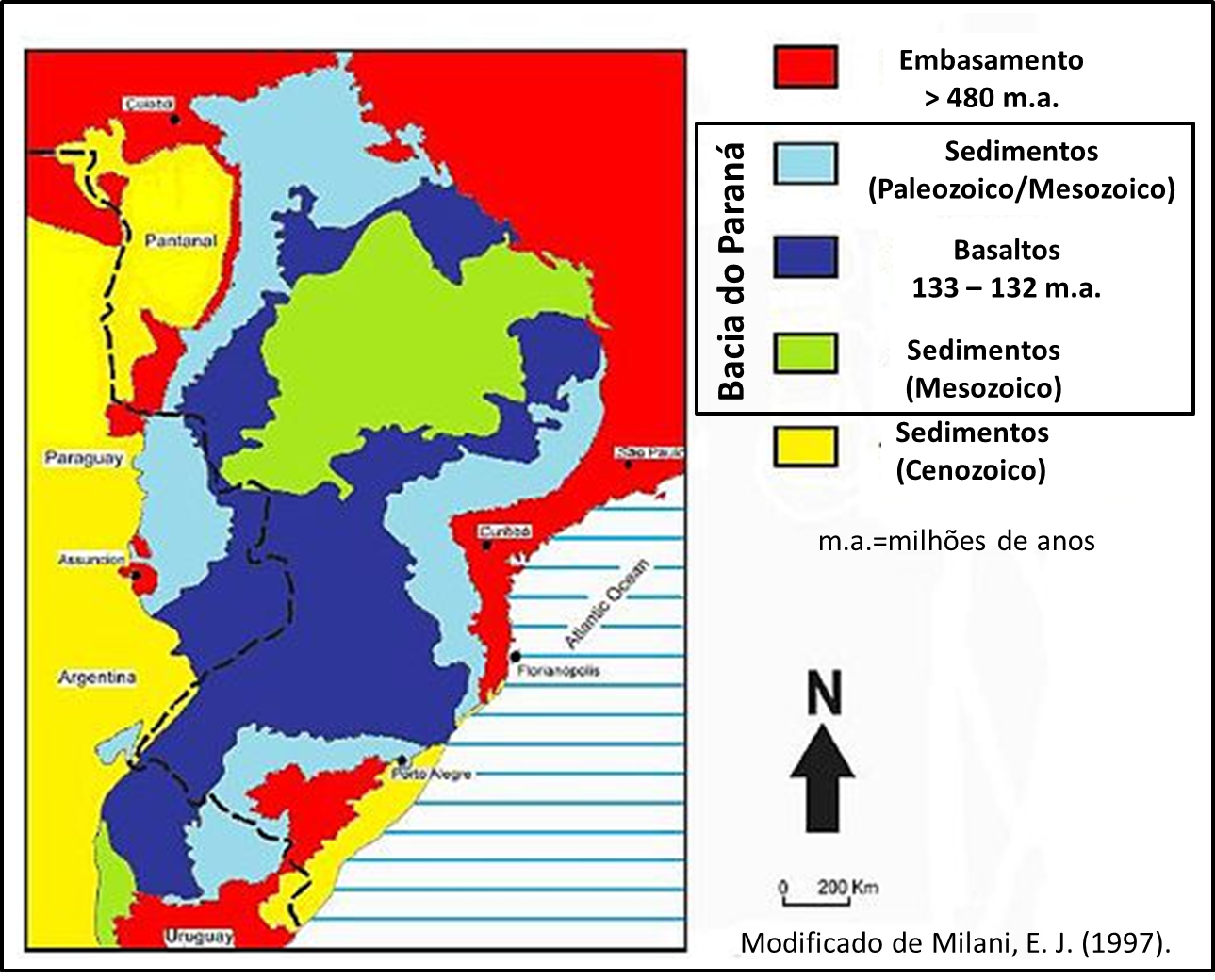
Extent of Paleozoic (including the Rio do Rasto Formation) and Mesozoic units in the Paraná Basin in light blue

Estimating the age of the Rio do Rasto formation has long relied solely on the basis of biostratigraphic correlations. Since 2018, radiometric dating has made it possible to specify the age of part of the formation. Based on conchostracan and bivalve faunas, Holz and colleagues have suggested that the sedimentary succession of this formation extended from the Wordian (middle Guadalupian) to the Wuchiapingian (base of the Lopingian). Among the tetrapods, the presence of dinocephalians in Fagundes and Boqueirão sites (State of Rio Grande do Sul) as well as in the region of Serra do Cadeado (State of Paraná) indicates a Guadalupian age for these localities, given that this synapsid group is restricted to this age in the rest of the world. In the Fagundes farm site, dinocephalians coexist with the pareiasaur Provelosaurus. The latter is present in the Aceguà area about 2 m above a 30 cm thick layer of bentonite radiometrically dated at 266 ± 5.4 million years. The broad error margin of this radiometric dating places the Brazilian dinocephalian sites in the Lower Roadian – Middle Capitanian time interval, confirming the Guadalupian age of this part of the Morro Pelado Member. The other tetrapods of the Morro Pelado Member in Rio Grande do Sul suggest an age not exceeding Wordian: Tapinocephalids are only known from Wordian and Capitanian rocks, the basal anomodont Tiarajudens is closely related to the South African genus Anomocephalus of the Tapinocephalus Assemblage Zone whose age extends from the late Wordian to the late Capitanian, and the temnospondyl Konzhukovia, present at the Boqueirão farm site in São Gabriel, is also known in eastern European Russia in strata limited to the Wordian-Capitanian interval. The probable Wordian age of the Morro Pelado Member is also reinforced by a radiometric age of the Serrinha Member (lower part of the Rio do Rasto formation) obtained from a volcanic ash layer which gave an age of 270.61 + 1.76/− 3.27 Ma corresponding to the Roadian (early Guadalupian).

=== Paleoecology ===
The rock deposits of the Serrinha and Morro Pelado Members, as well as the abundant conchostracan fossils, indicate a freshwater environment, with Serrinha being composed of shallow lakes with occasional storms and Morro Pelado being composed of small lakes, alluvial plains, meanders and temporary bodies of water, which were later covered up by dunes. The increased occurrence of aeolian sandstone in Morro Pelado indicate a drier climate with greater aridity. Fossils of the Rio do Rasto Formation, and neighboring Permian formations, have revealed a flora composed of plants like glossopterids, sphenophytes and pteridophytes. The fauna is composed of Invertebrates, such as bivalves, gastropods and conchostracans, and vertebrates like palaeonisciform and elasmobranch fish such as Xenacanthus and Sphenacanthus. Tetrapods are only found in the upper Morro Pelado Member, and are represented by terrestrial herbivores like the dicynodonts Endothiodon and Rastodon, the pareiasaur Provelosaurus, a tapinocephalid and the saber-toothed Tiarajudens. Therapsid predators such as Pampaphoneus were also present, as well as another unidentified anteosaur, and a titanosuchid. Temnospondyls such as Australerpeton, Bageherpeton and Rastosuchus lurked in the abundant bodies of water. These giant amphibians filled the niche of aquatic predators, much like the modern day crocodiles.

Coprolite remains have also been found, some of which likely belong to palaeonisciform and elasmobranch fish, and some of the coprolites contained pieces of bones and scales, demonstrating clear evidence of predation. Some of the scales preserved peg-and-socket structures, associated with palaeonisciform fish. In at least one coprolite it was possible to recognise a fish jaw with teeth.

Stromatolites have also been found in the formation, interpreted as having developed in waters that were shallow, clear and warm and in habitats that were inhospitable for competitors.

== Fossil content ==
=== Flora ===
Genus	Species	Locality	Stratigraphic position	Matrials	Description	Image
Dichophyllites	D. sp.					
Dizeugotheca	D. bortoluzzii					
Dizeugotheca	D. sp.					
Glossopteris	G. aff. angustifolia				A genus of seed fern.	
Glossopteris	G. decipiens				A genus of seed fern.	
Glossopteris	G. dorizonensis				A genus of seed fern.	
Glossopteris	G. cf. formosa				A genus of seed fern.	
Glossopteris	G. grafi				A genus of seed fern.	
Glossopteris	G. cf. indica				A genus of seed fern.	
Glossopteris	G. aff. longicaulis				A genus of seed fern.	
Glossopteris	G. margiondulata				A genus of seed fern.	
Glossopteris	G. riorastensis				A genus of seed fern.	
Glossopteris	G. singenervis				A genus of seed fern.	
Glossopteris	G. spathulato-emarginata				A genus of seed fern.	
Glossopteris	G. aff. stricta				A genus of seed fern.	
Glossopteris	G. sp.				A genus of seed fern.	
Glossopteris	G. cf. surangei				A genus of seed fern.	
Glossopteris	G. cf. taeniopteroides				A genus of seed fern.	
Ilexoidephyllum	I. permicum					
Schizoneura	S. gondwanensis					
Sphenopteris	S. sp.				A genus of seed fern.	
Sphenophyllum	S. paranaense S. cf. thonii				A genus of fern.	
Paracalamites	P. sp.					
Pecopteris	P. bracatingaensis				A genus of fern.	
Pecopteris	P. cadeadensis				A genus of fern.	
Pecopteris	P. dolianitii				A genus of fern.	
Pecopteris	P. esperancensis				A genus of fern.	
Pecopteris	P. sp.				A genus of fern.	
Vertebraria	V. sp.					

=== Invertebrates ===
==== Bivalves ====
Genus	Species	Locality	Stratigraphic position	Materials	Description	Image
Cowperesia	C. emerita					
Cowperesia	C. cf. Terraria sp.					
Leinzia	L. similis					
Nothoterraria	N. acarinata					
Oliveiraia	O. pristina					
Palaeomutela	P. platinensis					
Relogiicola	R. delicata.					
Terraia	T. altissima					

==== Conchostraca ====
Genus	Species	Locality	Stratigraphic position	Materials	Description	Image
Asmussia	A. regularis					
Asmussia	A. sp.					
Cyzicus	C. sp.					
Gabonestheria	G. sp.					
Monoleaia	M. unicostata micropolygonata					
Monoleaia	M. unicostata timboensis					
Palaeolimnadiopsis	P. subalata					
Palaeolimnadia	P. sp.					
Paranaleaia	P. supina					

==== Gastropods ====
Genus	Species	Locality	Stratigraphic position	Materials	Description	Image
Dendropupa	D. sp.		Serrinha Member		A land snail. According to Rohn (1988), the specimens found in the formation rarely reach more than 5mm of height.	
Hydrobia						

=== Vertebrates ===
==== Fish ====
Genus	Species	Locality	Stratigraphic position	Materials	Description	Image
Acrolepis					A bony fish, known from fossil scales.	
Actinopterygii indet.	Species A, B and C				Specimens cannot be ascribed to any species.	
Coelacanthidae indet.			Serrinha Member		Coelacanth is known from fossil scales.	
Elonichthys	cf. E. gondwanus		Serrinha Member		A Palaeoniscid, fish known from fossil scales.	
Sphenacanthus	S. riorastoensis		Serrinha Member		A sphenacanthid shark.	
Paranaichthys	P. longianalis		Serrinha Member		A ray-finned fish.	
Rubidus	R. pascoalensis				A ray-finned fish.	
Triodus	T. richterae		Morro Pelado Member		A xenacanthid shark, known from fossil teeth.	
Xenacanthus	X. ragonhai		Serrinha Member		A xenacanthid shark, known from fossil teeth.	

==== Amphibians ====
Genus	Species	Locality	Stratigraphic position	Materials	Description	Image
Australerpeton	A. cosgriffi		Morro Pelado Member		A temnospondyl.	
Bageherpeton	B. longignathus		Morro Pelado Member	A lower jaw	A temnospondyl.	
Konzhukovia	K. sangabrielensis		Morro Pelado Member		A temnospondyl.	
"Otacillus"	"O. aumondi"		Morro Pelado Member		A temnosponsyl. Only described in preprint.	
Rastosuchus	R. hammeri		Morro Pelado Member		A temnospondyl.	
Parapytanga	P. catarinensis		Morro Pelado Member		A temnospondyl.	
Temnospondyl indet.			Morro Pelado Member		A temnospondyl. Due to the fragmentary nature of the fossil and the absence of a skull, identification was impossible.	
Melosaurinae indet.			Posto Queimado Locality		A temnospondyl.	

==== Parareptiles ====
Genus	Species	Locality	Stratigraphic position	Materials	Description	Image
Provelosaurus	P. americanus	Posto Queimado	Morro Pelado Member	A left partial cranium including a portion of the snout with maxillary teeth, orbit, most of thetemporal region and the quadrate	A pareiasaur reptile.	

==== Synapsids ====
Genus	Species	Locality	Stratigraphic position	Materials	Description	Image
Rastodon	R. procurvidens		Morro Pelado Member		A dicynodont.	
Endothiodon	E. sp.		Morro Pelado Member		A dicynodont.	
Tapinocephalidae indet.			Morro Pelado Member		A tapinocephalid.	
Tiarajudens	T. eccentricus		Morro Pelado Member		An anomocephaloid.	
Pampaphoneus	P. biccai		Morro Pelado Member		An anteosaur.	
Anteosauria indet.			Morro Pelado Member		An anteosaur.	
Titanosuchidae indet.			Morro Pelado Member		A titanosuchid.	
Diictodon indet.	D. sp		Posto Queimado Locality		An dicynodont.	
Anteosauria indet.			Posto Queimado Locality		An anteosaur.	

== See also ==
- List of dinosaur-bearing rock formations
- Fremouw Formation
- Irati Formation
- Rio Bonito Formation
