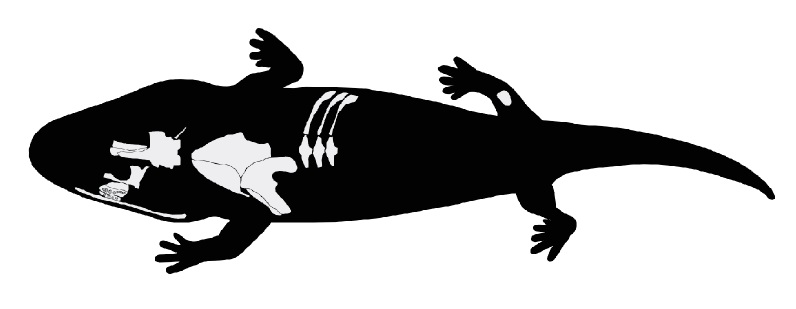

Scientific classification
- Kingdom: Animalia
- Phylum: Chordata
- Clade: Tetrapoda
- Order: †Temnospondyli
- Suborder: †Stereospondyli
- Family: †Rhinesuchidae (?)
- Genus: †Parapytanga; Strapasson et al., 2015
- Species: †P. catarinensis

Binomial name
- †Parapytanga catarinensis Strapasson et al., 2015

= Parapytanga =

Parapytanga Temporal range: Middle–Late Permian 272.5–254.0 Ma

Extinct genus of temnospondyls

Parapytanga is an extinct monotypic genus of temnospondyl, the type species being Parapytanga catarinensis. Parapytanga probably belongs to the family Rhinesuchidae. Fossils have been found in the late Permian Rio do Rasto Formation of Brazil.

== History of study ==
The holotype and only known specimen (UFRGS-PV-0355-P) of P. catarinensis was collected in the early 1980s from an outcrop of the Rio do Rasto Formation in Santa Catarina State by a team led by Mário C. Barberena. The type locality is along the BR 116 highway. The generic epithet is derived from the Tupi language term parapytanga, or 'red river,' for the color of the matrix and the fluvial-lacustrine environment of the Rio do Rasto Formation. The species epithet refers to Santa Catarina State.

== Anatomy ==
The holotype represents a partial skeleton with small portions of the skull, a right hemimandible, some rib and vertebral material, some pectoral girdle elements, a right femur, and scales. It is diagnosed by a combination of features, including (1) a robust epipterygoid with an elongate blade-like process; (2) a broad sutural contact between the parasphenoid and the pterygoid; (3) elongated muscular pockets on the parasphenoid that are restricted anterolaterally by prominent and sharp muscular crests that extend upwards over the lateral sides of the exoccipitals; (4) a small basioccipital ossification, only visible in occipital view where it contributes to the exoccipital condyles; (5) a shagreen of denticles on the parasphenoid and the pterygoids; and (6) foramina for the carotid arteries that are positioned at the posterolateral corner of the parasphenoid, posterior to the pterygoid articulation.

== Phylogenetic relationships ==
Parapytanga was originally described as a non-stereospondyl stereospondylomorph, with a phylogenetic analysis based on the matrix of Schoch (2013) recovering it as the sister taxon to the rhinesuchid Australerpeton and this pairing as the sister taxon to Stereospondyli. However, Strapasson et al. (2014) noted that this result may have been due to a high proportion of missing data, as Parapytanga shares many features with rhinesuchids. Subsequent studies have consistently placed Australerpeton within Stereospondyli as a rhinesuchid, rather than as a closer relative of archegosaurid stereospondylomorph; Parapytanga is rarely included in phylogenetic analyses due to its incompleteness, but a study by Eltink et al. (2019) recovered it near the base of Rhinesuchidae.
