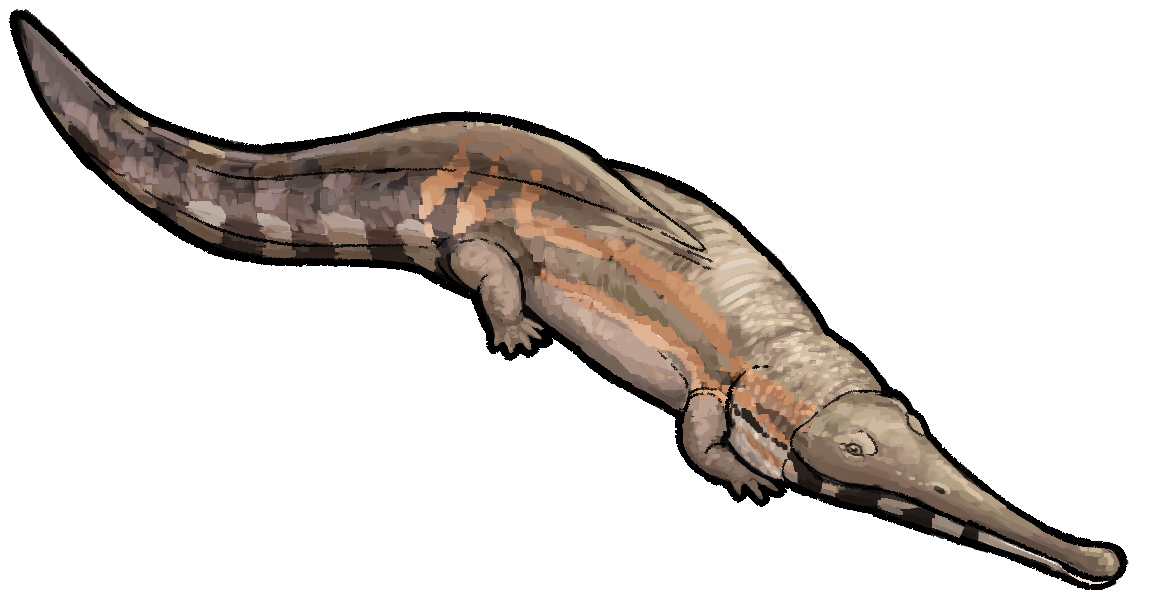
- Life Restoration

Scientific classification
- Domain: Eukaryota
- Kingdom: Animalia
- Phylum: Chordata
- Order: †Temnospondyli
- Family: †Archegosauridae
- Genus: †Bageherpeton; Dias-da-Silva & Barberena, 2001.

Type species
- †B. longignathus Dias-da-Silva & Barberena, 2001

= Bageherpeton =

Bageherpeton Temporal range: Upper Permian

Extinct genus of amphibians

Bageherpeton is an extinct genus of archegosaurid temnospondyl amphibian from the Upper Permian period of Rio Grande do Sul, Brazil (Paleorrota). It was found in the Rio do Rasto Formation, and was named in honor of the city of Bagé near where it was found. It was described from a lower jaw.
