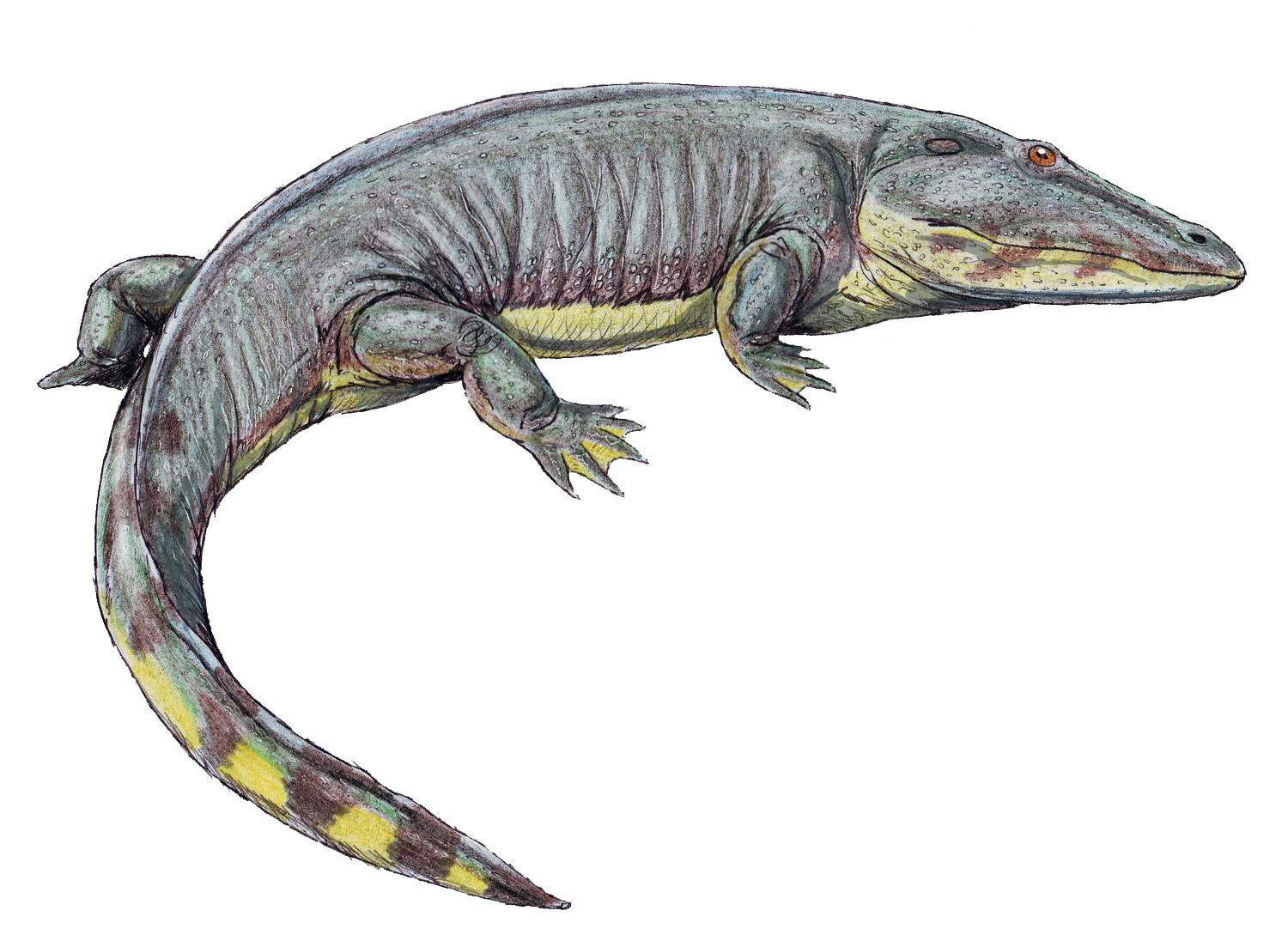
- Image of Actinodon frossardi

Scientific classification
- Kingdom: Animalia
- Phylum: Chordata
- Order: †Temnospondyli
- Superfamily: †Archegosauroidea
- Family: †Actinodontidae; Lydekker, 1885

Genera
- †Chelydosaurus: †Chelydosaurus marahomensis; †Chelydosaurus vranii; †Syndyodosuchus: †Syndyodosuchus tetricus

= Actinodontidae =

Actinodontidae Temporal range: Early Permian-Late Permian 290–259 Ma

Actinodontidae is an extinct family of temnospondyls that lived during the Permian period. The family is a sister taxon to Archegosauridae, under the superfamily Archegosauroidea.Though air-breathing via lungs, they would have been more physiologically similar to fishes than present amphibians or tetrapods; living primarily in brackish or freshwater environments.

== Sources ==
- Lohmann, Ulla; Sachs, Sven (2001). "Observations on the postcranial morphology, ontogeny and palaeobiology of Sclerocephalus haeuseri (Amphibia: Actinodontidae) from the Lower Permian of Southwest Germany" (PDF). Memoirs of the Queensland Museum. Brisbane: Queensland Museum.
