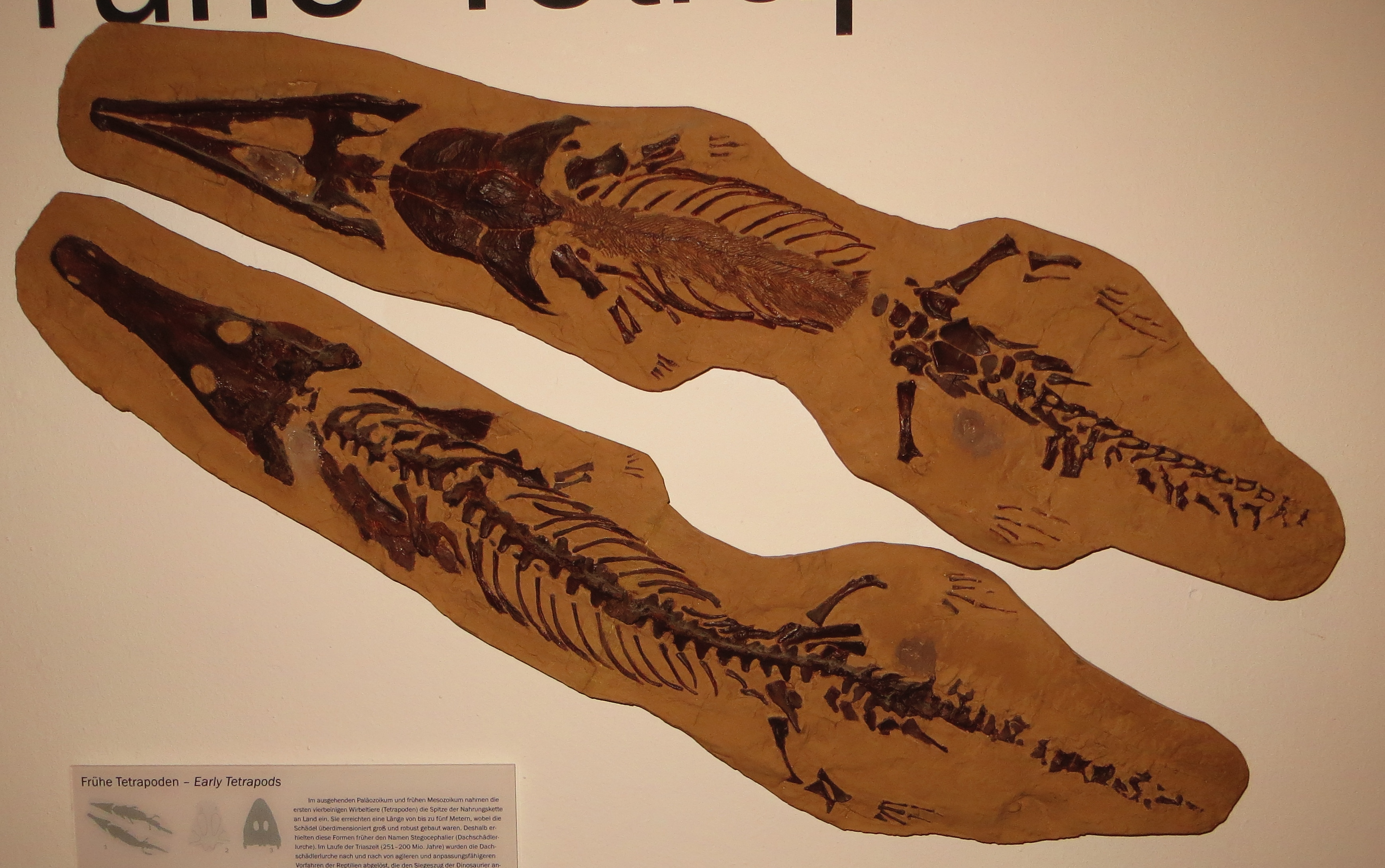
- Archegosaurus decheni fossil at the paleontological collection of the Museum of the University of Tübingen

Scientific classification
- Domain: Eukaryota
- Kingdom: Animalia
- Phylum: Chordata
- Order: †Temnospondyli
- Superfamily: †Archegosauroidea
- Family: †Archegosauridae; Lydekker, 1885

Genera
- Platyoposaurinae: Archegosaurus; Bageherpeton; Bashkirosaurus; Collidosuchus; Kashmirosaurus; Platyoposaurus; Prionosuchus; Melosaurinae: Koinia; Konzhukovia; Melosaurus; Tryphosuchus; Uralosuchus

= Archegosauridae =

Archegosauridae Temporal range: Early Permian-Late Permian 297–252 Ma

Extinct family of temnospondyls

Archegosauridae is a family of relatively large and long snouted temnospondyls that lived in the Permian period. They were fully aquatic animals, and were metabolically and physiologically more similar to fish than modern amphibians. The family has been divided into two subfamilies, the longer-snouted Platyoposaurinae and the shorter-snouted Melosaurinae.

== Gallery ==
=== Platyoposaurinae ===
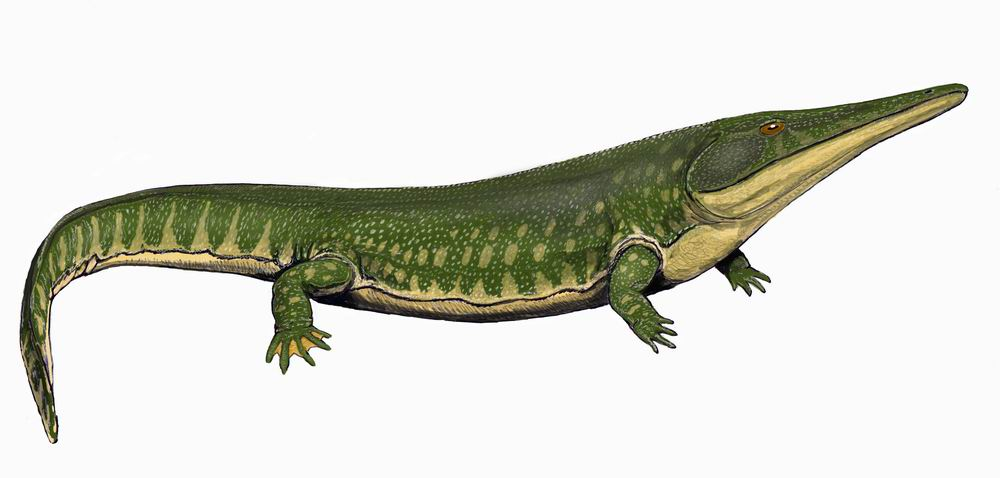
Archegosaurus decheni, of the early Permian of Germany

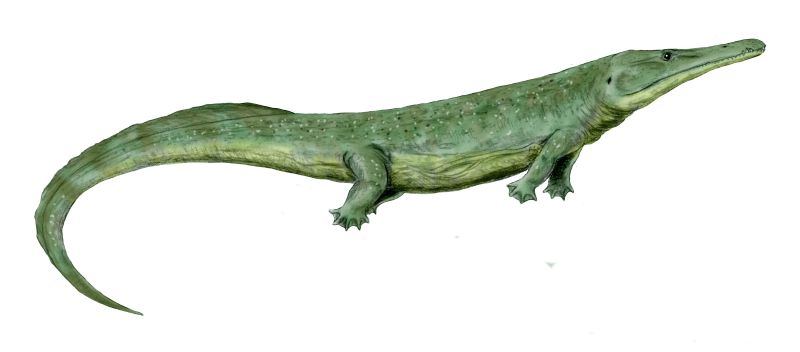
Prionosuchus plummeri, of the early Permian of Brazil

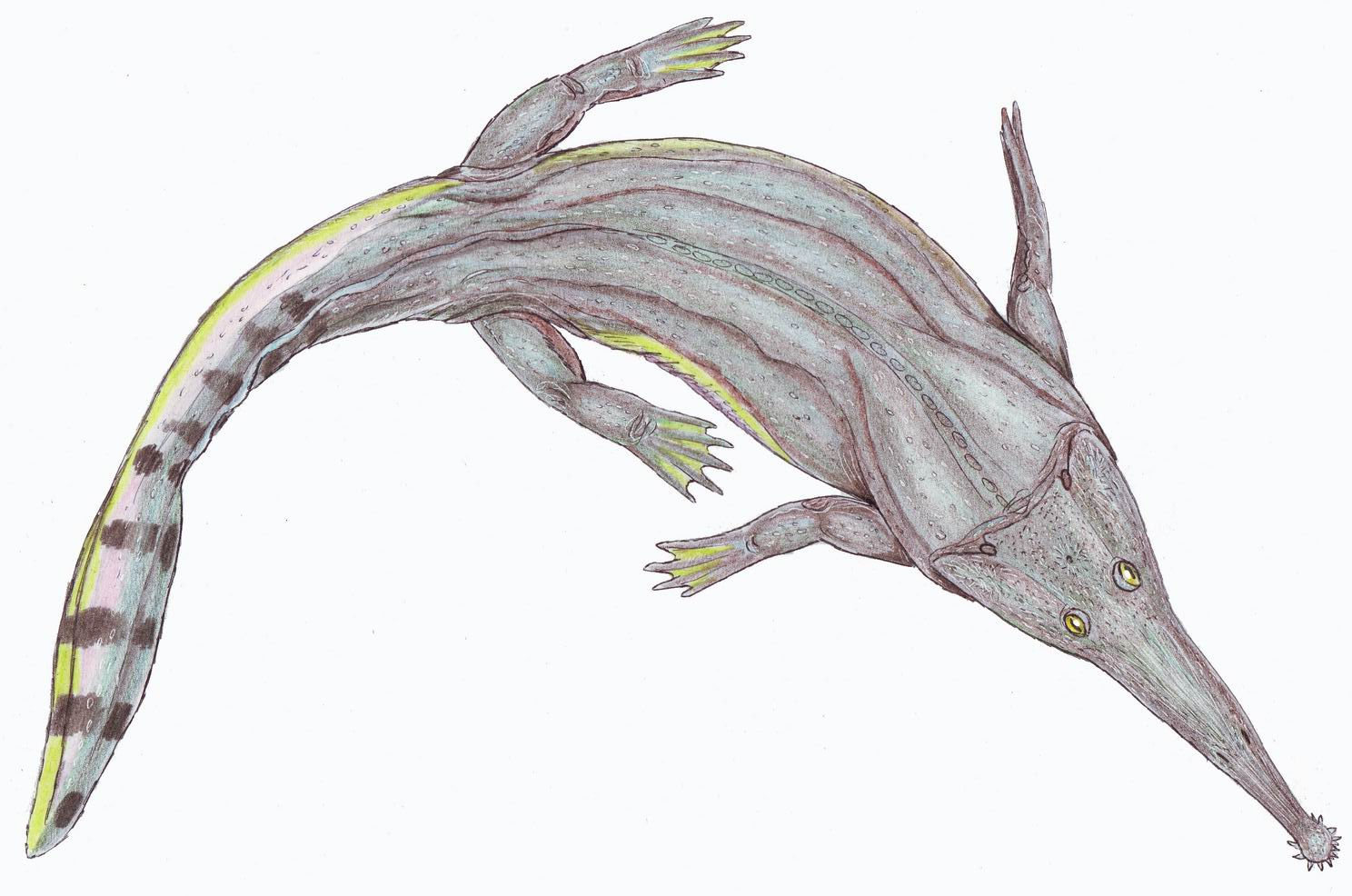
Platyoposaurus watsoni, of the early to middle Permian of Russia

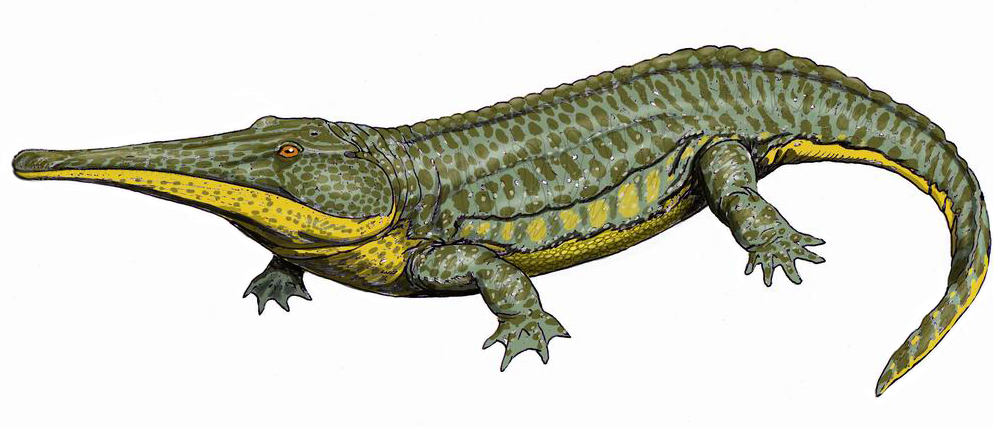
Platyoposaurus stuckenbergi, of the middle Permian of Russia

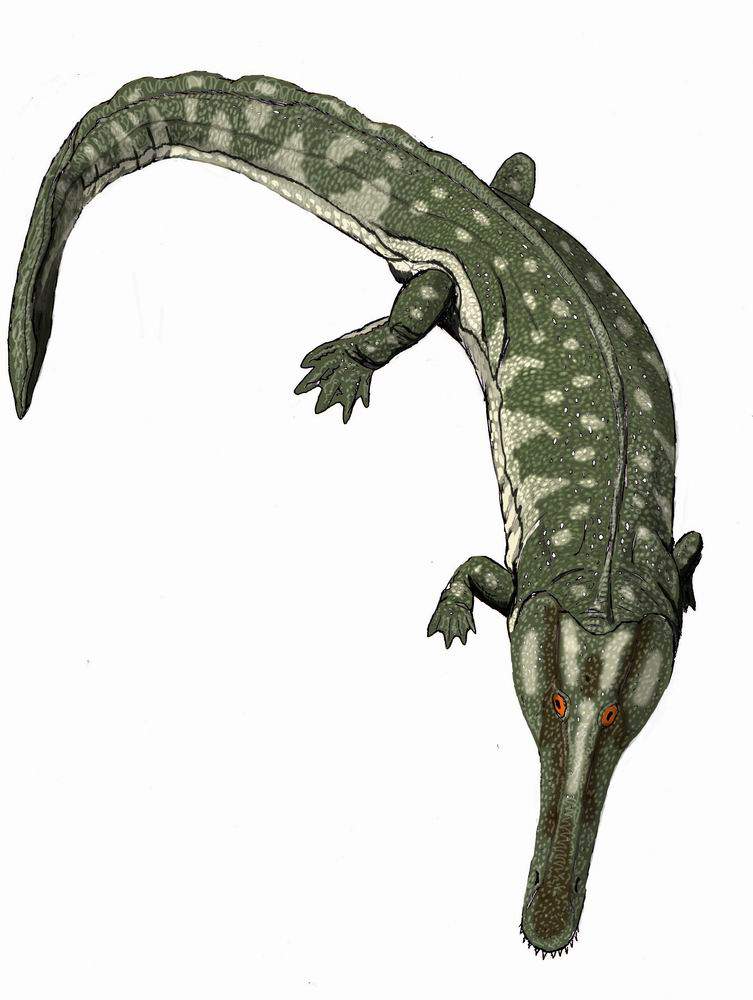
Collidosuchus tchudinovi, of the middle Permian of Russia

=== Melosaurinae ===
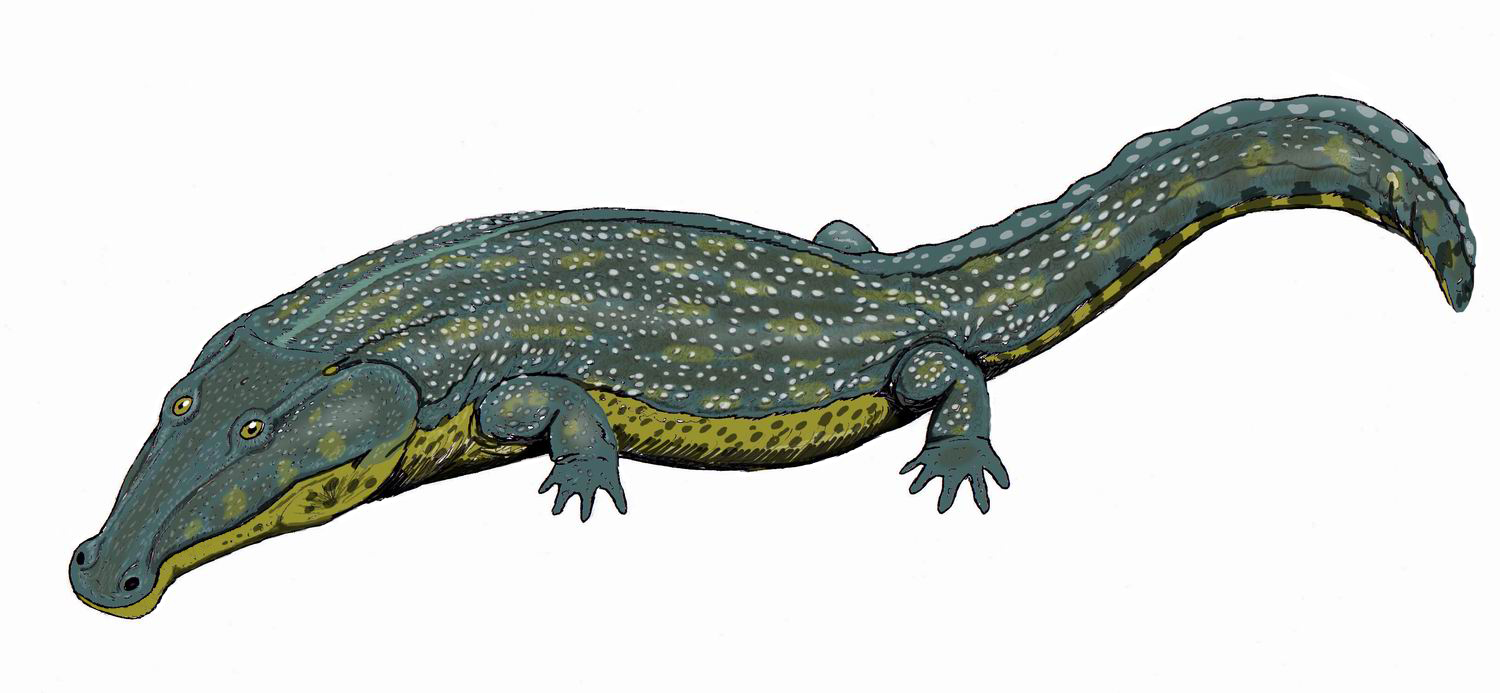
Melosaurus platyrhinus, of the early to middle Permian of Russia

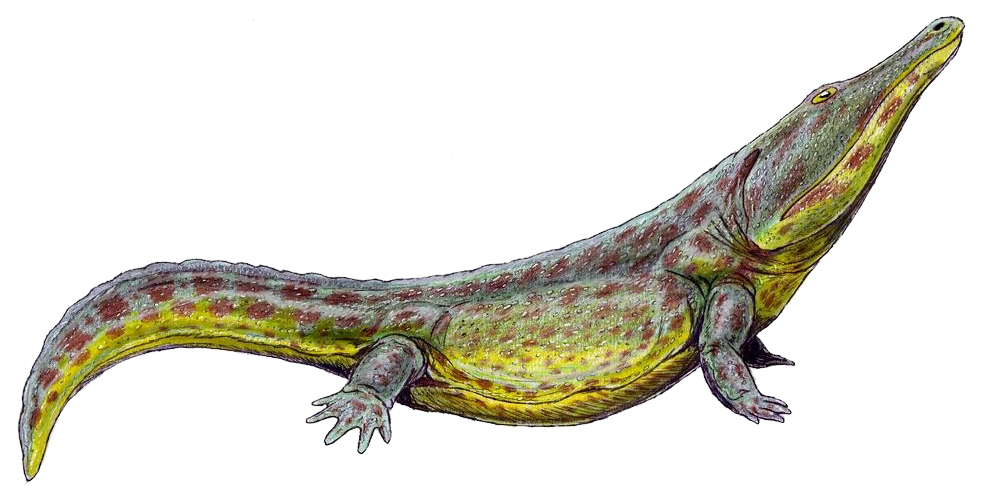
Konzhukovia vetusta, of the middle to late Permian of Russia

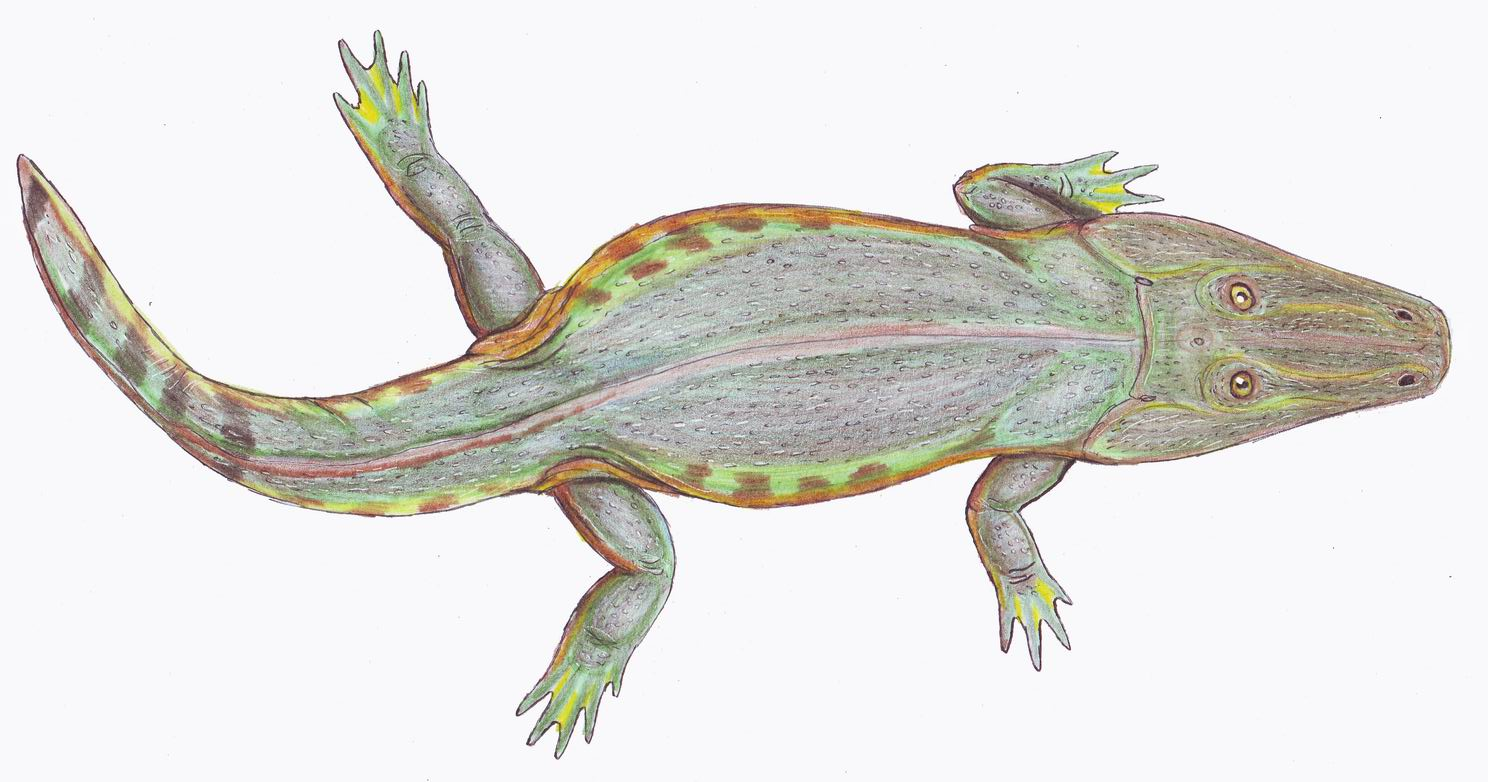
Tryphosuchus, of the middle to late Permian of Russia
