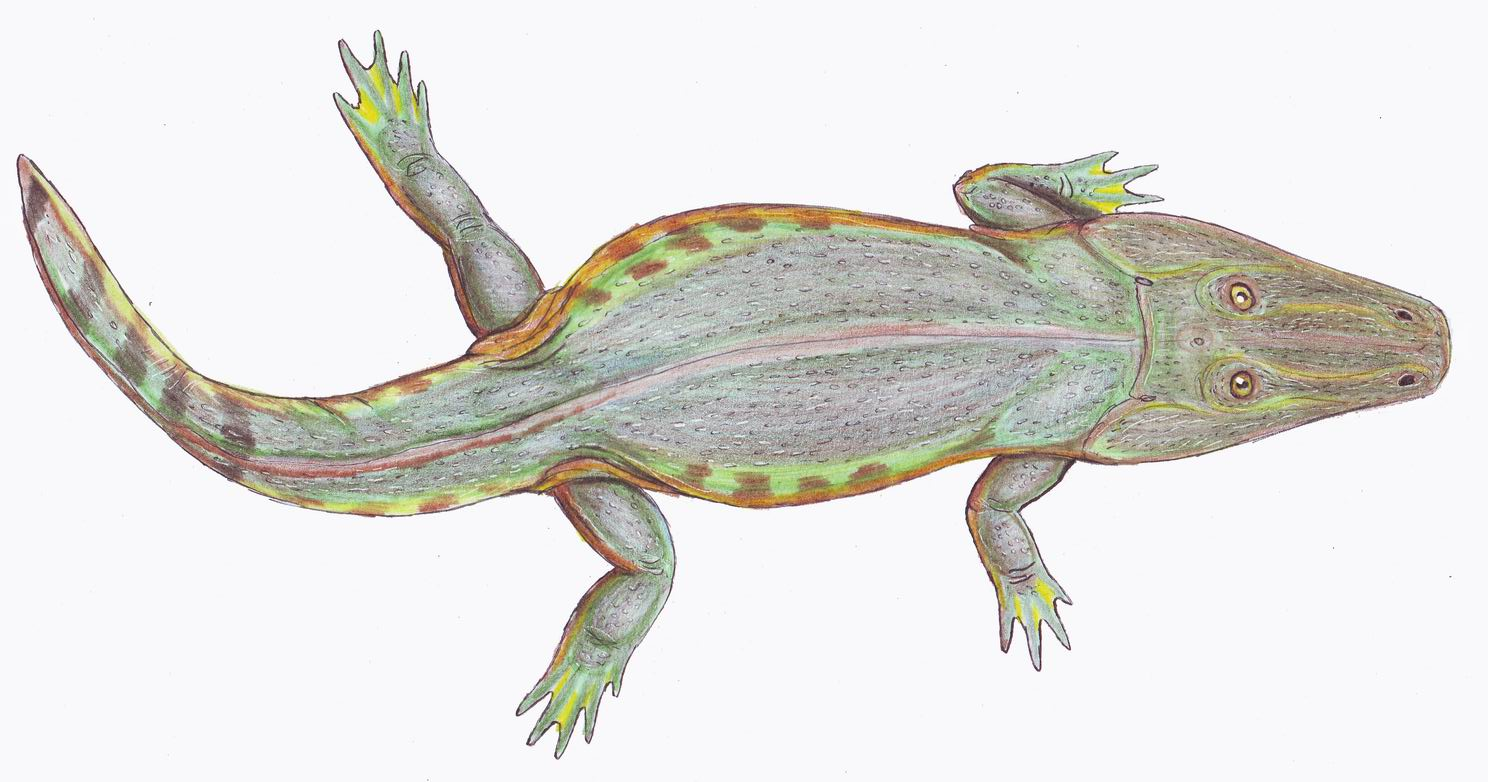

Scientific classification
- Domain: Eukaryota
- Kingdom: Animalia
- Phylum: Chordata
- Order: †Temnospondyli
- Family: †Archegosauridae
- Subfamily: †Melosaurinae
- Genus: †Tryphosuchus; Konzhukova, 1955

Type species
- Melosaurus kinelensis

= Tryphosuchus =

Tryphosuchus Temporal range: Permian, 268.0–265.0 Ma

Extinct genus of amphibians

Tryphosuchus is an extinct genus of temnospondyl amphibian known from the Isheevo Assemblage Zone and Amanakskaya Formation, European Russia.
