= Bashkirosaurus =

Scientific classification
- Kingdom: Animalia
- Phylum: Chordata
- Clade: Tetrapoda
- Order: †Temnospondyli
- Family: †Archegosauridae
- Genus: †Bashkirosaurus; Gubin, 1981

Species
- B. tcherdyncevi Gubin, 1981 (type)

Extinct genus of amphibians

Bashkirosaurus is an extinct genus of archegosauroidean temnospondyl within the family Archegosauridae. Locality: Belebei locality, Belebeiskii District, Bashkortostan (Bashkiry) Province, Western Cisuraly, European Russia.

== See also ==
- Prehistoric amphibian
- List of prehistoric amphibians
