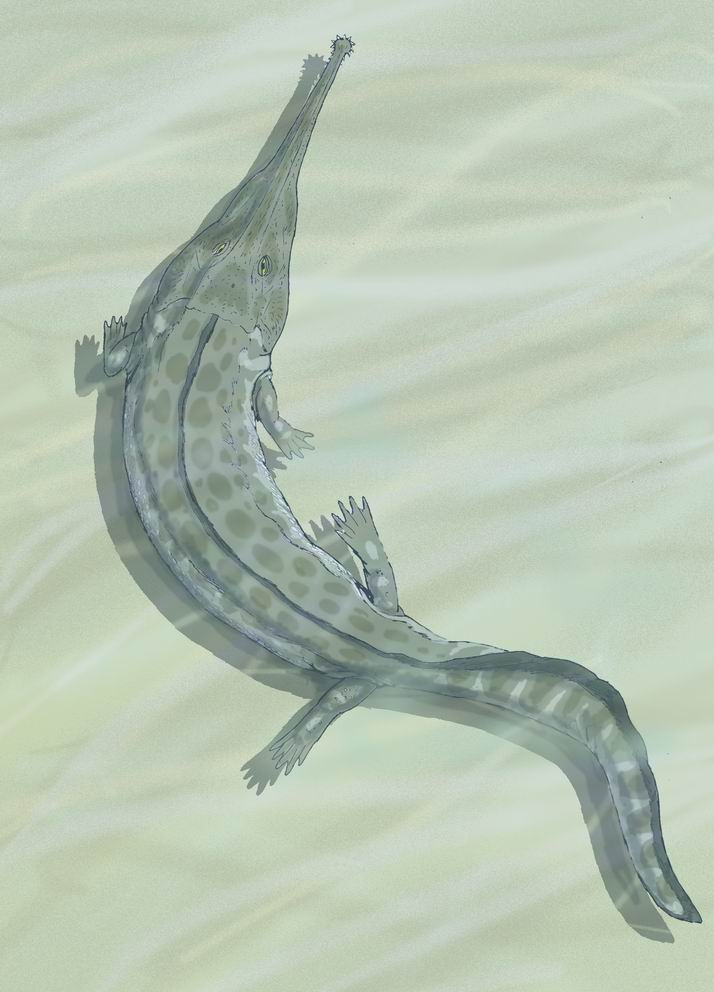
- Prionosuchus

Scientific classification
- Kingdom: Animalia
- Phylum: Chordata
- Clade: Tetrapoda
- Order: †Temnospondyli
- Clade: †Stereospondylomorpha
- Superfamily: †Archegosauroidea; Lydekker, 1885

Families
- Actinodontidae; Archegosauridae; Sclerocephalidae; ?Intasuchidae

= Archegosauroidea =

Archegosauroids Temporal range: Pennsylvanian to Late Permian, 301–251.902 Ma

Extinct superfamily of amphibians

Archegosauroidea is an extinct superfamily of Permian temnospondyls. The superfamily is assigned to the clade Stereospondylomorpha and is the sister taxon to the suborder Stereospondyli. It includes the families Actinodontidae and Archegosauridae, and possibly the genus Intasuchus, which is placed within the monotypic family Intasuchidae. They were fully aquatic animals, and were metabolically and physiologically more similar to fish than modern amphibians.

== Gallery ==
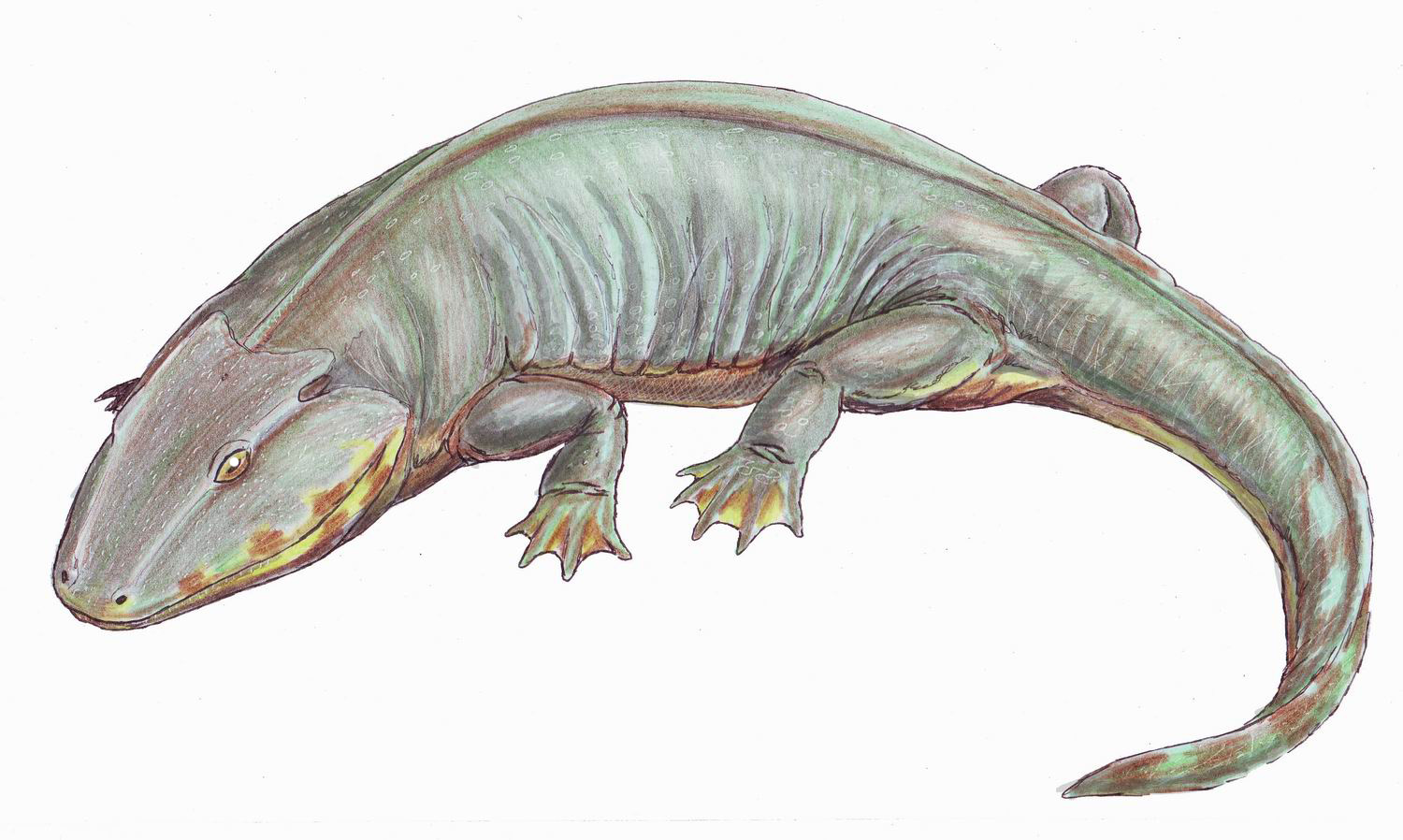
Sclerocephalus hauseri, of the early Permian of Germany

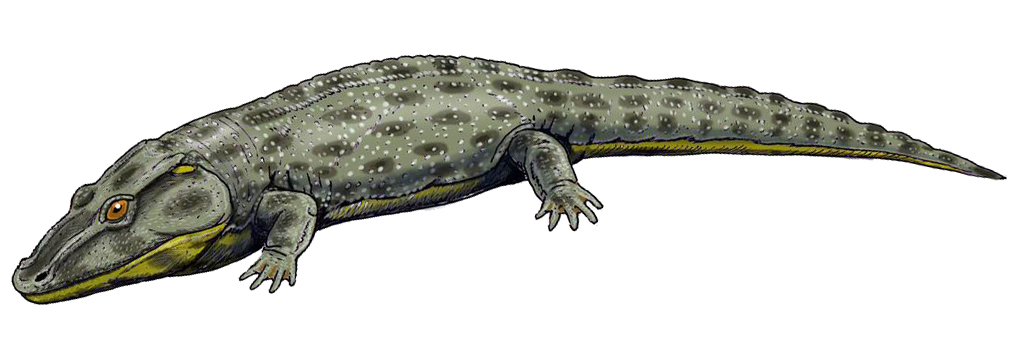
Intasuchus silvicola, of the early Permian of Russia

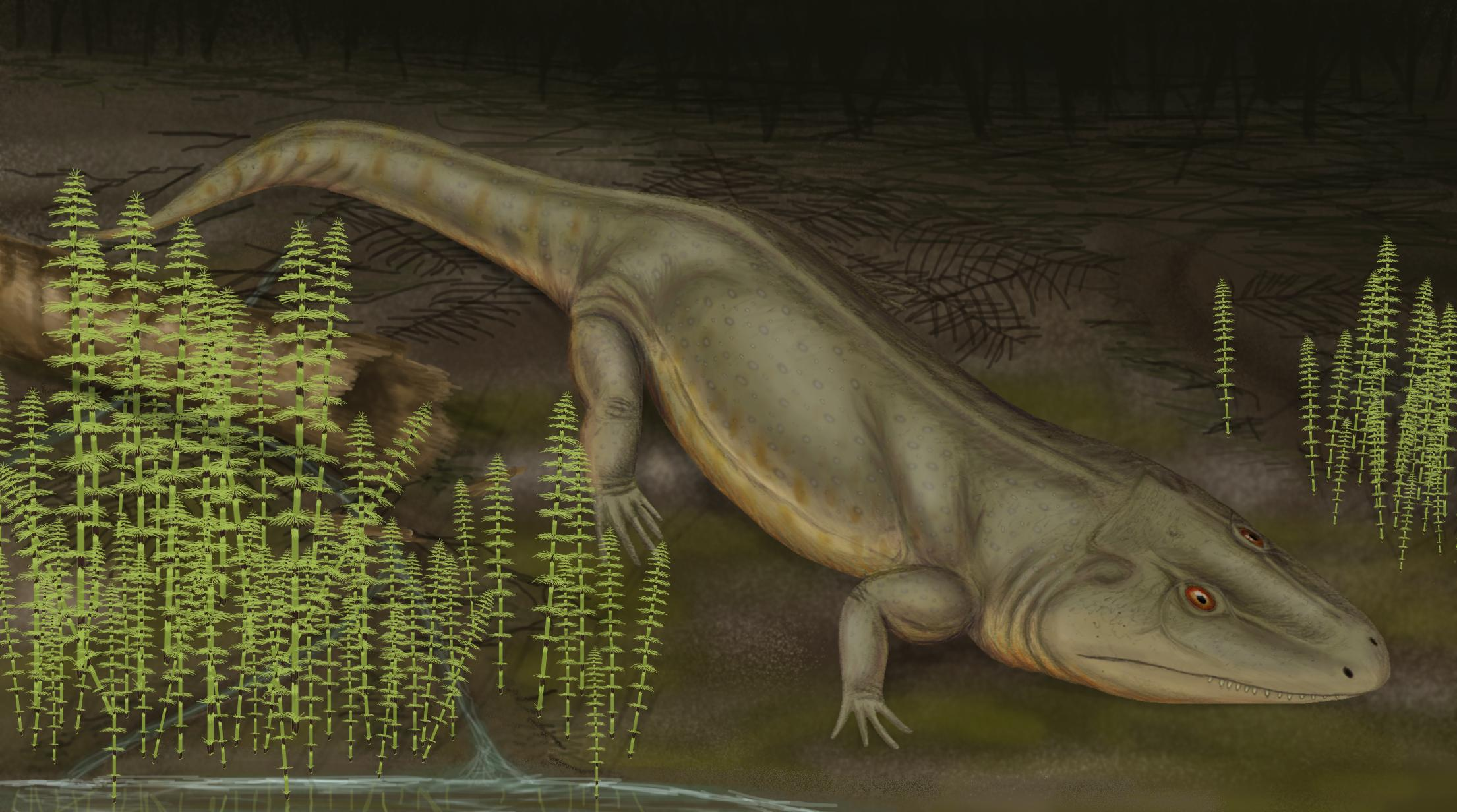
Cheliderpeton vranyi, of the early Permian of the Czech Republic

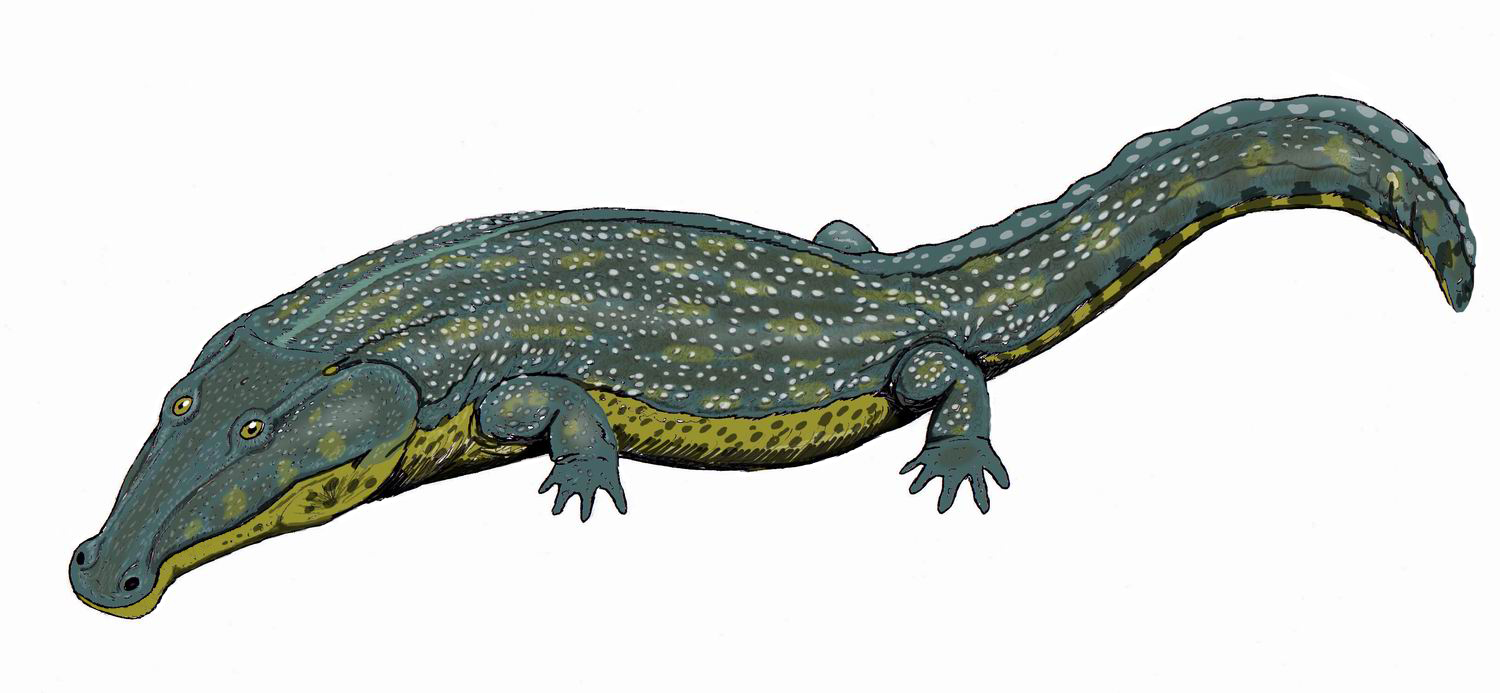
Melosaurus platyrhinus, a melosaurine archegosaurid of the early to middle Permian of Russia

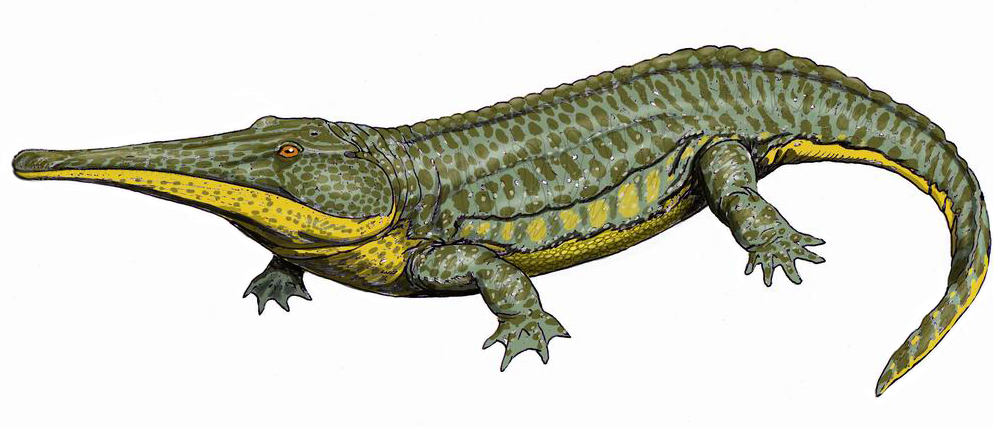
Platyoposaurus stuckenbergi, a platyoposaurine archegosaurid of the middle Permian of Russia
