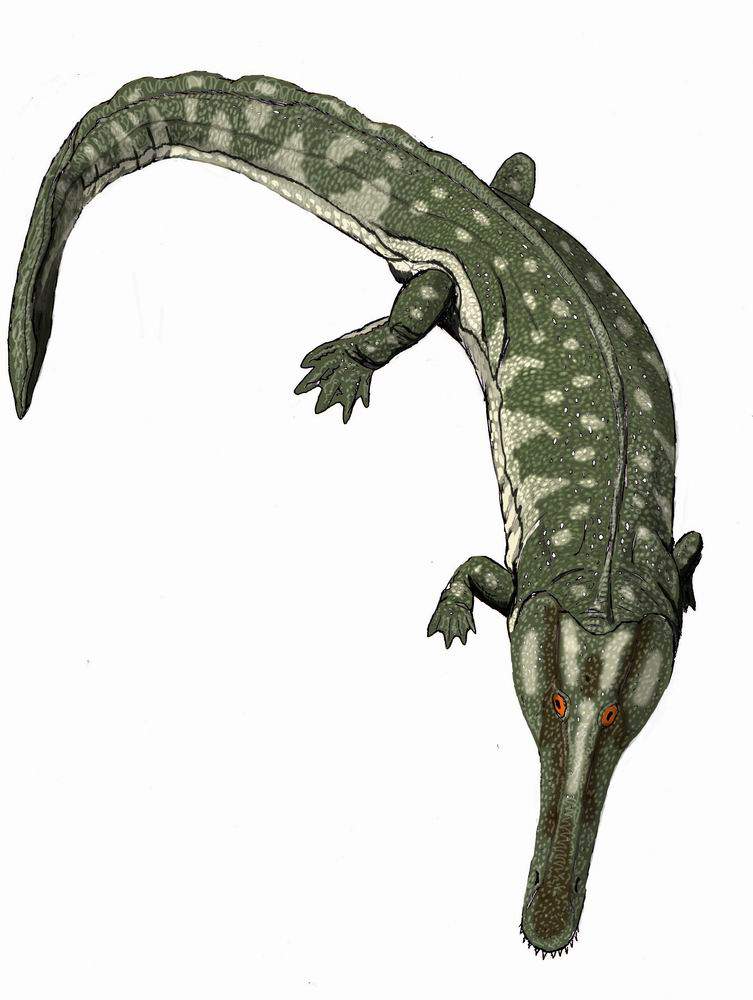

Scientific classification
- Kingdom: Animalia
- Phylum: Chordata
- Clade: Tetrapoda
- Order: †Temnospondyli
- Family: †Archegosauridae
- Genus: †Collidosuchus; Gubin, 1986

Species
- C. tchudinovi Gubin, 1986 (type)

= Collidosuchus =

Collidosuchus Temporal range: Roadian–Wordian

Extinct genus of amphibians

Collidosuchus is an extinct genus of archegosauroidean temnospondyl within the family Archegosauridae. It lived during the Permian period, approximately 268 to 265 million years ago in what is now Russia.
