= Glanochthon =

Glanochthon Temporal range: Early Permian

Scientific classification
- Kingdom: Animalia
- Phylum: Chordata
- Clade: Tetrapoda
- Order: †Temnospondyli
- Superfamily: †Archegosauroidea
- Genus: †Glanochthon; Schoch and Witzmann, 2009

Species
- †G. latirostre (Jordan, 1849); †G. angusta Schoch and Witzmann, 2009

Extinct genus of amphibians

Glanochthon is an extinct genus of temnospondyl amphibian from the Early Permian of Germany. Fossils have been found from the Meisenheim Formation in the Saar–Nahe Basin.
