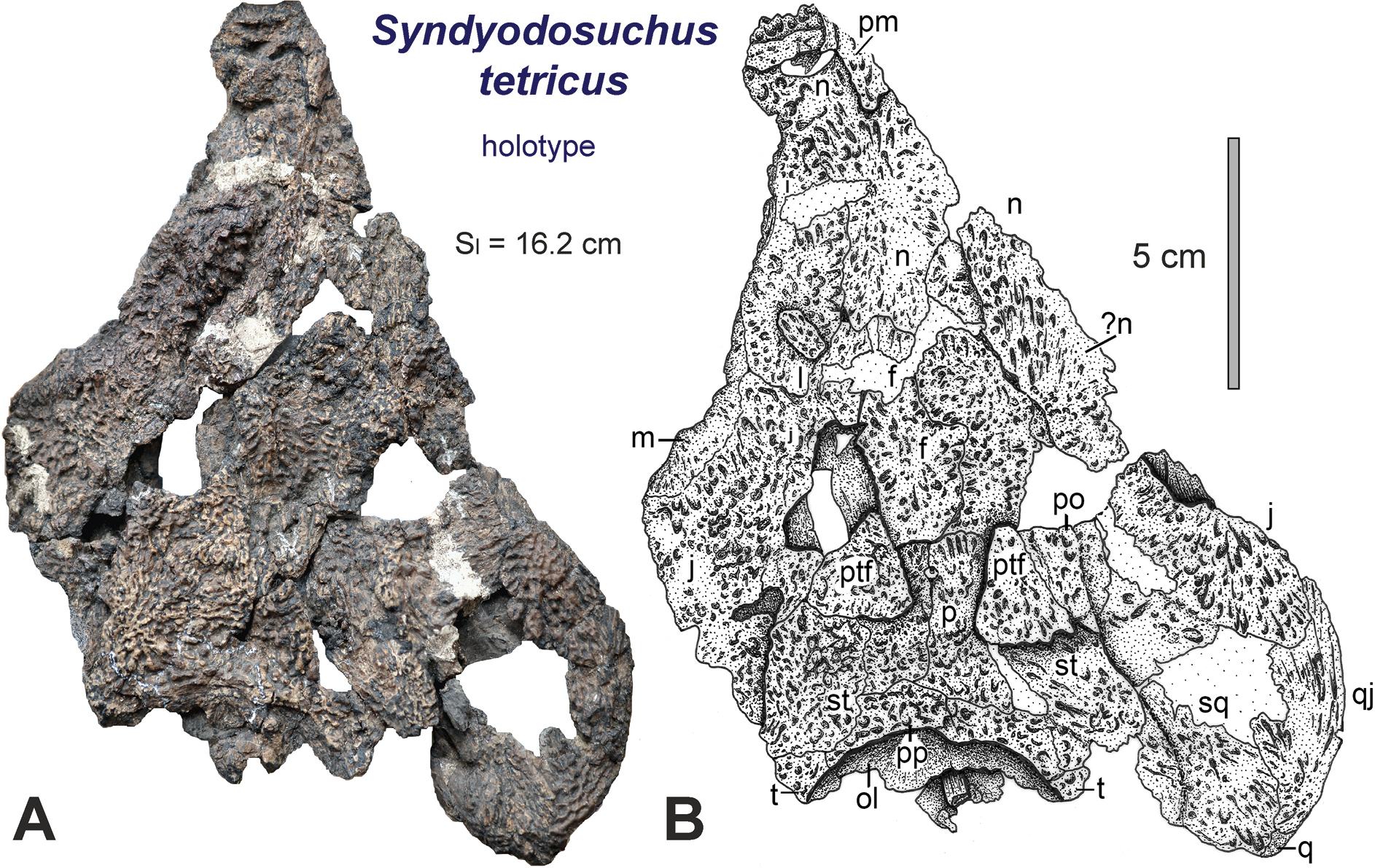
- Holotype

Scientific classification
- Kingdom: Animalia
- Phylum: Chordata
- Clade: Tetrapoda
- Order: †Temnospondyli
- Family: †Actinodontidae
- Genus: †Syndyodosuchus; Konzhukova, 1956

Type species
- Syndyodosuchus tetricus Konzhukova, 1956

= Syndyodosuchus =

Syndyodosuchus Temporal range: Permian, 279.5–272.5 Ma

Extinct genus of amphibians

Syndyodosuchus is an extinct genus of temnospondyl within the family Actinodontidae. It is known from the Permian Inta Formation of European Russia.
