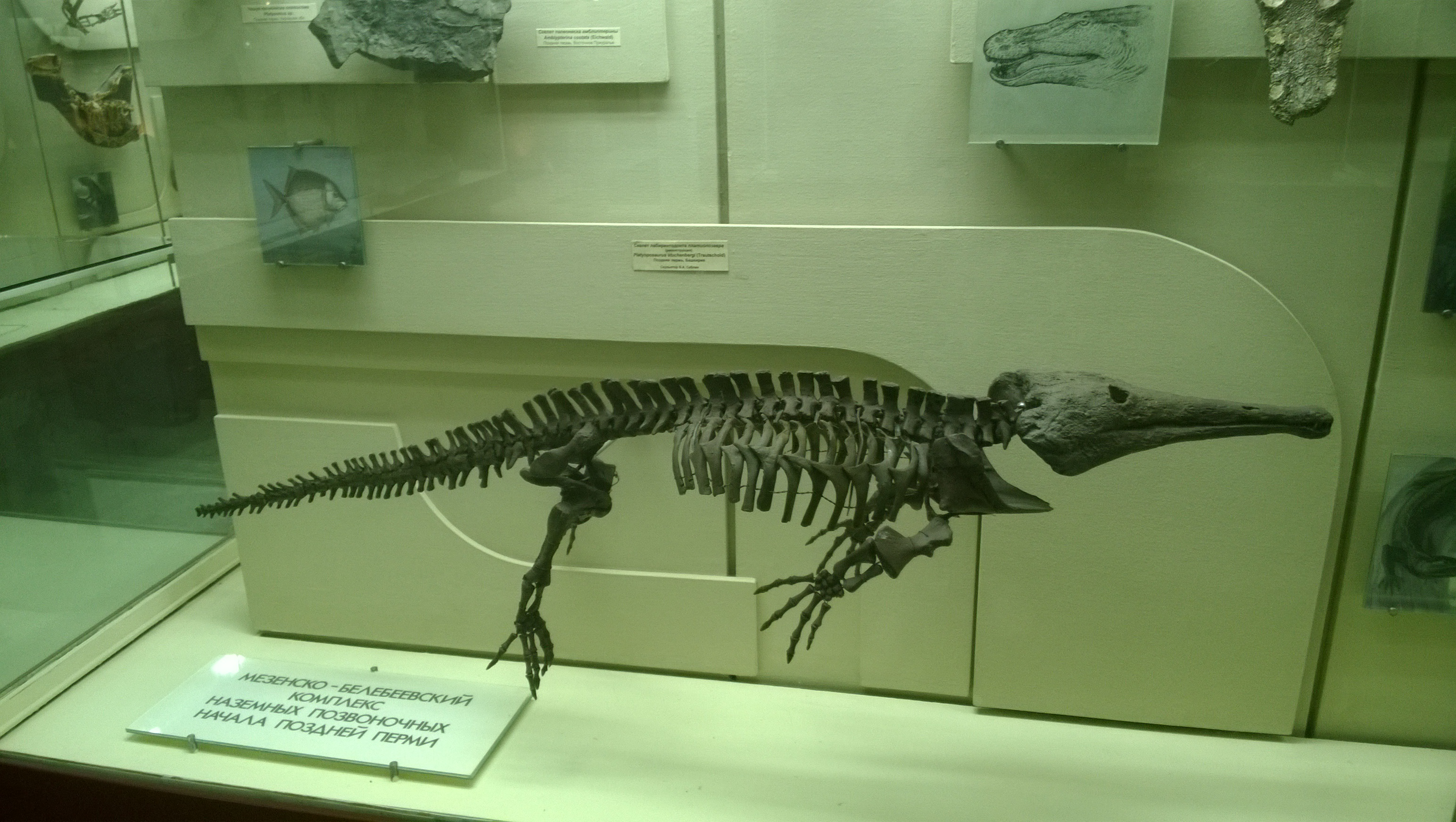
- Reconstructed skeleton of P. stuckenbergi

Scientific classification
- Domain: Eukaryota
- Kingdom: Animalia
- Phylum: Chordata
- Order: †Temnospondyli
- Family: †Archegosauridae
- Genus: †Platyoposaurus; Lydekker, 1889

Type species
- Platyops rickardi Twelvetrees, 1880

Other species
- P. stuckenbergi; P. watsoni

= Platyoposaurus =

Platyoposaurus Temporal range: Middle Permian

Genus of amphibians

Platyoposaurus was a temnospondyl from the Middle Permian epoch about 270-268 Mya.

== Discovery ==
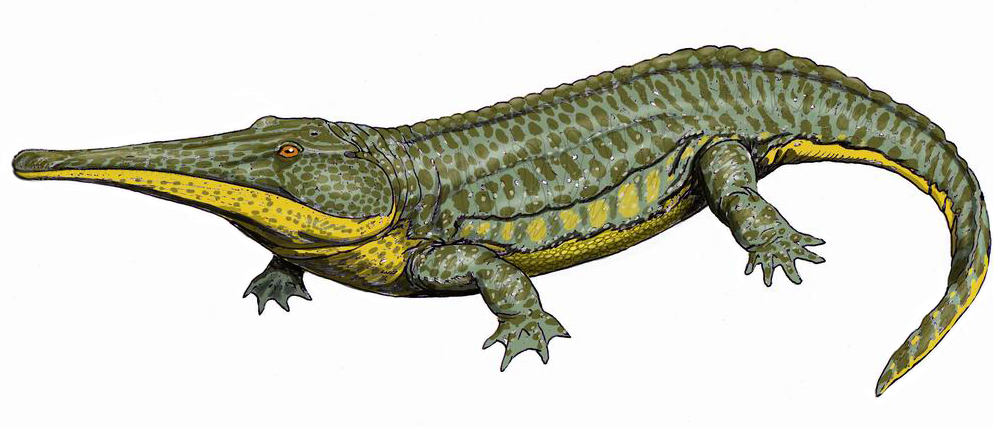
Restoration of P. stuckenbergi

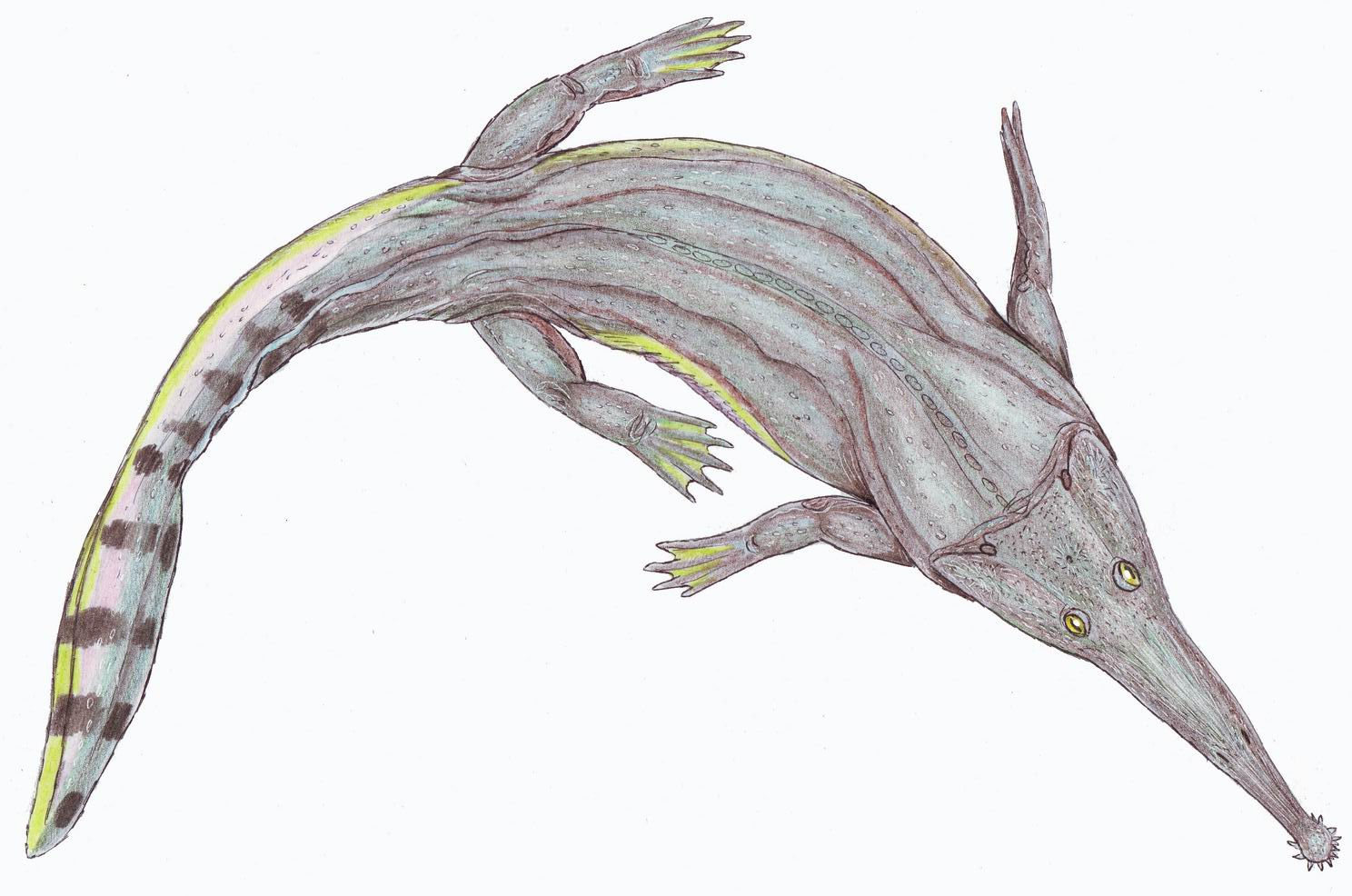
Restoration of P. watsoni

One of the discoveries includes a skull 28 cm long with a purported body length of 250 cm representing a carnivorous adult specimen.

The fossil remains were found in Belebey in Bashkortostan, Russia; the name Platyoposaurus means "flat-faced lizard" and was coined after the original name Platyops turned out to be preoccupied.
