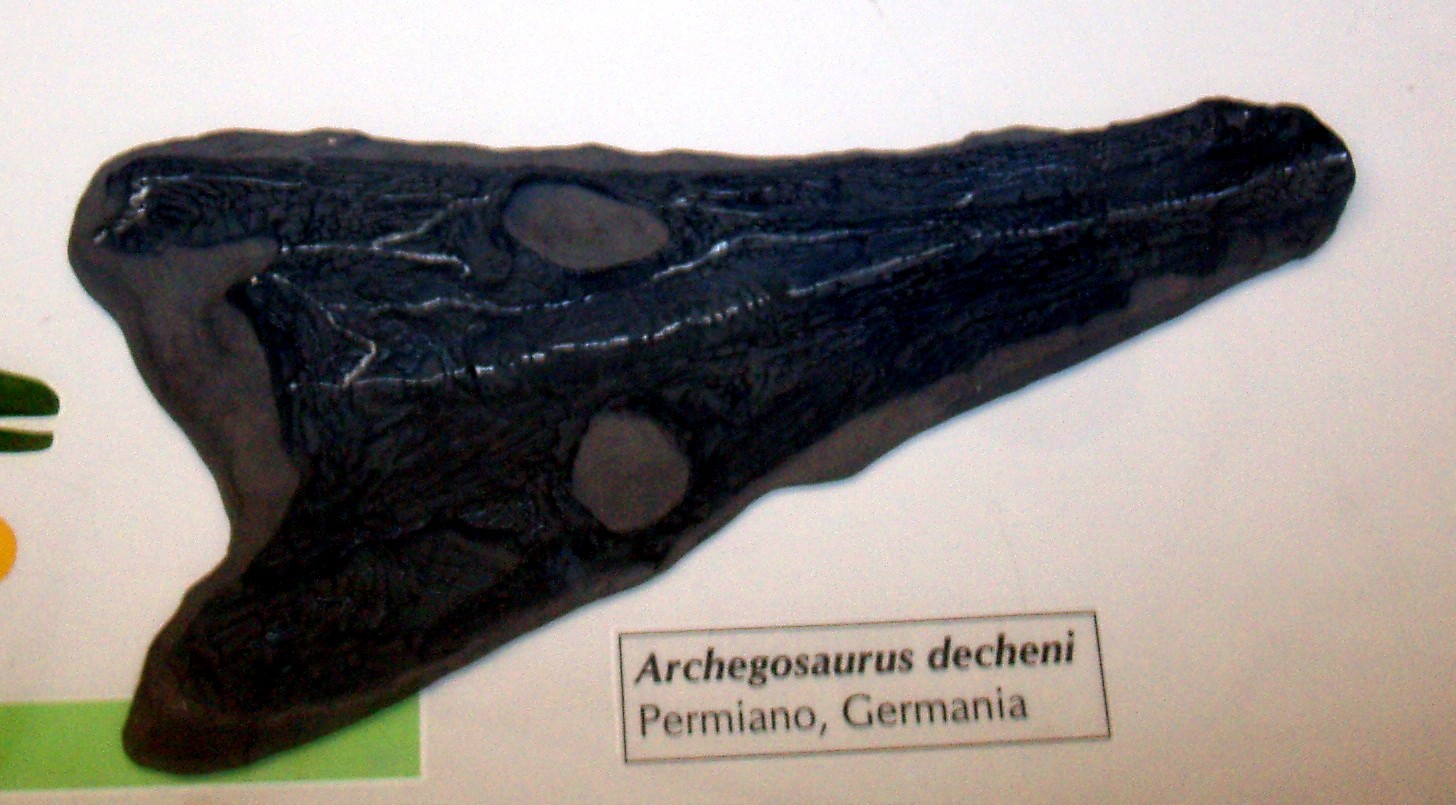
- A. decheni skull

Scientific classification
- Kingdom: Animalia
- Phylum: Chordata
- Clade: Tetrapoda
- Order: †Temnospondyli
- Family: †Archegosauridae
- Genus: †Archegosaurus; Goldfuss, 1847

Type species
- †Archegosaurus decheni Goldfuss, 1847

Other species
- †A. dyscriton (Steen, 1938 [originally Memonomenos dyscriton])

Synonyms
- Memonomenos Steen, 1938

= Archegosaurus =

Archegosaurus Temporal range: Early Permian - Late Permian, 299–253 Ma

Extinct genus of amphibians

Archegosaurus is a genus of temnospondyl amphibian which lived during the Asselian to Wuchiapingian stages of the Permian, around 299-253 million years ago. The remains of this animal, consisting of at least 90 partial skeletons (mostly skulls), have been found in Germany. The name Archegosaurus was coined by Goldfuss in 1847. Archegosaurus is a member of Archegosauridae and is that family's type genus.

== Classification ==
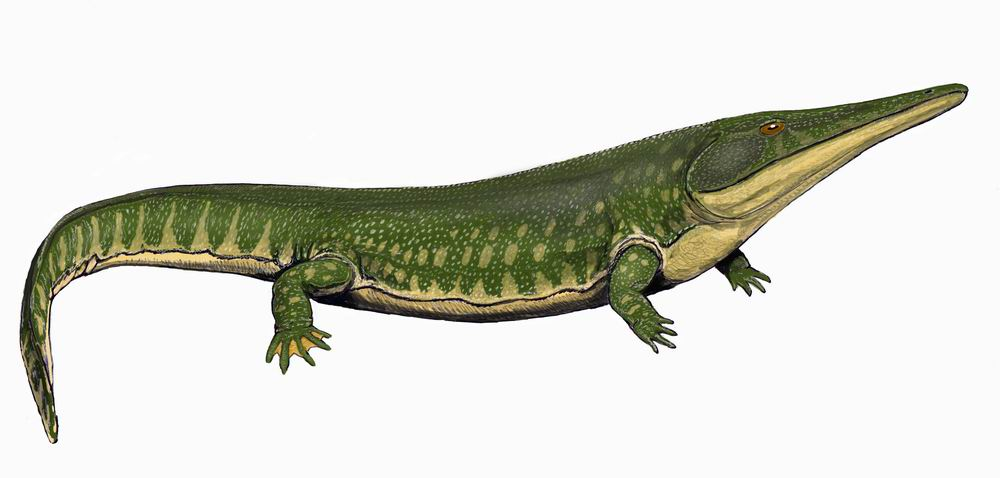
Restoration of A. decheni

In 1938, paleontologist Margaret C. Steen described a temnospondyl from the Permian-age Ruprechtice assemblage in northeast Bohemia. Steen named it Memonomenos dyscriton on the basis of a skull that was narrower than others in the Ruprechtice. It was classified as an anthracosaur, a group closely related to reptiles. Both Memonomenos and embolomere anthracosaurs had vertebrae that were divided into several parts, including a pleurocentrum and intercentrum. Animals with this type of divided vertebrae were said to be rachitomi. During the early twentieth century, paleontologists considered rhachitomous temnospondyls to be the descendants of embolomeres, and Steen considered Memonomenos to be a link between these two groups. Steen also noted that Memonomenos had large tabular horns, a feature shared with anthracosaurs. Temnospondyls and anthracosaurs were later found to be two distantly related groups, and paleontologist Alfred Romer placed Memonomenos within Anthracosauria. This placement was accepted until 1978 when Memonomenos was reassigned to the genus Archegosaurus and classified as a temnospondyl. Memonomenos dyscriton became a second species of Archegosaurus, A. dyscriton.

== Biology ==
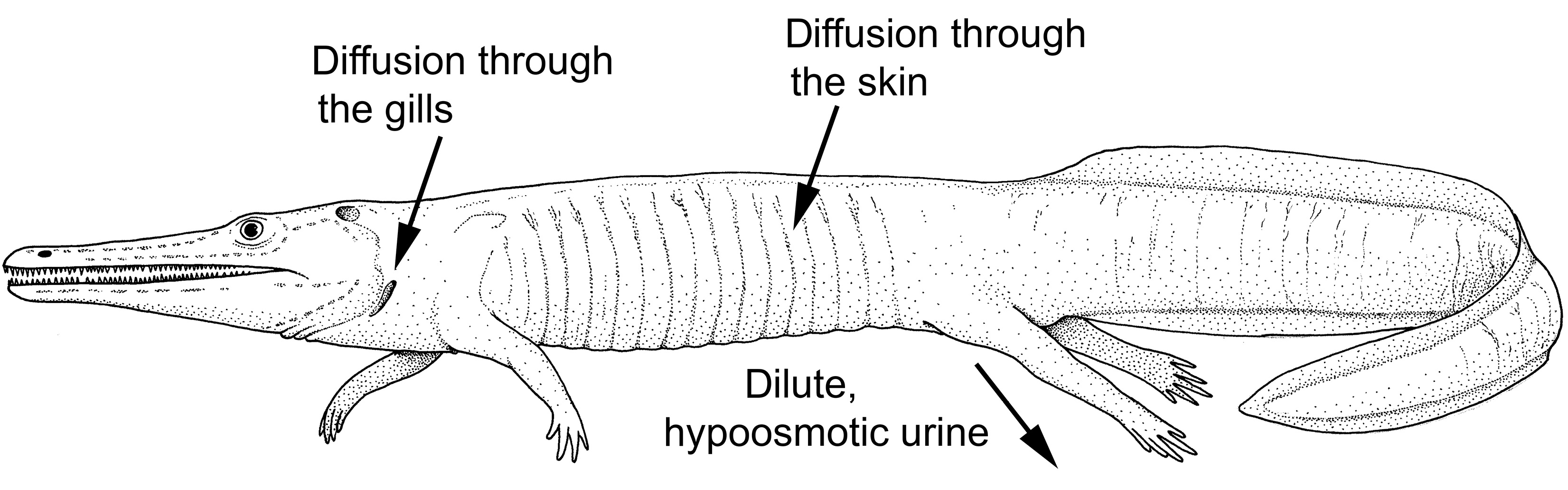
Water balance in Archegosaurus.

Archegosaurus was a fully aquatic animal. A study regarding its metabolism, gas exchange, osmoregulation, and digestion suggest that it was rather similar to fish, rather than modern aquatic amphibians like salamanders.
