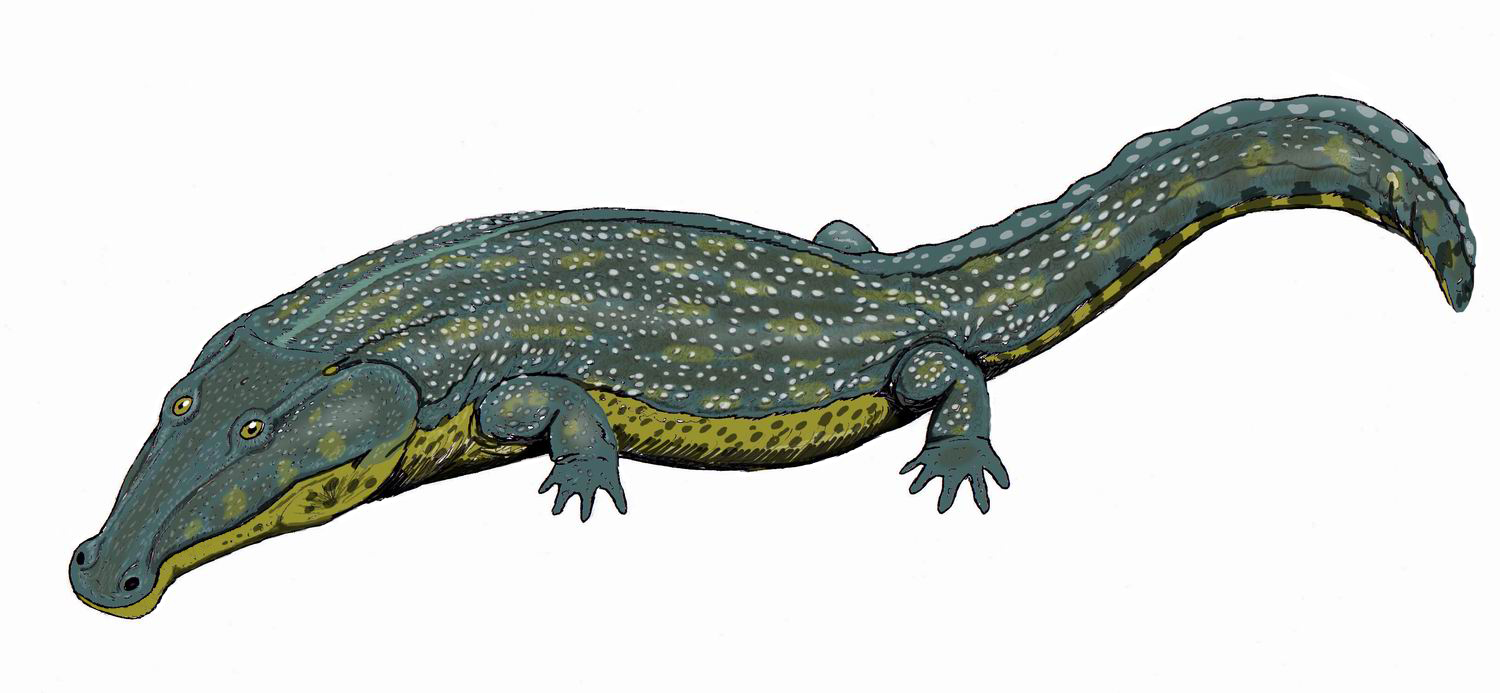
- Life restoration of M. platyrhinus

Scientific classification
- Kingdom: Animalia
- Phylum: Chordata
- Clade: Tetrapoda
- Order: †Temnospondyli
- Family: †Archegosauridae
- Subfamily: †Melosaurinae
- Genus: †Melosaurus von Meyer, 1857

Species
- M. platyrhinus; M. paucidens; M. uralensis

= Melosaurus =

Melosaurus Temporal range: Permian, 299–245 Ma

Extinct genus of amphibians

Melosaurus is an extinct genus of temnospondyl amphibian. Fossils of it have been found in Russia. Fossil remains of Melosaurus uralensis were discovered at Belebei in Russia. Its fossils dated of the Asselian-Olenekian stages (299–245 million years ago). Fossils of Melosaurus sp. were also unearthed at the site. Fossils of Melosaurus uralensis were found at the Sterlitamak site in Bashkortostan in Russia. The span of the strata is listed as Wordian (268–265.8 million years ago).

Life restoration of M. uralensis

Melosaurus was 2.5–3 m (8.2–9.8 ft) in length. It lived around ponds, lakes, rivers, and marshes. The diet of Melosaurus consisted of fish and smaller tetrapods. Melosaurus was a powerful predator. It very likely preyed upon Discosauriscus (an aquatic batrachosaur).

== Bibliography ==
- Meyer, Hermann von. 1860. Melosaurus Uralensis aus dem Permischen System des westlichen Ural's. Palaeontographica. S.~90-98
- Y.u. M. Gubin. 1989. Concerning the systematic position of the labyrinthodonts from the Malaya Kinel' locality, Orenburg Oblast [O sistematicheskom polozhenii labirintodontov iz mestonakhozhdeniya Malaya Kinel' (Orenburgskaya oblast').]. Paleontologicheskiy Zhurnal, Moscow 3:116-120
