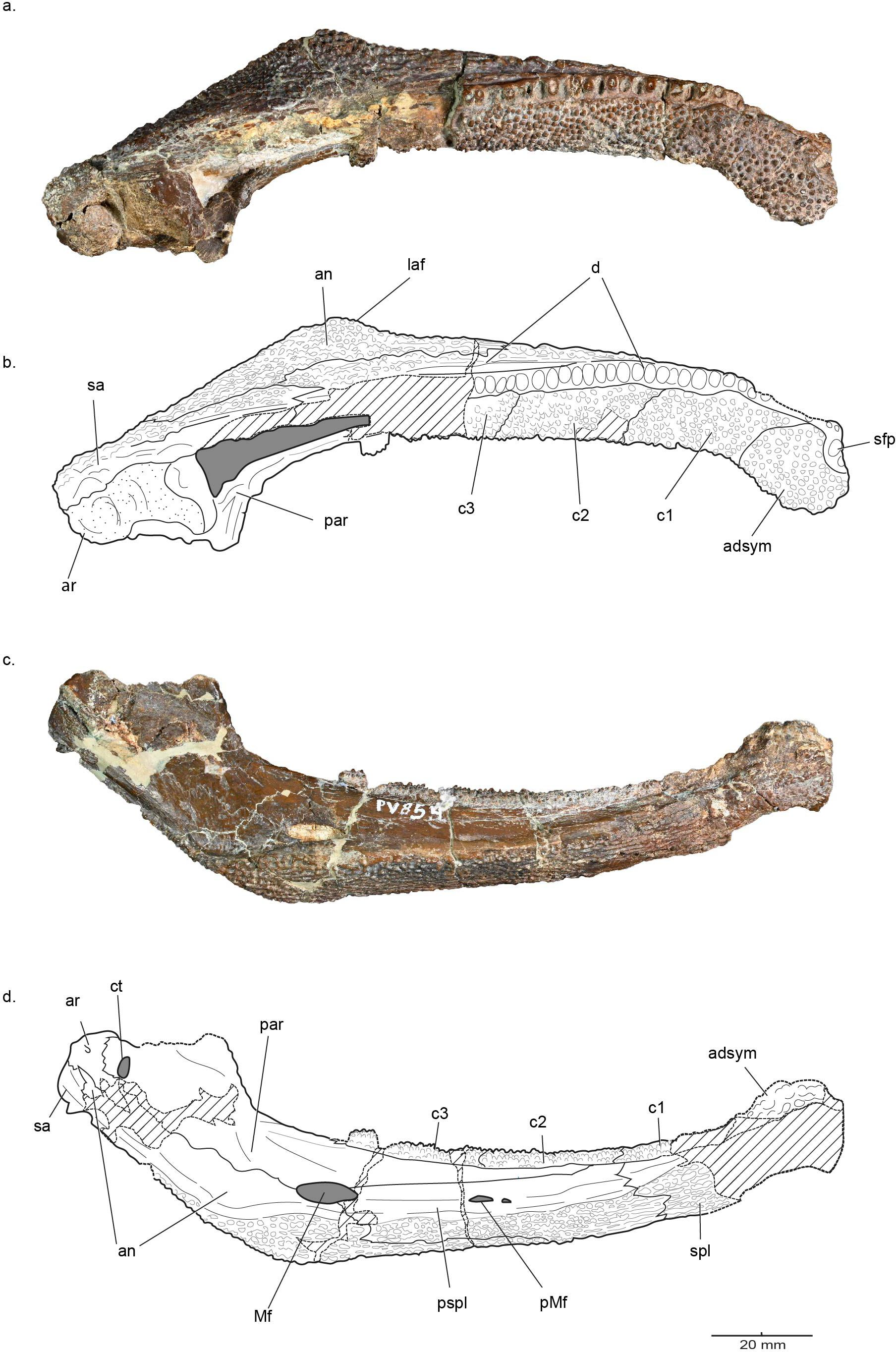
- Holotype mandible of T. amnicola seen from above (a, b) and below (c, d)

Scientific classification
- Kingdom: Animalia
- Phylum: Chordata
- Clade: Elpistostegalia
- Clade: Stegocephali
- Genus: †Tanyka; Pardo et al., 2026
- Species: †T. amnicola

Binomial name
- †Tanyka amnicola Pardo et al., 2026

= Tanyka =

Tanyka Temporal range: Early Permian, Kungurian

Genus of early tetrapod

Tanyka (lit. 'jaw') is an extinct genus of amphibious early stem-tetrapod known from the Early Permian (Kungurian age) Pedra de Fogo Formation of Brazil. The genus contains a single species, Tanyka amnicola, known from several mandibular remains. It is one of the few Gondwanan stem-tetrapods known to have survived into the Permian. The lower jaw is strongly twisted, with extensive fields of teeth, likely allowing it to process aquatic plants or small invertebrates.

Prior to the discovery of Tanyka, the prevailing view on tetrapod evolution was that the early stem-groups were suddenly replaced by temnospondyl amphibians and amniotes following the Carboniferous rainforest collapse at the end of the Moscovian age (~307 million years ago). However, Tanyka and other late-surviving tetrapods from the Early Permian, like Gaiasia jennyae (described in 2024), demonstrate that the replacement of stem-tetrapods by later temnospondyls and amniotes was more complex than previous hypotheses implied.

== Discovery and naming ==
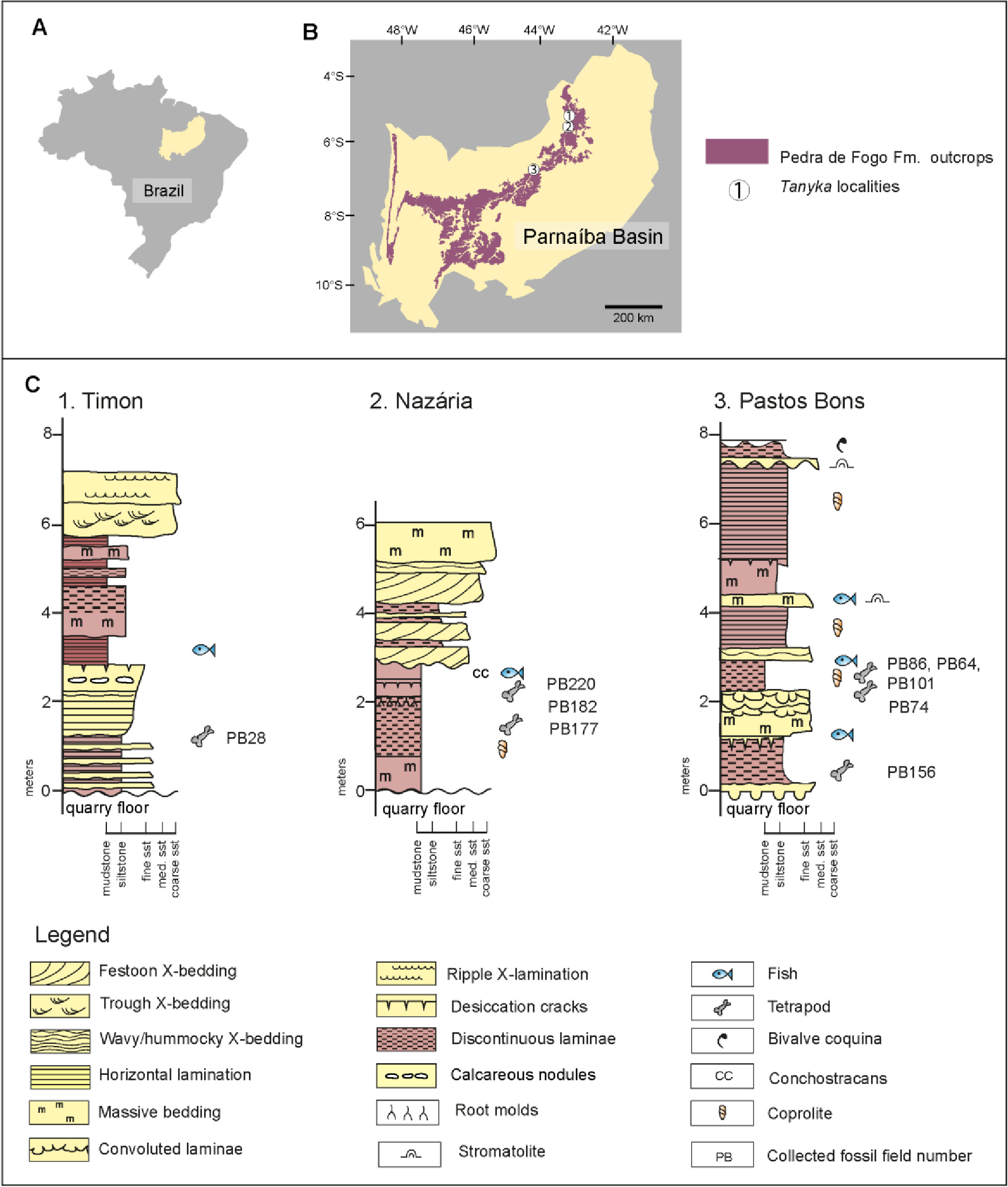
Geology of localities (1–3, labeled on the map in B) from which Tanyka is known

The Tanyka fossil material was discovered in outcrops of the Pedra de Fogo Formation near Pastos Bons in Maranhão, Brazil. The specimens assigned to this taxon comprise several mandibles of varying levels of completeness, housed in the Museu de Arqueologia e Paleontologia (Federal University of Piauí). The most complete of these are accessioned as MAP-PV 662 and MAP-PV 097. Some of the material was initially identified as an inderterminate rhinesuchid temnospondyl by Cisneros (2015). However, after reexamination of additional, more complete material, it became apparent that the fossils pertained to a distinct taxon with characteristics excluding it from all known temnospondyl groups.

In 2026, Jason D. Pardo and colleagues described Tanyka amnicola as a new genus and species of early tetrapod based on these fossil remains, establishing MAP-PV 662 as the holotype specimen. The generic name, Tanyka, is derived from the Guarani word tañykã, meaning 'jaw' or 'chin'. The specific name, amnicola, is a Latin word meaning 'living in or next to the river'. This alludes to the discovery of the holotype in a river bed, as well as the species' likely aquatic ecology.

== Description ==
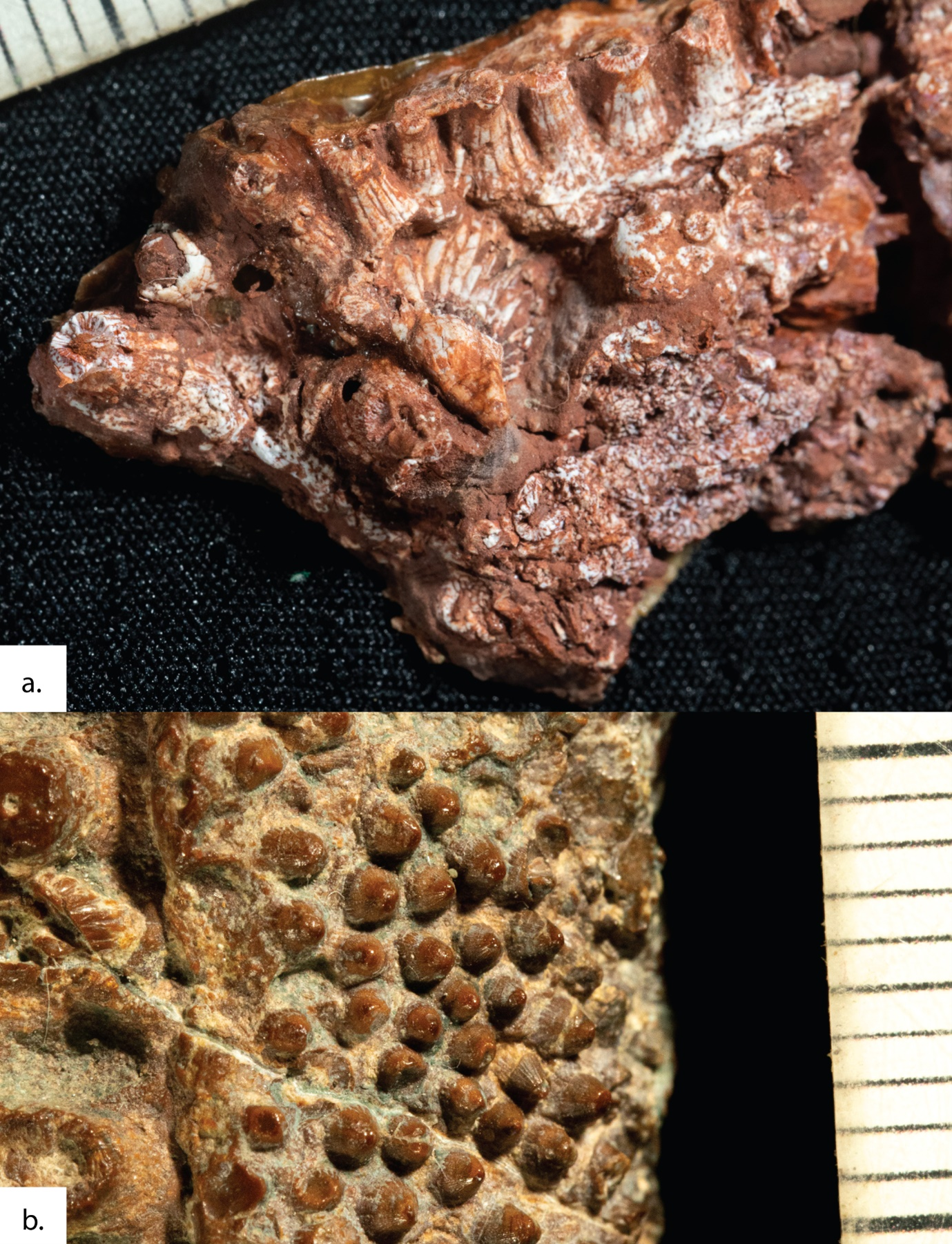
Symphyseal (top) and coronoid (bottom) denticles of Tanyka

Tanyka is exclusively known from lower jaw remains. The holotype mandible is 17.2 centimetres (6.8 in) long, with most other referred specimens being roughly the same size. Specimen MAP-PV 360, the posterior (rear) part of a mandible, is around 25% larger than the holotype. As in other stem-tetrapods, the jaw has an approximate L-shape in dorsal (top) view, in which the articular bone elevates itself considerably in relation to the tooth row. The lateral (side) and ventral (bottom) portions of the jaw exhibit honeycomb-like sculpturing, giving place to tubercles and ridges, with specially accentuated tubercles at the corner of the angular bone.

The dentary has large, flattened teeth, while the three coronoid and adsymphyseal bones are wide, bearing a pavement of small denticles. Although also found in baphetid amphibians, the coronoid denticles in Tanyka are comparatively larger and more bulbous. In some specimens, these denticles appear somewhat worn. As a consequence of its shape and torsion, when the jaws closed, they would occlude in such a way that the coronoid denticles would contact the upper jaw, not the dentary bones, which would be orientated outward.

== Classification and evolution ==
The characteristics of the jaw of Tanyka indicate it is more closely related to stem-tetrapods than temnospondyls or amniotes. The wide, denticled coronoid series observed in Tanyka is common in baphetid amphibians. Likewise, the mandible of baphetids sometimes also shows a weakly developed ridge area, though the heavy sculpturing of the flange seen in Tanyka is not known from any other early tetrapod.

To test the relationships and affinities of Tanyka, Pardo and colleagues (2026) included it in the phylogenetic matrices of Ahlberg & Clack (2020), which includes mostly characters relating to the lower jaw and samples few crown-group tetrapods, and Marsicano et al. (2024), which has a more broad character set and more comprehensive sampling of crown-tetrapods. Both datasets definitively placed Tanyka as a part of the tetrapod stem-group. The branching order of some stem-tetrapod lineages was inconsistent in the analyses, but Tanyka was recognized as part of a grade of taxa traditionally regarded as 'baphetids'. As all other members of this group are known from the Moscovian age of the Carboniferous or older, Tanyka would be the youngest 'baphetid' and the only one known from the Permian. These phylogenetic results would indicate that Tanyka diverged from other tetrapods before the emergence of the earliest crown-group tetrapod, Balanerpeton, ~346 to 330 million years ago. Tanyka represents a clearly distinct lineage from Gaiasia, another late-surviving stem-tetrapod from Namibia, demonstrating that stem-tetrapods were still ecologically diverse well into the Early Permian. A cladogram summarizing the possible placement of Tanyka in relation to other stem-tetrapods is shown below:

- - †Whatcheeriidae
  - - †'Crassigyrinidae'
    - - †Aistopoda
      - †Colosteidae
      - †Embolomeri
      - - †Baphetoidea
        - †Tanyka
        - - Temnospondyli
          - - †Seymouriamorpha
            - Amniota

== Paleobiology ==
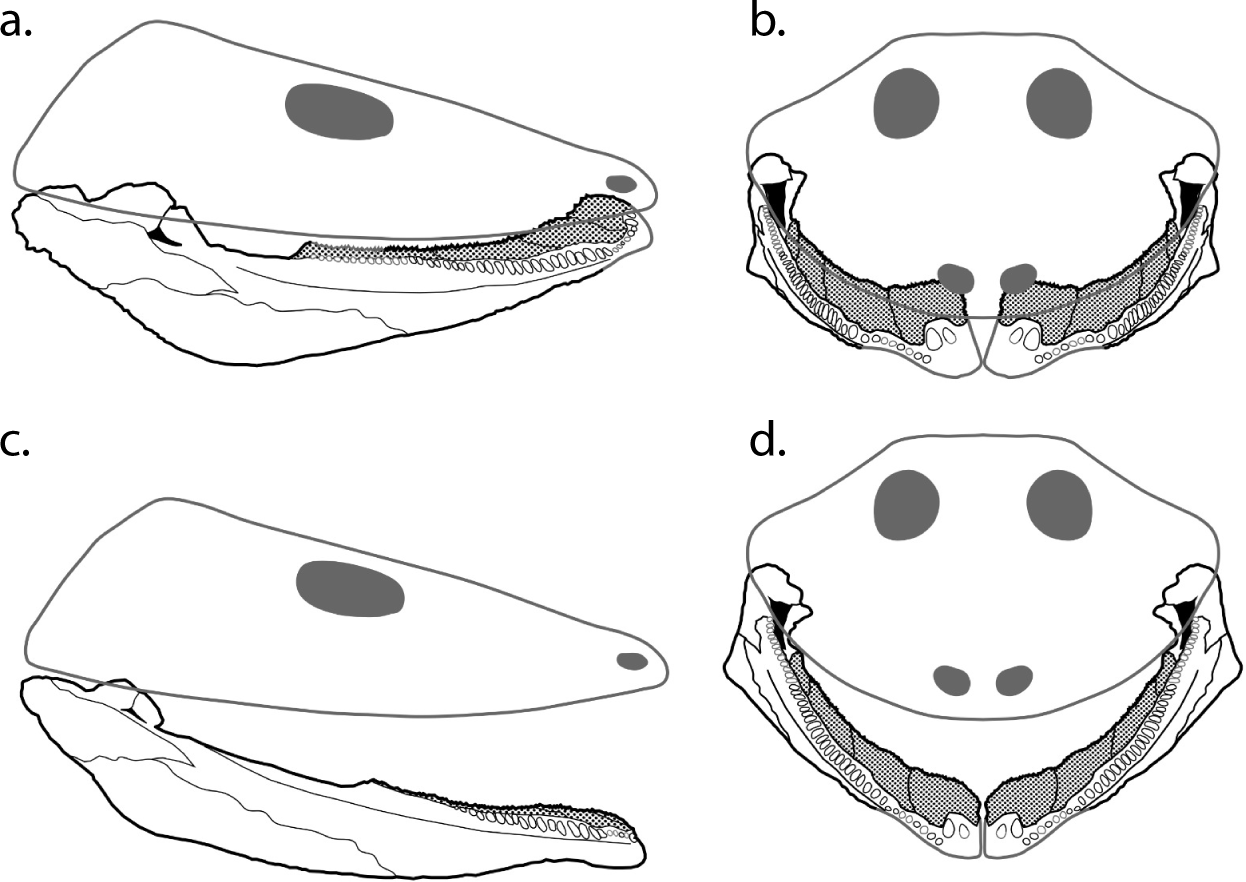
Skull reconstruction of Tanyka amnicola, with jaw articulation.

Due to the peculiar shape and articulation of the jaw and flattened dentition of Tanyka, Pardo et al. (2026) suggested that it used its denticled jaws to feed on small invertebrates or rasp aquatic plants, rather than handling large prey. It may have had a similar feeding strategy to the greater siren (Siren lacertina), an extant salamanders, which also possesses coronoid teeth. Although not the only known stem-tetrapod to have developed a unique feeding strategy—Acherontiscus has been proposed to feed on small hard-shelled invertebrates, while Spathicephalus and Sigournea have been proposed as filter feeders—Tanyka is unique in being the first recorded instance of herbivory or omnivory in stem-tetrapods. This evidence implies that even in the Early Permian, stem-tetrapods were still exploring new niches while competing with amniotes and other amphibian groups.

== Paleoecology ==
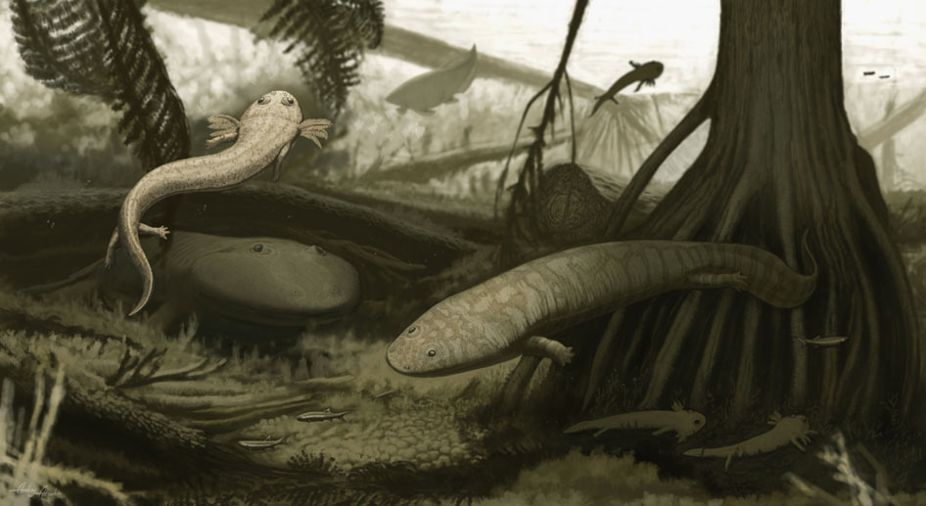
Paleoenvironmental reconstruction of the aquatic Pedra de Fogo ecoystem

Tanyka is known from the Pedra de Fogo Formation, which dates to the Kungurian age of the early Permian period (Cisuralian). Biostratigraphic evidence suggests a similar age as the Brazilian Irati Formation and German Chemnitz Fossil Forest, which have been radiometrically dated to 278 million years ago. The Pedra de Fogo Formation represents a hot and seasonally dry ecosystem which supported permanent bodies of water deep enough to accommodate large aquatic predators like Prionosuchus and other temnospondyls.

The Pedra de Fogo system hosted a diverse vertebrate fauna. Identified fish genera include Anisopleurodontis, Bythiacanthus, Glikmanius, Itapyrodus, Rubencanthus, Sphenacanthus, and Taquaralodus. Early amphious and aquatic temnospondyls that would have coexisted with Tankya in this formation include Prionosuchus, Procuhy, and Timonya. Later-diverging terrestrial tetrapods from this ecosystem include captorhinids such as Captorhinikos, early reptiles such as the acleistorhinid Karutia, and some unnamed synapsids.

Interestingly, Tanyka does not demonstrate a preference for a single habitat, since fossils referred to it have been found in localities representing ephemeral wetlands and lacustrine and playa habitats. Due to the lack of extensive data, it is unknown if Tanyka had unique physiological adaptations or life-history strategies to tolerate these disparate environments or whether this trait was shared by other stem-tetrapods.
