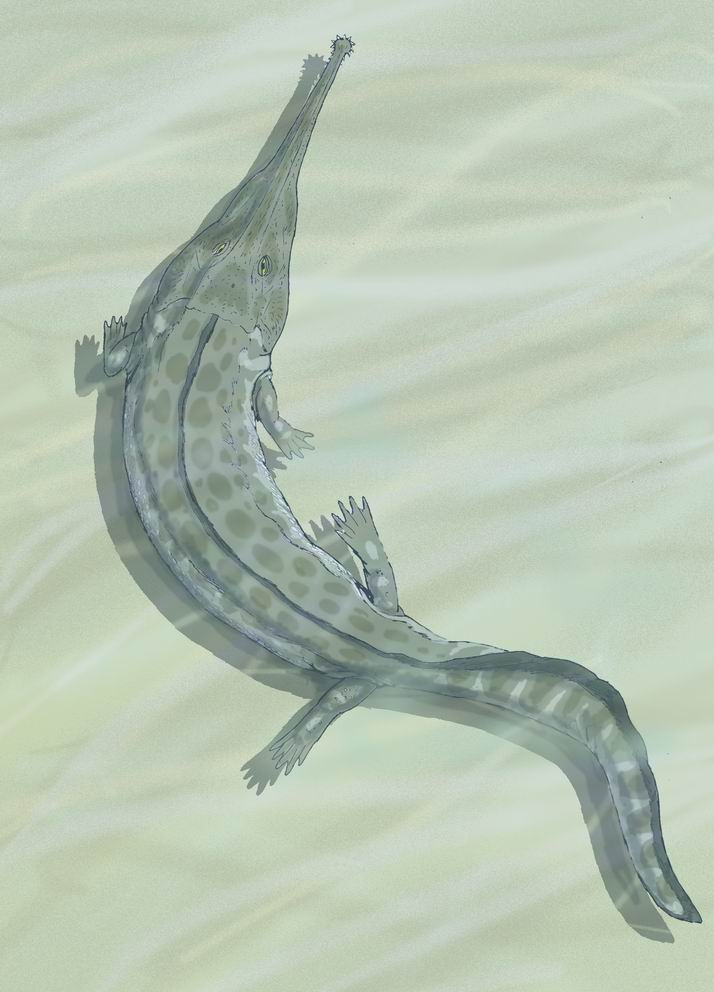
- Life restoration

Scientific classification
- Kingdom: Animalia
- Phylum: Chordata
- Clade: Tetrapoda
- Order: †Temnospondyli
- Family: †Archegosauridae
- Subfamily: †Platyoposaurinae
- Genus: †Prionosuchus; Price, 1948

Type species
- †Prionosuchus plummeri Price, 1948

Species
- Prionosuchus plummeri

= Prionosuchus =

Prionosuchus Temporal range: Cisuralian (Asselian to Kungurian) 299–272 Ma

Genus of amphibians (fossil)

Prionosuchus is an amphibian extinct genus of large temnospondyl. A single species P. plummeri, is recognized from the Early Permian (some time between 299 and 272 million years ago). Its fossils have been found in what is now northeastern Brazil.

== Description ==
Size of the holotype specimen (green) and largest known specimen (gray) relative to a human

The fragmentary remains of this animal have been found in the Pedra de Fogo Formation in the Parnaíba Basin of northeastern Brazil, in the states of Piauí and Maranhão, and it was described by L.I. Price in 1948. The incomplete skull of the holotype specimen has been estimated to be 50 centimetres (20 in) long. Several more fragmentary specimens have been found. One very fragmentary but very large specimen (BMNH R12005) appears to have come from an individual nearly three times the size of most other specimens, and may have had a skull that measured up to 1.6 metres (5.2 ft) long. Based on related species and comparisons with living gharials, the total body length of this specimen has been estimated to reach greater than 5.5 metres (18 ft).

With an elongated and tapered snout, numerous sharp teeth, long body, short legs, and a tail adapted for swimming, its general appearance was very similar to a modern gharial or gar, and it probably had a similar lifestyle as an ambush aquatic predator feeding on fish and other aquatic animals. A study of the closely related Archegosaurus shows that it had a heat balance, gas exchange, osmoregulation, and digestion process more similar to that of fish than modern aquatic amphibians; the same probably applied to Prionosuchus as well.

== Classification ==
Prionosuchus has been classified as an archegosaurid by Carroll. The genus is monotypic with P. plummeri being the only species described. The archegosaurs were a group of temnospondyls that occupied the ecological niche of crocodiles and alligators during the Permian, and of which the European genus Archegosaurus is typical. The group became extinct at the end of the Permian and the niche was subsequently filled by other, new temnospondyls, later joined by reptiles such as the phytosaurs in the Triassic period.

Cox and Hutchinson re-evaluated Prionosuchus in 1991 and synonymized it with the genus Platyoposaurus from Russia. On the basis of this study, the Pedra de Fogo Formation was reevaluated to be of Middle-to-Late Permian age. However, studies based on plants and pollens indicate that this formation is actually Early Permian in age, making Prionosuchus not contemporary with Platyoposaurus. More recent research rejects the later Permian date.

== Paleoecology ==
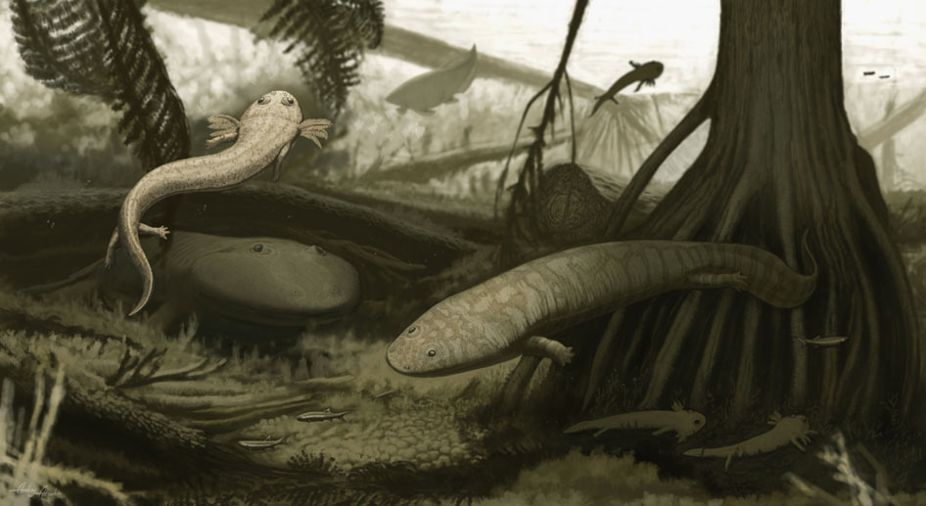
Restoration of paleoenvironment of Pedra de Fogo Formation

Prionosuchus lived in a humid and tropical environment as indicated by the petrified forest of the Pedra de Fogo Formation in which fossils of this animal have been found. The strata composed of siltstones, shales and limestones were deposited in lagoonal and fluvial environments. Other animals discovered in the same formation include other amphibians (Procuhy, Timonya, and a rhinesuchid), captorhinids (Captorhinikos and two other, unnamed taxa), parareptile (Karutia) and fish including chondrichthyans (Rubencanthus, Sphenacanthus, Bythiacanthus, Taquaralodus, Itapyrodus, Anisopleurodontis), palaeoniscids (Brazilichthys), and lungfish.
