= Pedra de Fogo Formation =

Geological formation in Brazil

- Stratigraphic range: Kungurian; ~278 Ma
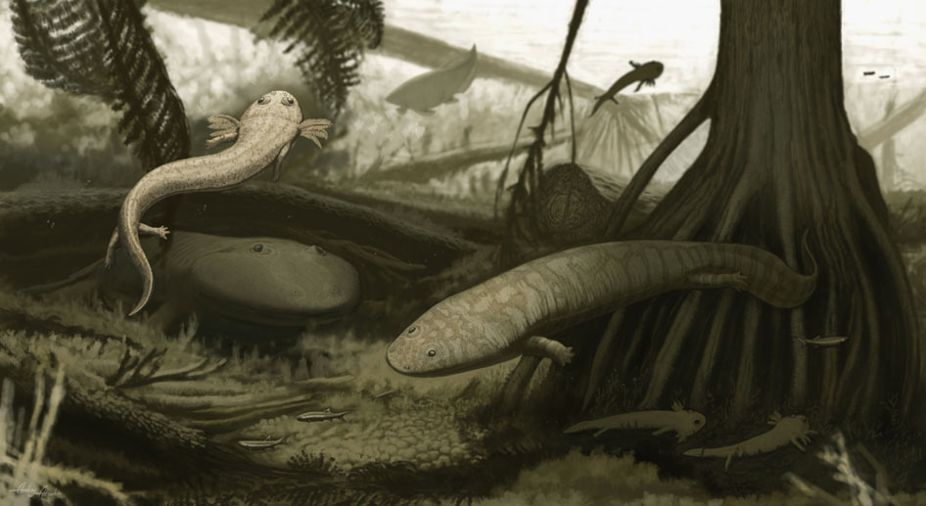
- A paleoart reconstruction the aquatic fauna of the Pedra de Fogo Formation.
- Type: Geological formation
- Unit of: Balsas Group
- Sub-units: Basal Silex, Middle and Trisidela members
- Underlies: Motuca Formation
- Overlies: Piauí Formation
- Thickness: 10–100 m (33–328 ft)

Lithology
- Primary: Silt, Limestone & Chert

Location
- Region: Maranhão, Piauí & Tocantins
- Country: Brazil
- Extent: Parnaíba Basin

Type section
- Named for: Portuguese: "Firestone", in reference of the flint found in the region.
- Named by: Plummer (1948)

The Pedra de Fogo Formation is an Early Permian (Kungurian) geological formation of the Parnaíba Basin, northeastern Brazil. It has outcrops mainly on the states of Maranhão and Piauí, as well as some in Tocantins. It is thought to have been deposited in a continental and lacustrine environment, with occasional marine influences, on seasonal floodplains, channels and small ponds.

This formation has produced abundant remains of both animals and plants, the majority of which is represented by vertebrates, like temnospondyl amphibians such as Prionosuchus, captorhinid reptiles, and fishes like chondrichthians, actinopterygians and sarcopterygians. Petrified wood is also widely known from the formation, to the point of being one of its main diagnostic features. The northern portions of the formation provide taxa continental in origin, the middle portion a mixture between continental and marine taxa and the southern portion exhibits a predominance of marine taxa.

== History ==
Fossils from the Pedra de Fogo Formation have been known since at least the 19th century, with Brongniart describing the first petrified wood fossil from the region in 1872, that being the stem of the fern Psaronius brasiliensis. The fossil was collected in the state of Piauí, between the municipalities of Oeiras and São Gonçalo do Piauí.

The formation was first recognized and defined by Brazilian paleontologist F. B. Plummer in 1948, after a visit to the Parnaíba Basin made by him alongside L. I. Price and Gomes in 1946. He defined the Pedra de Fogo Formation to classify chert and Psaronius fossil ferns that crop out in between the municipalities of Nova Iorque and Pastos Bons, in the state of Maranhão. The name "Pedra de Fogo" means "Firestone" in Portuguese, and is named after a small stream that runs through the area, whose name, in turn, comes from the abundance of flint, or firestone, present on its beds. In short visits during 1945 and 1946, Price collected fossils of fish and amphibians south of the municipality of Pastos Bons. The amphibian, later described by Price in 1948 as Prionosuchus plummeri, would be both the first temnospondyl described from South America and possibly one of the biggest ever found. The fish fossils were identified as fin-spines and teeth from ctenacanth and xenacanth sharks respectively, palaeoniscoid scales, as well as coprolites and Psaronius plant fossils, with this being the first fossil plant taxon officially described from Brazil. Price then concluded that the formation was of Permo-Carboniferous age, probably pertaining to the Early Permian.

The finding of Prionosuchus was of special interest, for being the first Early Permian amphibian found in South America, as well as being for the longest time one of the few tetrapods of that age known from Gondwanaland. As such, two visits were made to the Basin: The first was made in 1970 by Price and J. Attridge, who found some fragments of amphibians. The second, made in 1972, was a larger party made out of C. Barry Cox, Attridge, Price and his assistant D. A. Campos.

== Description ==
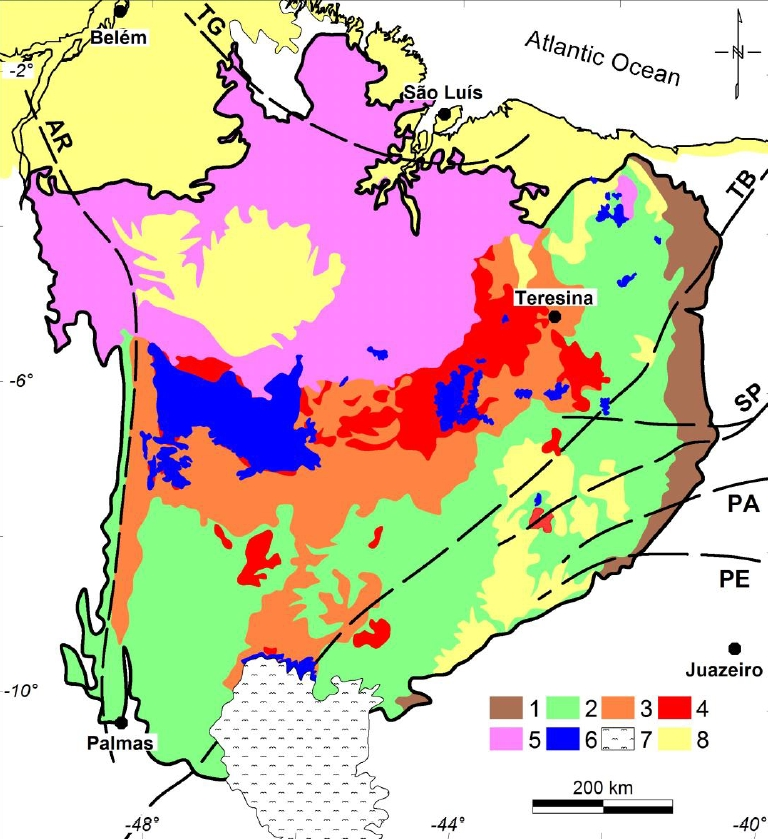
Geologic map of the Parnaíba Basin, the Pedra de Fogo Formation is located on the orange zone.

=== Geology ===
The Pedra de Fogo Formation is described as being made out of alternating deposits of silt, limestone and chert. Plummer (1948) described the silt layers as containing the vertebrate fossils, while and the chert beds containing large petrified wood in some layers. The sedimentation of this formation occurred in cycles, with each cycle beginning with sandstones, followed by fine-grained sandstones or mudstones, concretionary or oolitic limestone, and then limestone lenses and greenish fossiliferous shales. In the mid-south portion of the Parnaíba Basin, the formation is described as presenting out crops 100 m in thickness. Faria & Truckenbrodt (1980) proposed a division of the Pedra de Fogo Formation into three members: Basal Silex, Middle and Trisidela. Later studies also divided the formation in members which correlate well with the stratigraphy devised by Faria & Truckenbrodt.

The Lower Member, or Basal Silex, is approximately 20 m thick and is composed by mudstone and grey/purple/brown shales, and dispersed amongst these layers, some dolomitic layers with some dark chert concretions. The Middle Member is more fine-grained clastic, and consists of sandstones, limestones and mudstones which are sometimes carbonitic. The Upper Member, or Trisidela, is approximately 40 m thick, consisting of grey dolomitic layers with mudstones scattered in between, greenish-grey carbonate shales, and limestones with chert layers and concretions.

=== Age ===
The age of this formation, as well as the age of the close by Motuca Formation, has been up to debate for many years, with differing authors proposing various ages based on fossil plants, fossil pollen, fish remains and temnospondyl amphibian remains. The stratigraphic range of the ctenacanth shark genus Glikmanius restricts the age to be between the Carboniferous and the Guadalupian (Middle Permian). Palynological studies have proposed it to be Cisuralian (Lower Permian) in age, also given the similarities between the pollen from the Pedra de Fogo Formation and the Flowerpot Formation on Texas (Cisuralian–Guadalupian). There is much overlap between the fossil plant community of both formations and that of the Chemnitz petrified forest in German, dated to be 278 ± 5 Myr ago, in the Kungurian age. This conclusion is further supported by the discovery of the chondrichthyan Itapyrodus in both this formation and on the Irati Formation of the southern Paraná Basin, dated to 278.4 ± 5 Myr ago, and the discovery of the reptile Captorhinus aguti, later identified as Captorhinikos, whose last appearance on the fossil record was during the middle Kungurian in North America. The presence of Prionosuchus was proposed by some to indicate a younger Guadalupian–Lopingian age (Middle to Late Permian), however this conclusion has been rejected by subsequent authors for being based on the evolutionary history of a single taxon and not biostratigraphy.

=== Paleoenvironment ===
Size of the holotype specimen of Prionosuchus (green) and largest known specimen (gray) relative to a human.

During the time of its deposition 278 Myr ago, the Pedra de Fogo Formation was located much further south than today, with the Tropic of Capricorn passing through the region. This formation was deposited in restricted, shallow inland seas, as well as coastal and continental environments, mostly during warm climates, with the northern portions of the formation providing taxa continental in origin, the middle portion providing a mixture between continental and marine taxa and the southern portion exhibiting a predominance of marine taxa. Some fossil-bearing regions have been interpreted as fluvio-lacustrine in origin, deposited in a variety of both aquatic and terrestrial sub-environments on the margins and nearshores of big continental lakes, on seasonal floodplains and channels, and in small ponds.

The flora described of this formation is not very diverse and made up of a few endemic species known from petrified wood and compressed material. Despite the large area which the Pedra de Fogo Formation extends over, there are still significant gaps on the paleobotanical understanding of this formation. Moreover, there is a frequent uncertainty about the correct stratigraphic position and sedimentary environment in which these fossils were deposited. Some of these fossil plants include the tree fern Psaronius, a dubious cycad Teresinoxylon, a lycophyte Cyclostigma, among others. Similarly rich is the assemblange of mostly aquatic vertebrates that the formation has produced, although some reptiles have also been found. Some of the aquatic fauna includes many chondrichthyans, such as ctenacanth and xenacanth sharks, eugeneodonts, petalodonts, the palaeonisciform Brazilicthys, and some undescribed lungfish and coelacanths. There are also a number of temnospondyl amphibians from the area, the most notable of which being Prionosuchus, but also the dvinosaurs Timonya anneae and Procuhy nazariensis, as well as an unnamed rhinesuchid. Stromatolites are also present.

== Fossil content ==
Color key: Taxon / Reclassified taxon / Taxon falsely reported as present / Dubious taxon or junior synonym / Ichnotaxon / Ootaxon / Morphotaxon	Notes; Uncertain or tentative taxa are in small text; ~~crossed out~~ taxa are discredited.

=== Flora ===
Genus	Species	Presence	Description	Images
Calamites	Calamites sp.		A horsetail.	
Cordaixylon	C. sp. 1		A cordaitalean	
Cordaixylon	C. sp. 2		A cordaitalean	
Cyclostigma	C. brasiliensis		A lycophyte vascular plant	
Ductolobatopitys	D. mussae		A gymnosperm	
Europoxylon	E. garapensis		A gymnosperm	
Kaokoxylon	K. brasiliensis		A gymnosperm	
Novaiorquepitys	N. maranhensis		A gymnosperm	
Pecopteris	P. sp.		A fern	
Polycanaloxylon	P. merlottii		A gymnosperm	
Psaronius	P. brasiliensis		A marattialean fern	
Psaronius	P. arrojadoi		A marattialean fern	
Rhachiphyllum	R. sp.		A pteridosperm	
Sphenophyllum	S. sp.		A fern	
Teresinoxylon	T. euzebioi		A pteridosperm	
Tietea	T. singularis		A fern tree	
Yvyrapitys	Y. novaiorquensis		A gymnosperm	

=== Fish ===
Genus	Species	Presence	Description	Images
Anisopleurodontis	A. pricei		An agassizodontid	
Brazilichthys	B. macrognathus		A palaeonisciform	
Bythiacanthus	B. lopesi		A heslerodid	
Glikmanius			A ctenacanth shark	
Itapyrodus	I. punctatus		A petalodont	
Nazaria	N. limnica		A deep-bodied ray-finned ish	
Piratata	P. rogersmithii		A deep-scaled ray-finned fish	
Rubencanthus	R. diplotuberculatus		A sphenacanthid	
Sphenacanthus	S. maranhensis S. ignis		A sphenacanthid	
Taquaralodus	T. albuquerquei		A chondrichthyan	

=== Amphibians ===
Genus	Species	Presence	Description	Images
Tanyka	T. amnicola	Lower Pedra de Fogo Formation	A late-surviving stem-tetrapod	
Prionosuchus	P. plummeri		A archegosaurid temnospondyl	
Procuhy	P. nazariensis	Lower Pedra de Fogo Formation	A trimerorhachid temnospondyl	
Rhinesuchidae indet	Indeterminate	Lower Pedra de Fogo Formation	An unnamed rhinesuchid temnospondyl	
Timonya	T. anneae	Lower Pedra de Fogo Formation	A dvinosaurian temnospondyl	

=== Reptiliomorphs ===
Genus	Species	Presence	Description	Images
Captorhinidae indet.	Indeterminate		An unnamed captorhinid	
Captorhinikos	C. sp.	Lower Pedra de Fogo Formation	A captorhinid. Previously referred as Captorhinus aguti.	
Moradisaurinae indet.	Indeterminate		An unnamed moradisaurine captorhinid	
Sphenacodontia indet.	Indeterminate		An unnamed sphenacodont synapsid, possibly a member of Sphenacodontidae	
Synapsida indet.	Indeterminate		An unnamed synapsid	
Karutia	K. fortunata	Lower Pedra de Fogo Formation	An acleistorhinid reptile	
