= Brazilichthys =

Brazilichthys Temporal range: Cisuralian ~279.3–272 Ma

Scientific classification
- Kingdom: Animalia
- Phylum: Chordata
- Class: Actinopterygii
- Family: †Brazilichthyidae; Cox & Hutchinson, 1991
- Genus: †Brazilichthys; Cox & Hutchinson, 1991
- Species: †B. macrognathus

Binomial name
- †Brazilichthys macrognathus Cox & Hutchinson, 1991

Extinct genus of fishes

Brazilichthys is an extinct genus of ray-finned fish found in the early Permian of northern Brazil. It is currently only known from the Pedra De Fogo Formation, a formation within the Parnaíba Basin. It was not a large fish though did possess extremely large teeth on the inner tooth rows, suggesting that the fish was macropredatory. This suggestion not only comes from the presence of these large teeth but also how the teeth were replaced, being comparable to how they are replaced in piranhas. The exact classification of the fish has been questioned by authors with some suggesting a close relationship to the family Acrolepidae while others have suggested that it could be close to Birgeriidae. Both of these have been argued against though the exact placement, outside of being close to other fish that lived at the same time, is unknown. Brazilichthys would have lived in large coastal lakes in an arid to semi-arid environment alongside a few temnospondyls such as Prionosuchus along with a number of shark genera.

== History and Classification ==
Brazilichthys was first described by C. Barry Cox and P. Hutchinson in a 1901 publication that described new material from the Pedra De Fogo Formation in Northern Brazil, making it the first ray-finned fish to be described from the Parnaíba Basin. The holotype and only known specimen of the genus (DGM 1061-P) is an incomplete though articulated skull that is currently housed at the Museu de Ciências da Terra in Rio de Janeiro, Brazil. This paper, however, would only include a description of the external anatomy with this staying the case until a 2019 paper by Rodrigo T. Figueroa, Matt Friendman, and Valéria Gallo. This publication would redescribe the external anatomy of the skull along with described new internal features. Another paper on the genus would be published by Rodrigo T. Figueroa and James V. Andrews in 2022 which would look at how the upper and lower dentition of the genus would interact with one another.

=== Classification ===
Due to the lack of internal features described in the original publication, the phylogenetic position of Brazilichthys has been argued in multiple publications. The original 1901 paper by Cox and Hutchinson would suggest that the genus was close to the family Acrolepidae though would place it in its own family. Later, a 2009 paper by Carlo Romano and Winand Brinkmann would suggest that the genus would have been close to Birgeriidae. Both of these placements would be largely based on personal communications that the authors had before the papers were published. The 2019 redescription of the genus would reject both of these and instead place Brazilichthys as a stem actinopterygian more derived than members of the group from the Devonian.

== Description ==
The holotype skull of Brazilichthys is made up of most of the skull that is anterior to the opercular series with what is present measuring 80 millimetres (3.1 in) long and 42 millimetres (1.7 in) deep.

The skull roof of Brazilichthys is poorly preserved with fragmentary bones suggested be the frontal and parietal bones being the only parts of the material suggested to be that part of the skull roof. The front of the skull is generally more well preserved with a large nasal bone being present. Small notches are located at the anterior and posterior edges of the bone which would have been where the nasal openings would have been positioned. The circumorbital series is generally well preserved outside of what has been interpreted as the dermosphenotic by more recent authors. Though partially hidden by the nasal an premaxilla, the scleral ring of the fish is preserved. The ring is comparably large compared to the orbit though does generally have the same shape. Though the braincase of Brazilichthys is not preserved, bones associated with it such as the parasphenoid are found in the specimen. This bone was long with an inflated anterior end that would have most likely been in articulation with the ethmoid region of the braincase along with the vomers. The vomers would have been a part of the roof of the mouth but would not have possessed any teeth.

The most notable features of the skull of Brazilichthys are the upper and lower jaws along with the dentition. The maxilla and dentary are the largest bones that make up the upper and lower jaws respectively. The maxilla, as the size would suggest, a long bone with it going far past the eye which it changing shape as it passes the orbit. The premaxilla is much smaller than the maxilla, though still robust. Though not preserved, it can be assumed that the rostral bone would have made contact with the premaxilla. Under the orbit, the maxilla bends downwards only to expand when passed the opening. The dentary, similar to the maxilla, is very long with ornamentation similar but overall more robust towards the front of the bone. Other than the dentary, the angular and surangular are the only other external elements of the jaw that are present in the holotype though both are at least partially covered by the dentary. The endoskeletal bones such as the articular are only partially mineralized.

Both the upper and lower dentition are organized into two rows which are even present were the bones overlap one another. The inner tooth row would have been much larger than the smaller ones and were more widely spaced. Outside of the much larger size, the teeth of the inner row also differ due to them being curved with them being described as fangs in papers describing the dentition. These larger teeth are only seen on the maxilla and dentary bones with only the outer row being present in other teeth that make up the jaws. When the mouth of the fish would close, the upper fangs would overlay the dentary whereas the fangs on the lower dentition would fit into fenestrae found on the interior surface of the maxilla. Not every one of these fenestrae would have been inline with a fang, instead only every other fenestrae would be filled by a fang from the lower dentition when the mouth would close. Evidence of tooth replacement on the upper dentition can be seen through depressions present between the fangs which this being similar to what is seen in not only extinct genera but also modern day bichir and cutlassfish. The placement of the depressions along with the patterns of fenestrae on the maxilla suggests that the teeth would have been replaced in an alternate pattern both within the one side of the dentition but also between the sides. This meaning that the teeth would have been alternatively replaced on one side of the mouth and then the other rather than it happening on both sides at the same time. Similar styles of tooth replacement is also seen in some modern fish, namely in the family containing pacus and piranhas.

The gular bones present under the front half of the lower jaw were all around the same size though the median gulars are the only ones to possess a pit line on their surface. Behind the gulars, there are seven or more pairs of branchiostegal rays though they are largely poorly preserved. Similarly, the opercular series of Brazilichthys are also poorly preserved with the only bone present being the left opercle.Due to this bone, along with the rest of the series, being so poorly preserved, nothing can be said about the exact anatomy of the region. The hyoid of the fish is only partially preserved with only the left hyomandibula and the hypohyals being preserved. A number of bones part of the branchial arches are preserved with the epibranchials being short. In contrast to this, the ceratobranchials and hypobranchials are much longer with the ceratobranchials being U-shaped in cross section.

== Paleobiology ==
=== Paleoecology ===
Based on the presence of fangs within the upper and lower dentition along with the way that these teeth were replaced suggest that Brazilichthys was macropredatory. These trends are not only seen in the genus but other early actinopterygians such as Tegeolepis and Nematoptychius. However, these other fish lack the fenestrae seen in the maxilla of Brazilichthys, this would have stopped them from being able to completely close their mouths. Due to this difference, the 2022 paper by Figueroa and Andrews suggests that a better comparison would be to the predatory lobe-finned fish Onychodus. Similar to Brazilichthys, Onychodus would have been able to completely close its mouth though with a single groove along the maxilla rather than individual fenestrae.

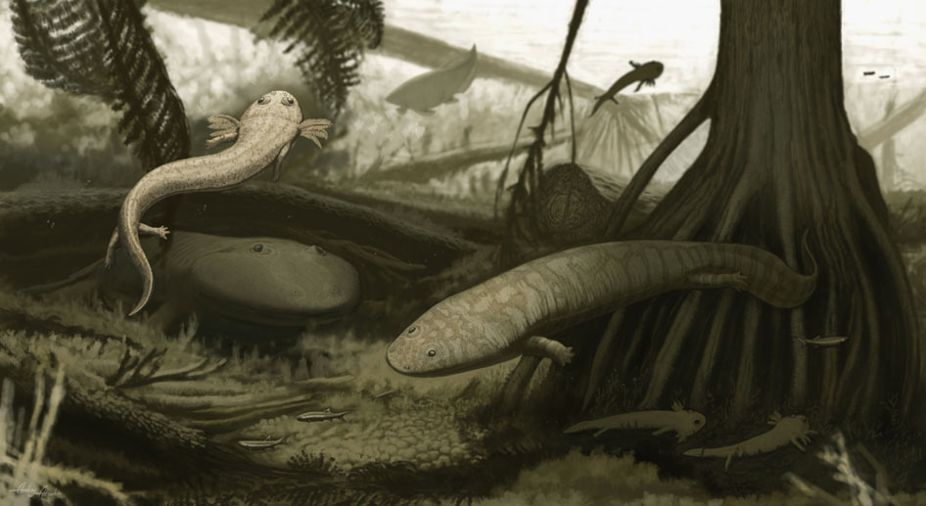
An art piece showing the aquatic fauna of the Pedra De Fogo Formation

=== Paleoenvironment ===
Brazilichthys was found in the sediments of the Pedra De Fogo Formation which is generally considered to represent a number of freshwater environments that would have been close to the coast. They would have most likely been all within a seasonally-wet floodplain system that contained rivers along with large and small lakes. These lakes would have gone through cycles of expanding and contracting as the climate would move between arid and semi-arid conditions that would continue to get more arid closer to the end of the Permian. Plant fossils have been found with these including multiple genera of gymnosperms, lycophytes, and "seed ferns". Most of the fauna known from the formation would have lived within the lakes alongside Brazilichthys, such as the giant temnospondyl Prionosuchus and a number of shark genera including Sphenacanthus and Bythiacanthus. There are, however, a few more terrestrial animals known from the formation such as the captorhinid Captorhinikos and the reptile Karutia.
