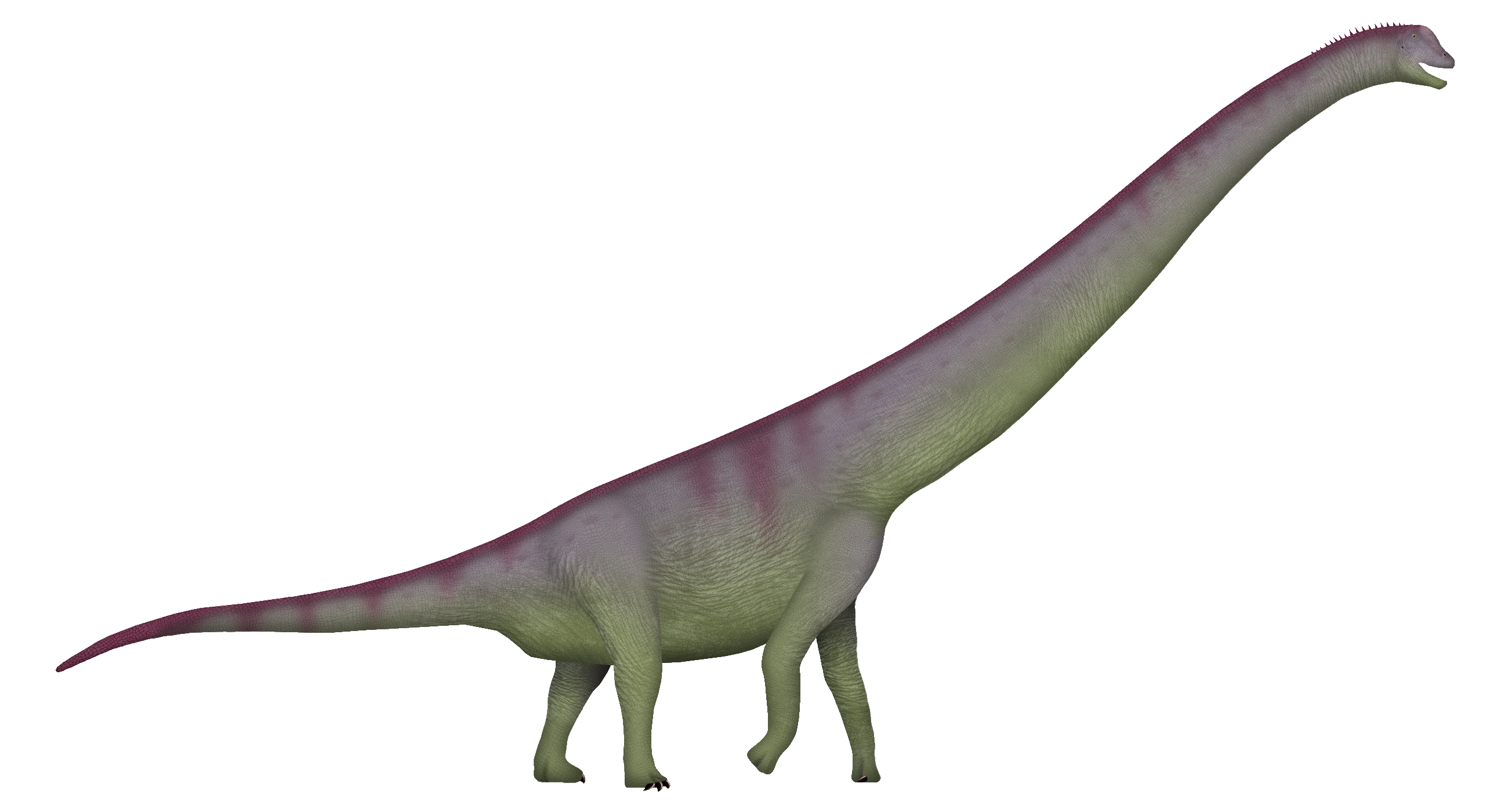
- Restoration

Scientific classification
- Kingdom: Animalia
- Phylum: Chordata
- Class: Reptilia
- Clade: Dinosauria
- Clade: Saurischia
- Clade: †Sauropodomorpha
- Clade: †Sauropoda
- Clade: †Macronaria
- Clade: †Titanosauriformes
- Clade: †Somphospondyli
- Genus: †Garumbatitan
- Species: †G. morellensis

Binomial name
- †Garumbatitan morellensis Mocho et al., 2023

= Garumbatitan =

Garumbatitan Temporal range: Early Cretaceous, Barremian

Genus of somphospondylan sauropod dinosaurs

Garumbatitan (meaning "Garumba giant") is an extinct genus of somphospondylan sauropod dinosaur from the Early Cretaceous Arcillas de Morella Formation of Spain. The genus contains a single species, G. morellensis, known from multiple partial skeletons.

== Discovery and naming ==
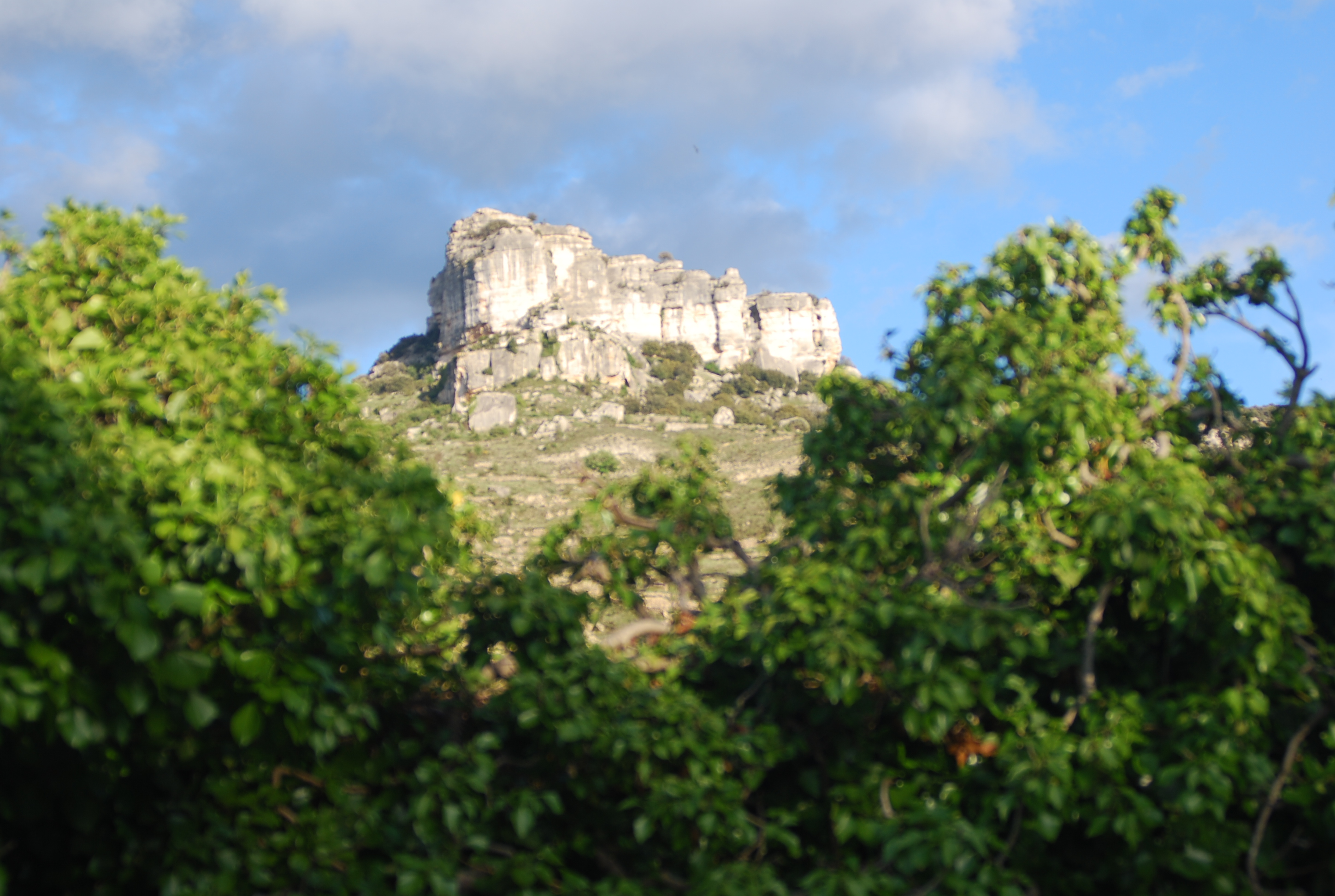
Mola de la Garumba, the mountain near the type locality and namesake of Garumbatitan

In 1998, Miquel G. Fígols discovered the Sant Antoni de la Vespa fossil site of the Arcillas de Morella Formation in sediments of the Maestrat Basin near the city of Morella in Castelló, Spain. The Garumbatitan fossil material was subsequently unearthed during field expeditions in 2005 and 2008. The known fossils belong to multiple individuals of different sizes. The holotype, which constitutes the remains of the largest individual, includes a sequence of articulated cervical and dorsal vertebrae, a partial dorsal centrum, ribs, caudal vertebrae, chevrons, an interclavicle, both femora, tibiae, and fibulae, the right astragalus, most of the right pes, and two metatarsals. Some of the bones, including the cervical/dorsal vertebrae sequence some ribs, caudal vertebrae, chevrons, an incomplete ilium, and the left femur, tibia, and fibula, are still unprepared. Additional fossil material belonging to a smaller individual was found associated with the holotype, including ribs, both pubes, and two nearly complete hindlimbs with significant overlapping material with the holotype. These bones were assigned as a paratype specimen. Three left metatarsals and two left pedal phalanges were also referred to Garumbatitan. Additional bones belonging to smaller specimens indicate that the combined remains of Garumbatitan represent at least four individuals.

The fossil material was first announced in a 2016 abstract, followed by a publication in 2017 by Mocho et al., which described it as an "indeterminate titanosauriform".

In 2023, Mocho et al. described Garumbatitan morellensis as a new genus and species of somphospondylan sauropod based on these fossil remains. The generic name, "Garumbatitan ", combines a reference to "Mola de la Garumba", one of the highest peaks in the region, with the word "titan", a common suffix for the names of large sauropods, referencing the pre-Olympian gods of Greek mythology. The specific name, "morellensis", refers to the Arcillas de Morella Formation, as well as the nearby town of Morella where some of the first Spanish dinosaur remains were discovered, in addition to the remains of Garumbatitan.

== Description ==
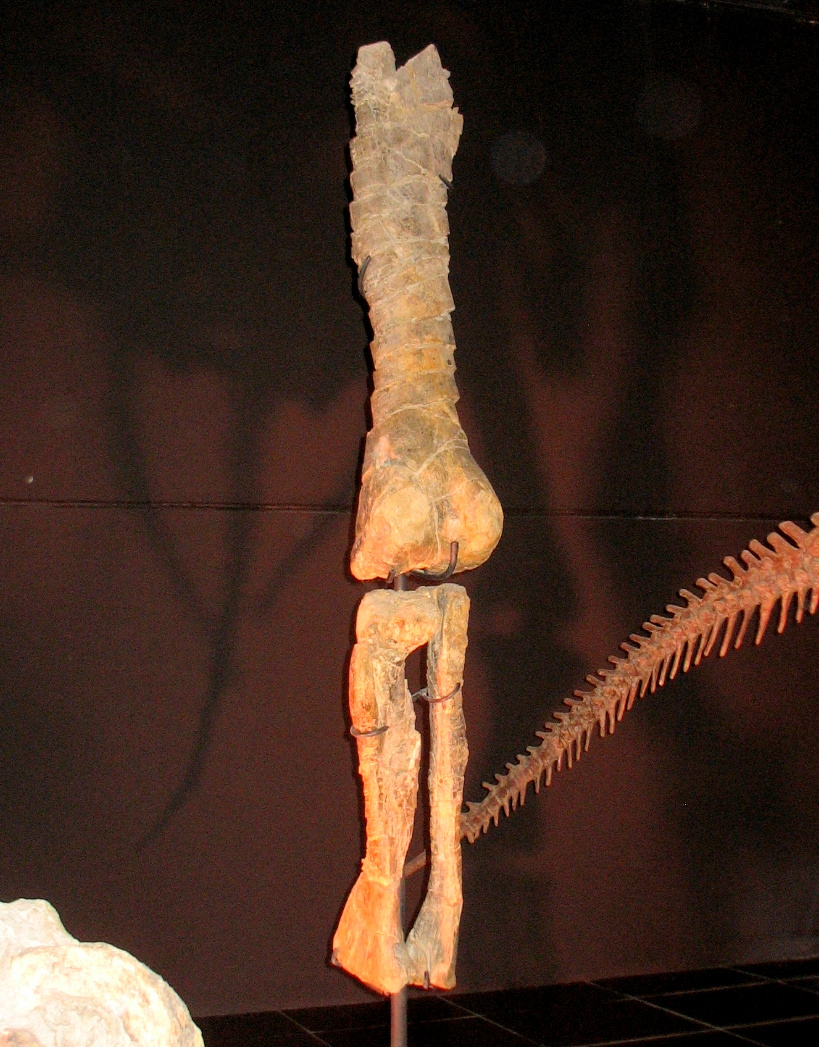
Leg bones of the closely related Tastavinsaurus

Many of the unique features of Garumbatitan are in its foot structure. These include the absence of a calcaneum, slender metatarsals with the first and fifth being shorter, a reduced ungual (claw) on the third toe, and the lack of toe bones for the fifth digit (a feature shared with titanosaurs). Furthermore, the femur of Garumbatitan had a well-developed lateral bulge which was possibly more pronounced than in any other sauropod. The tibia length is 64% of the femur length. In the related Tastavinsaurus, the tibia is 55% the length of the femur. The fibula of Garumbatitan is straight and robust, compared to the more curved fibula of Tastavinsaurus.

== Classification ==
A preliminary review of the Garumbatitan fossil material suggested that the taxon may have affinities to the 'Laurasiformes' within Somphosponyli. However, this clade is problematic, as several studies have recovered it within various locations within Macronaria, with a drastically varying composition, or to be an unsupported paraphyletic group. Mocho et al. (2023) recovered Garumbatitan as a basal somphospondylan member of the macronarian clade Titanosauriformes, failing to find support for the laurasiform clade. Their phylogenetic analyses placed Garumbatitan as more derived than Dongbeititan, but more basal than Tastavinsaurus. The results of their analyses are shown in the cladogram below:

- Macronaria
  - - Oceanotitan
    - Aragosaurus
  - - Galvesaurus
    - Titanosauriformes
      - Brachiosauridae
      - Somphospondyli
        - Dongbeititan
        - - Garumbatitan
          - - Tastavinsaurus
            - - Cloverly titanosauriform
              - Ligabuesaurus
              - Paluxysaurus
              - Sauroposeidon
              - Padillasaurus
              - - - - Angolatitan
                    - Chubutisaurus
                  - - Baotianmansaurus
                    - Huanghetitan
                    - Europatitan
                - - - Erketu
                    - Gobititan
                    - Huanghetitan ruyangensis
                  - - Wintonotitan
                    - - Euhelopodidae
                      - - Titanosauria

Garumbatitan may be the sister taxon of the Brazilian titanosauriform Dasosaurus.

== Paleoenvironment ==
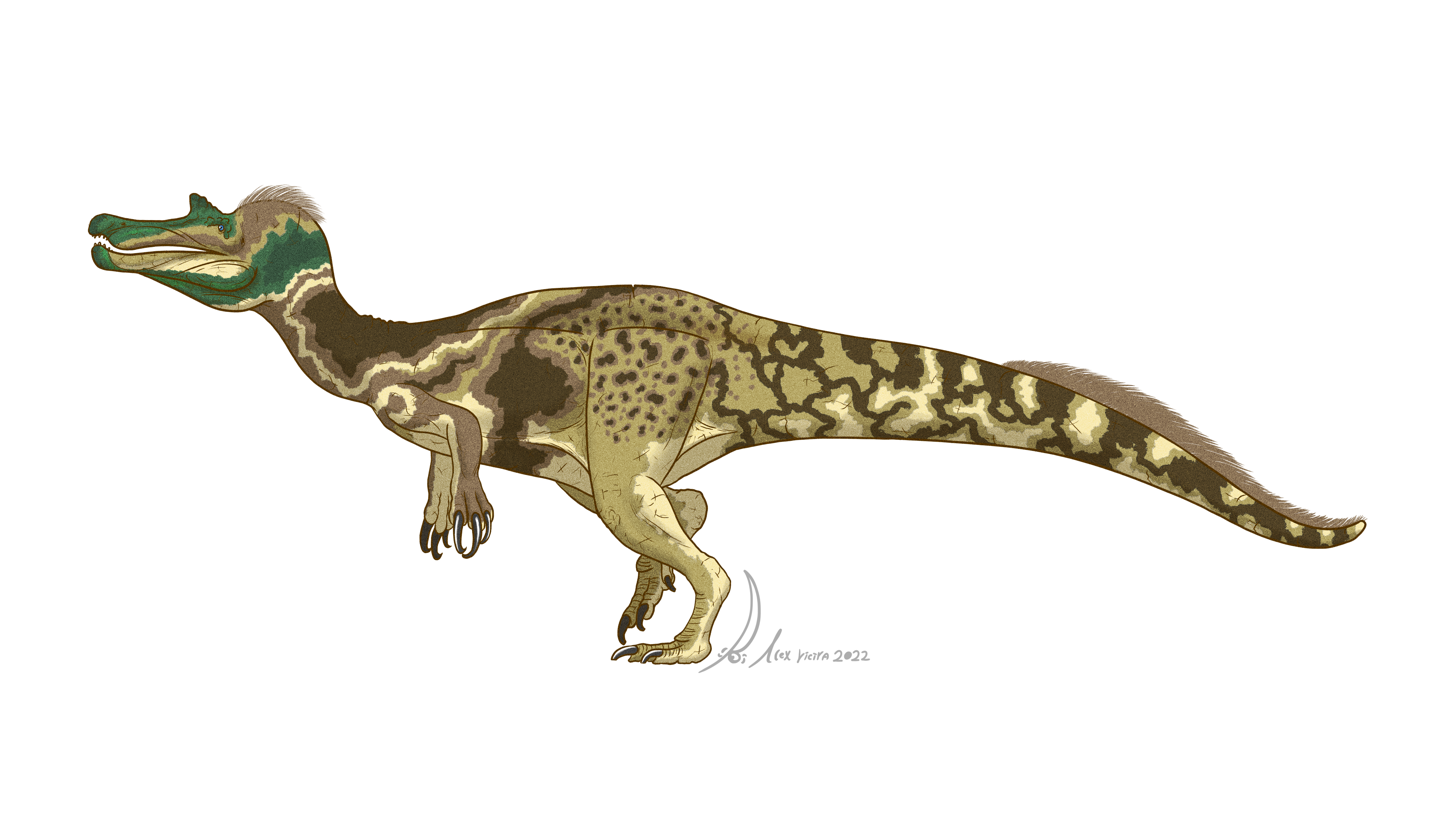
Life restoration of the contemporary Vallibonavenatrix

The Garumbatitan holotype was discovered in layers of the Arcillas de Morella Formation, which dates to the late Barremian age of the Early Cretaceous period. The styracosternan ornithopods Morelladon, Iguanodon bernissartensis, and cf. Mantellisaurus, as well as the spinosaurid theropods Vallibonavenatrix and Protathlitis have also been named from the formation. Two turtle taxa (Brodiechelys royoi and Eodortoka), an unnamed leptocleidid plesiosaur, and indeterminate titanosauriform remains that are distinct from Garumbatitan have also been described.
