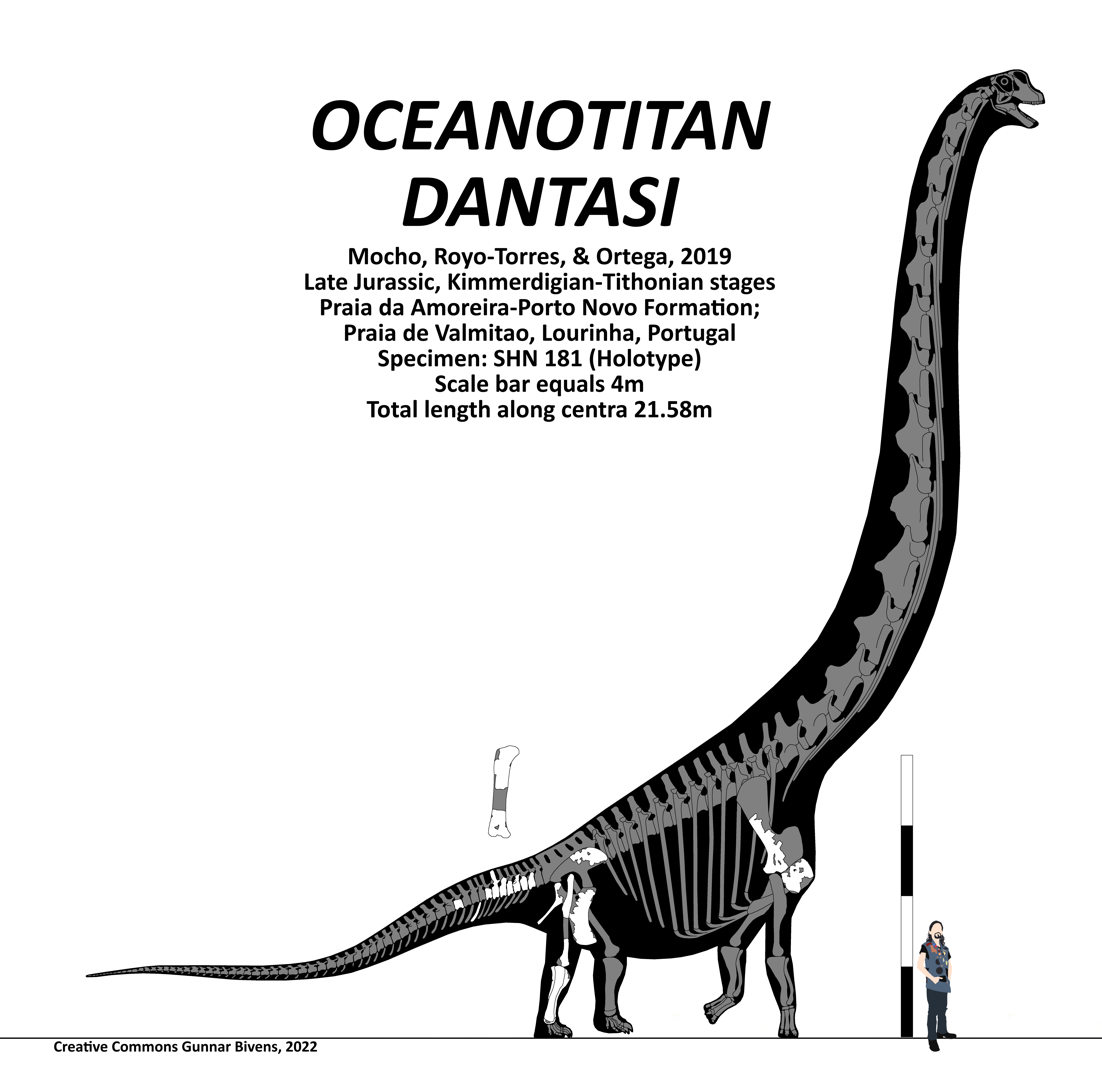
- Skeletal reconstruction with known material in white

Scientific classification
- Kingdom: Animalia
- Phylum: Chordata
- Class: Reptilia
- Clade: Dinosauria
- Clade: Saurischia
- Clade: †Sauropodomorpha
- Clade: †Sauropoda
- Clade: †Macronaria
- Clade: †Camarasauromorpha
- Clade: †Titanosauriformes
- Genus: †Oceanotitan; Mocho, Moyo-Torres & Ortega, 2019
- Species: †O. dantasi

Binomial name
- †Oceanotitan dantasi Mocho, Moyo-Torres & Ortega, 2019

= Oceanotitan =

Oceanotitan Temporal range: Late Jurassic, 149 Ma

Extinct genus of dinosaurs

Oceanotitan (meaning "ocean giant") is a genus of sauropod dinosaur known from the Upper Jurassic (latest Kimmeridgian stage, about 149 million years ago) Lourinhã Formation of Portugal. It is represented by a single specimen consisting of several tail vertebrae and appendicular bones. It contains one species, Oceanotitan dantasi. Oceanotitan is classified as possibly one of the earliest members of the Somphospondyli, a group of sauropods that includes the titanosaurs.

== Discovery and naming ==
The holotype and only specimen of Oceanotitan, SHN 181, is stored at the Sociedade de História Natural, in Torres Vedras, Portugal. It was discovered at the coastal cliffs of Praia de Valmitão in Lourinhã, by a private collector who donated his collection to the municipality of Torres Vedras. The rocks that it was found in correspond to the Praia da Amoreira-Porto Novo Member of the Lourinha Formation, dating to the latest Kimmeridgian stage of the Late Jurassic, about 149 Ma. Its type locality is just a few meters north of where the holotype of Lusovenator was collected.

Oceanotitan was initially described in a 2016 doctoral thesis and, in 2017, was reported as an indeterminate macronarian while still in preparation. It was formally described in 2019 by Pedro Mocho, the author of the thesis, and colleagues. The generic name Oceanotitan ("ocean giant") derives its name from oceanus, the Latin word for ocean, since it was found at the base of a cliff overlooking the Atlantic Ocean, and the giant Titans from Greek mythology. The specific name dantasi honors the Portuguese paleontologist Pedro Dantas, who was a major contributor to Portuguese vertebrate paleontology towards the end of the 20th century.

== Description ==
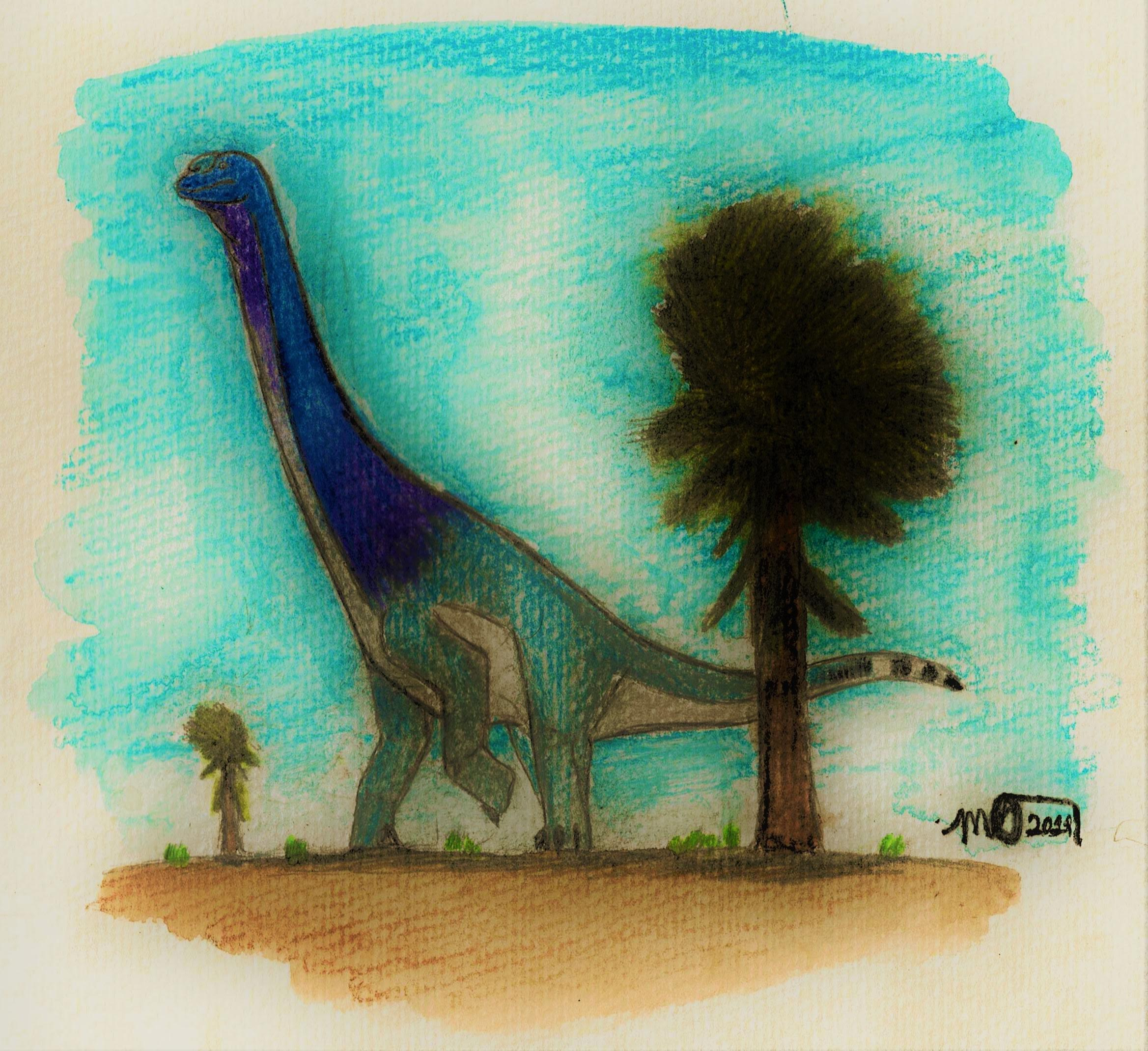
Speculative reconstruction of O. dantasi in its habitat

Oceanotitan possesses unique features that separate it from all other macronarians, which are: a sagittal groove on the top of the first caudal vertebral neural spines; lateral depressions on the edges of the anterior and middle caudal vertebral neural spines while being dorsally connected in the posterior-most ones; and an elliptical concavity on the bottom of the scapular blade, near the acromion process. Total body size is uncertain due to lack of remains.

== Classification ==
In its initial description, Oceanotitan was considered a definite titanosauriform and a possible somphospondylan, the latter placement supported by one of the two phylogenetic analyses conducted in the paper. In the 2024 description of the somphospondylan Garumbatitan, Oceanotitan was included in the phylogenetic analysis. A modified cladogram of the analysis is shown below.

- Macronaria
  - - Oceanotitan
    - Aragosaurus
  - - Galvesaurus
    - Titanosauriformes
      - Brachiosauridae
      - Somphospondyli
        - Dongbeititan
        - - Garumbatitan
          - - Tastavinsaurus
            - - Cloverly titanosauriform
              - Ligabuesaurus
              - Paluxysaurus
              - Sauroposeidon
              - Padillasaurus
              - - - - Angolatitan
                    - Chubutisaurus
                  - - Baotianmansaurus
                    - Huanghetitan
                    - Europatitan
                - - - Erketu
                    - Gobititan
                    - Huanghetitan ruyangensis
                  - - Wintonotitan
                    - - Euhelopodidae
                      - - Titanosauria

== Paleoecology ==
The Praia da Amoreira-Porto Novo Member of the Lourinha Formation, from where Oceanotitan is known, was deposited in a river system, but not a marine environment, based on the species of palynomorph found there. Its flora and fauna are similar to the Morrison Formation in the United States, and the Tendaguru Formation in Tanzania. Oceanotitan lived alongside species of the predatory theropods Ceratosaurus, Compsognathus, Lourinhanosaurus, Torvosaurus, and an indeterminate species of abelisaurid, the sauropods Lourinhasaurus, Lusotitan, Zby and an indeterminate species of diplodocid, the stegosaur Miragaia, and the ornithopod Hypsilophodon.
