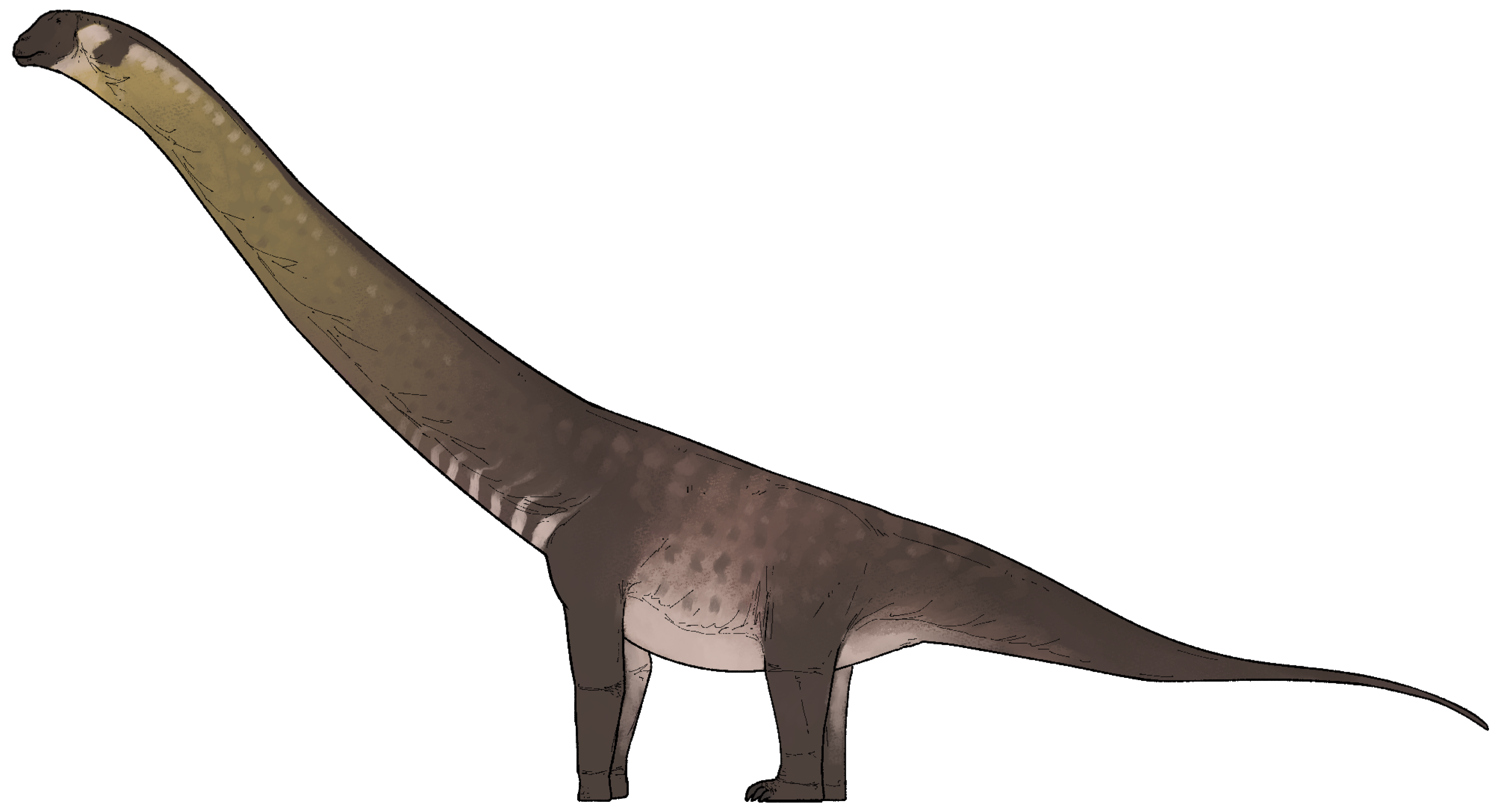
- Speculative life restoration

Scientific classification
- Kingdom: Animalia
- Phylum: Chordata
- Class: Reptilia
- Clade: Dinosauria
- Clade: Saurischia
- Clade: †Sauropodomorpha
- Clade: †Sauropoda
- Clade: †Macronaria
- Clade: †Somphospondyli
- Genus: †Dasosaurus; Mayer et al., 2026

Type species
- †Dasosaurus tocantinensis Mayer et al., 2026

= Dasosaurus =

Dasosaurus Temporal range: Early Cretaceous, Aptian

Genus of sauropod dinosaur

Dasosaurus is an extinct genus of somphospondylan sauropod dinosaur known from the Early Cretaceous (Aptian) Itapecuru Formation of Brazil. The genus contains a single species, Dasosaurus tocantinensis. Its morphology is similar to the titanosauriform Garumbatitan, known from the Early Cretaceous of Spain.

The Dasosaurus holotype belongs to a medium-to-large sauropod, approximately 20 metres (66 ft) long. It resembled its larger relative, Garumbatitan.

== Discovery and naming ==
The Dasosaurus fossil material, CPHNAM VT 1600, was discovered by Daniel Ribeiro da Silva, an archeologist, in outcrops of the Itapecuru Formation in Davinópolis, Maranhão, Brazil. da Silva found the fossils exposed at the base of an ~8 m (26 ft)-high slope. The discovery was announced in 2021, at which point the remains were identified as belonging to a new titanosaur taxon. The specimen consists of phalanges, ribs, an ulna, radius, tibia, fibula, femur, pubis, ischium, and at least ten disarticulated caudal vertebrae. These remains were briefly put on public display in 2025 at the Center for Research and Natural History and Archaeology of Maranhão.

In 2026, Elver L. Mayer and colleagues described Dasosaurus tocantinensis as a new genus and species of somphospondylan sauropod based on these fossil remains, establishing CPHNAM VT 1600 as the holotype specimen. The generic name, Dasosaurus, combines the Greek words dasos, meaning 'forest'—in reference to the type locality in Amazônia Legal, a division of Brazil that includes the majority of Amazon rainforest—and saurus, meaning 'lizard'. The specific name, tocantinensis, is after Tocantins, a state near Maranhão, where the type locality is situated.

== Classification ==
To test the affinities and relationships of Dasosaurus, Mayer et al. (2026) included it in an updated version of the phylogenetic matrix of Mocho et al. (2023). Their consensus tree resulting from an implied weighting analysis, shown in the cladogram below, achieved a better-resolved tree than their analysis using equal weights.

- Somphospondyli
  - Huanghetitan liujiaxiaensis
  - - Angolatitan
    - Dongbeititan
    - Wintonotitan
    - - Chubutisaurus
      - Padillasaurus
    - - - Cloverly titanosauriform
        - Paluxysaurus
        - Sauroposeidon
      - - Ligabuesaurus
        - - - Garumbatitan
            - Dasosaurus
          - - - Europatitan
              - Tastavinsaurus
            - - Euhelopodidae
              - Titanosauria
