= Arenactinia =

Scientific classification
- Kingdom: Animalia
- Phylum: Cnidaria
- Subphylum: Anthozoa
- Class: Hexacorallia
- Order: Actiniaria
- Family: incertae sedis
- Genus: †Arenactinia; Barroso et al., 2025
- Species: †A. ipuensis

Binomial name
- †Arenactinia ipuensis Barroso et al., 2025
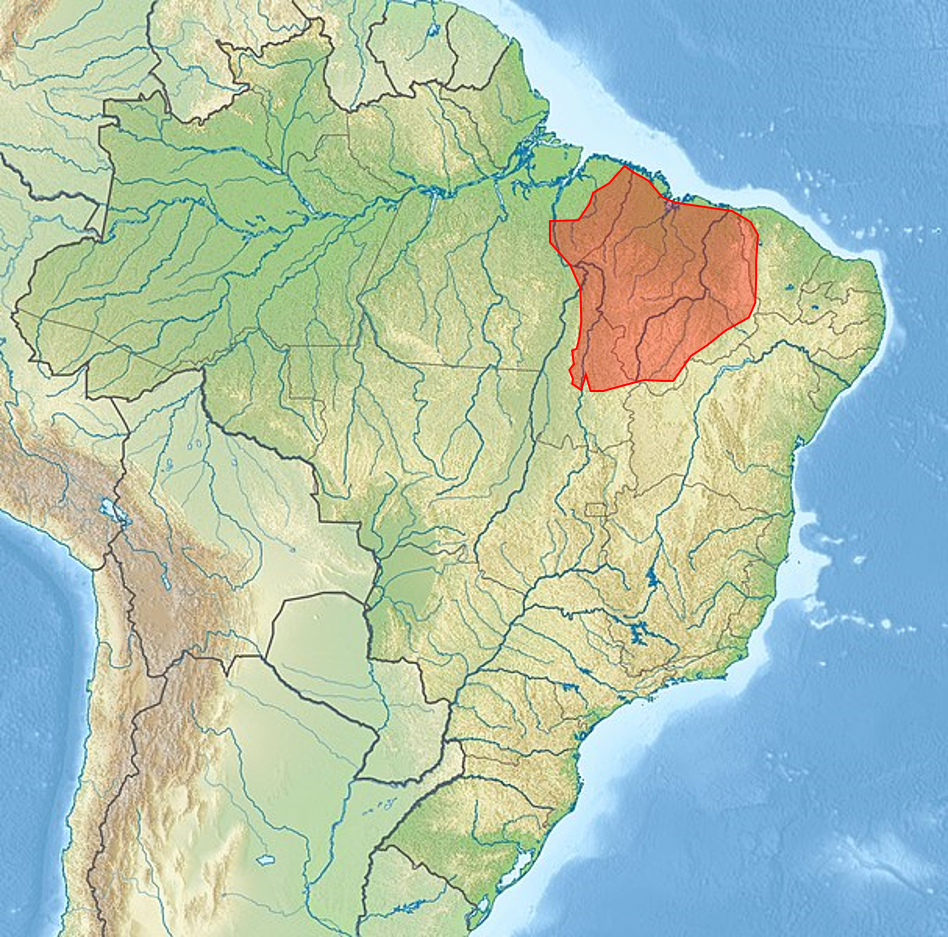
- Parnaíba Basin

Genus of sea anemones

Arenactinia is a genus of sea anemone that lived during the early Silurian period. Its early appearance suggest that this genus may be related to the adaptive radiation of marine ecosystems following the Late Ordovician Extinction. This genus contains one species, Arenactinia ipuensis.

It was discovered in South America in the Ipu formation in the Parnaiba Basin of Brazil.

== Description ==
The body shapes of Arenactina can be discoidal, conical, cylindrical, flattened or bipartite. The body is divided into a cylindrical column and an expanded base. This species processes an oral disk with discrete tentacles. This gives Arenactina a similar body shape to modern sea anemone that burrow into soft substrates.
