= Cyclostigma =

Cyclostigma Temporal range: Emsian

Scientific classification
- Kingdom: Plantae
- Clade: Tracheophytes
- Clade: Lycophytes
- Class: Lycopodiopsida
- Genus: †Cyclostigma; Haught., nom. cons.

Extinct genus of spore-bearing plants

Cyclostigma is a genus of extinct plants belonging to the Lycopodiopsida (lycopsids).

== Taxonomy ==
Cyclostigma Haught. was first used by Samuel Haughton in 1859 for the type species C. kiltorkense. The name Cyclostigma has been used for a genus no fewer than four times. Three are synonyms:

- Cyclostigma Hochst. ex Endl. is a synonym of Voacanga Thouars. This is the oldest name, dating from 1842, and so would normally have priority but Cyclostigma Haught. has been conserved against it.
- Cyclostigma Klotzsch is a synonym of Croton L.
- Cyclostigma Phil. is a synonym of Leptoglossis Benth.

Hao and Xue in 2013 listed Cyclostigma as a lycopsid.
