= Corda Formation =

Geologic formation in Tocantins, Brazil

- Stratigraphic range: Late Aptian-Early Albian; ~115–110 Ma
- Type: Geological formation
- Underlies: Sardinha Formation
- Overlies: Itapecuru Formation

Lithology
- Primary: Red sandstone

Location
- Coordinates: 5.7°S 47.5°W
- Approximate paleocoordinates: 5.1°S 14.8°W
- Region: Tocantins
- Country: Brazil
- Extent: Parnaíba Basin

Type section
- Named for: Corda River
- Corda Formation (Brazil)

The Corda Formation is a red sandstone geologic formation in the Parnaíba Basin in Tocantins, Brazil. It was formed during the Neoaptian to Eoalbian series of the Early Cretaceous.

Large-scale fossil sauropod tracks have been reported from the formation.

== Origin ==
The Corda Formation is characterized by reddish sandstones, that were probably deposited in windy deserts and fast flowing freshwater streams. Therefore, fossils are very rare.

== Occurrence ==
This formation outcrops in the central part of the Parnaíba Basin, between the mouth of the Araguaia River in the west the Parnaíba River in the east.

== Lithology ==
The Corda Formation consists largely of red sandstone, with very fine to medium grain size, rich in zeolites and iron oxide. Where whinstones are overlaying fragments of this rock are also present. Typical structures of wind dunes (cross bedding, ripples, and grain flow) are common. This is consistent with deposition in a desert system.

== See also ==
- List of dinosaur-bearing rock formations
- Sauropod tracks
- Romualdo Formation, contemporaneous fossiliferous formation of the Araripe Basin
- Itapecuru Formation, contemporaneous fossiliferous formation of the São Luis and Parnaíba Basins
