= Itapecuru Formation =

Geological formation in Brazil

- Stratigraphic range: Aptian-Cenomanian; ~120–95 Ma
- Type: Geological formation
- Underlies: Alluvium and Corda Formation
- Overlies: Codó, Grajaú and Piauí Formations
- Thickness: up to 2,000 m (6,600 ft) in São Luís Basin; 700 m (2,300 ft) in Parnaíba Basin

Lithology
- Primary: Mudstone, sandstone
- Other: Breccia, diamictite

Location
- Coordinates: 3°23′30″S 44°21′30″W
- Approximate paleocoordinates: 8.6°S 15.9°W
- Region: Itapecuru Mirim; Maranhão
- Country: Brazil
- Extent: São Luís and Parnaíba Basins

Type section
- Named for: Itapecuru Mirim
- Itapecuru Formation (Brazil)

The Itapecuru Formation is a geological formation in Itapecuru Mirim, Maranhão, Brazil.

It was formed during the Aptian to Albian stages of the Early Cretaceous. Dinosaur remains are among the fossils that have been recovered from the formation.

== Fossil content ==
Color key: Taxon / Reclassified taxon / Taxon falsely reported as present / Dubious taxon or junior synonym / Ichnotaxon / Ootaxon / Morphotaxon

Notes
Uncertain or tentative taxa are in small text
~~crossed out~~ taxa are discredited.

=== Dinosaurs ===
==== Sauropods ====
Sauropods of the Itapecuru Formation
Genus	Species	Location	Stratigraphic position	Material	Notes	Images
Amazonsaurus	A. maranhensis				A rebbachisaurid sauropod	Amazonsaurus Dasosaurus
Dasosaurus	D. tocantinensis		Lower	A partial skeleton	A somphospondylian sauropod	Amazonsaurus Dasosaurus
Sauropoda indet.	Indeterminate					Amazonsaurus Dasosaurus

==== Theropods ====
Theropods of the Itapecuru Formation
Genus	Species	Location	Stratigraphic position	Material	Notes	Images
Abelisauridae Indet.	Indeterminate				A abelisaurid theropod	
Giganotosaurini Indet.	Indeterminate			Tooth	A giganotosaurin carcharodontosaurine; closely related to Giganotosaurus carolinii and Mapusaurus rosae.	
Theropoda indet.	Indeterminate					

=== Crocodylomorphs ===
Crocodylomorphs of the Itapecuru Formation
Genus	Species	Location	Stratigraphic position	Material	Notes	Images
Candidodon	C. itapecuruense				A candidodontid notosuchian	

=== Mosasaurs ===
Mosasaurs of the Itapecuru Formation
Genus	Species	Location	Stratigraphic position	Material	Notes	Images
Mosasauridae Indet.	Indeterminate				An indeterminate mosasaurid	

=== Plesiosaurs ===
Plesiosaurs of the Itapecuru Formation
Genus	Species	Location	Stratigraphic position	Material	Notes	Images
Brachaucheninae Indet.	Indeterminate				A brachauchenine thalassophonean	

=== Turtles ===
Turtles of the Itapecuru Formation
Genus	Species	Location	Stratigraphic position	Material	Notes	Images
Araripemys	A. barretoi				A araripemydid side-necked turtle	
Itapecuruemys	I. amazoniensis				A cearachelyin bothremydine	

=== Fish ===
Fishes of the Itapecuru Formation
Genus	Species	Location	Stratigraphic position	Material	Notes	Images
Arganodus	A. tiguidiensis				A arganodontid lungfish	
Ceratodus	C. africanus				A ceradodontid lungfish	
Mawsonia	M. gigas				A mawsoniid coelacanth	

== See also ==
- Geologic formations of Brazil
- List of dinosaur-bearing rock formations
