= Leptoglossis =

Scientific classification
- Kingdom: Plantae
- Clade: Tracheophytes
- Clade: Angiosperms
- Clade: Eudicots
- Clade: Asterids
- Order: Solanales
- Family: Solanaceae
- Genus: Leptoglossis; Benth.

Genus of plants

Leptoglossis is a genus of flowering plants belonging to the family Solanaceae.

Its native range is Peru to Argentina.

== Species ==
Species:

- Leptoglossis albiflora (I.M.Johnst.) Hunz. & Subils
- Leptoglossis darcyana Hunz. & Subils
- Leptoglossis ferreyraei Hunz. & Subils
- Leptoglossis linifolia (Miers) Benth. & Hook.f. ex Griseb.
- Leptoglossis lomana (Diels) Hunz.
- Leptoglossis schwenckioides Benth.
