= Davinópolis, Maranhão =

Coordinates: 05°33′S 47°26′W

- Municipality
- Flag Coat of arms
- Interactive map of Davinópolis, Maranhão
- Country: Brazil
- Region: Nordeste
- State: Maranhão
- Mesoregion: Oeste Maranhense

Population (2020)
  - Total: 12,916
- Time zone: UTC−3 (BRT)

Davinópolis, Maranhão is a municipality in the state of Maranhão in the Northeast region of Brazil.

== See also ==
- List of municipalities in Maranhão
