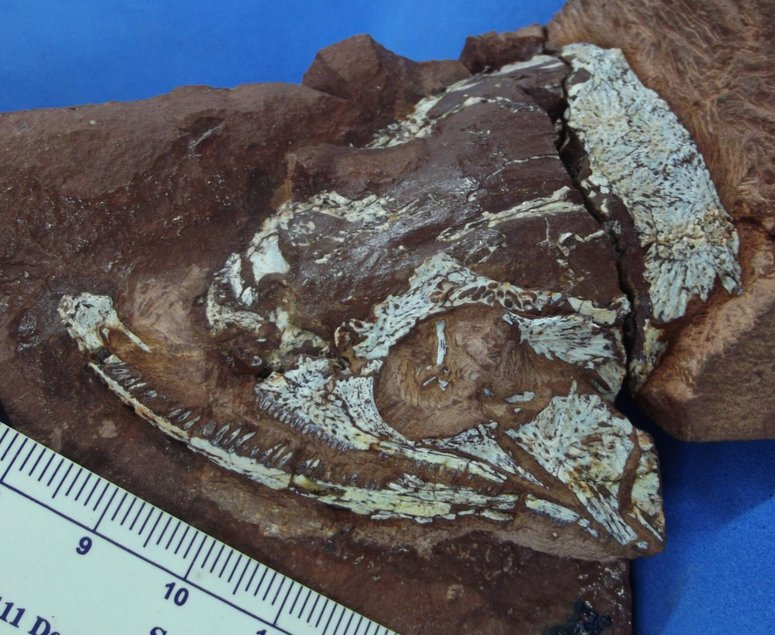

Scientific classification
- Kingdom: Animalia
- Phylum: Chordata
- Clade: Tetrapoda
- Order: †Temnospondyli
- Suborder: †Dvinosauria
- Genus: †Timonya; Cisneros et al., 2015

Type species
- †Timonya anneae Cisneros et al., 2015

= Timonya =

Timonya Temporal range: Early Permian, 278 Ma

Extinct genus of amphibians

Timonya is an extinct genus of temnospondyl amphibian represented by the type species Timonya anneae from the Early Permian of Brazil. Timonya is a basal member of a clade or evolutionary grouping of temnospondyls called Dvinosauria. It was named in 2015 on the basis of several specimens from the lower part of the Pedra de Fogo Formation in Parnaíba Basin, which is about 278 million years old. It was likely a small aquatic predator that inhabited lakes and wetland areas. During the Early Permian the center of tetrapod diversity was in the equatorial regions of the supercontinent Pangea, and Timonya was part of this fauna.
