= Gobititan =

Gobititan Temporal range: late Aptian, 123–113 Ma

Scientific classification
- Domain: Eukaryota
- Kingdom: Animalia
- Phylum: Chordata
- Clade: Dinosauria
- Clade: Saurischia
- Clade: †Sauropodomorpha
- Clade: †Sauropoda
- Clade: †Macronaria
- Clade: †Somphospondyli
- Genus: †Gobititan; You, Tang, and Luo, 2003

Type species
- Gobititan shenzhouensis You, Tang, and Luo, 2003

Extinct genus of dinosaurs

Gobititan is a genus of herbivorous sauropod dinosaur from the Aptian faunal stage of the Early Cretaceous. The name of this genus is derived from the Gobi Desert region and the Titans of Greek mythology, which is a reference to its large body size. The specific name shenzhouensis, is derived from "Shenzhou", an ancient name for China.

== Description ==
Gobititan can be distinguished from other titanosauriforms based on features of the caudal vertebrae. Compared with advanced titanosaurs, where the number of caudal vertebrae had been reduced to less than 35, Gobititan had a relatively high number of caudal vertebrae, which was interpreted as a basal trait. Gregory S. Paul estimated that Gobititan was 20 m (66 ft) long and weighed 20 metric tons (22 short tons).

== Discovery and naming ==
The genus is based on one partial skeleton, holotype IVPP 12579, which consists of a series of 41 caudal vertebrae and an incomplete left hindlimb. Its remains were recovered in the summer of 1999 at the "Middle Gray unit" (also known as the Xiagou Formation) of the Xinminbao Group in the Gongpoquan Basin in Gansu, China. The type species, Gobititan shenzhouensis was named and described by You, Tang and Luo in 2003 and was classified as a basal titanosaur. This specimen is housed in the collection of the Institute of Vertebrate Paleontology and Paleoanthropology, in Beijing, China.

== Classification ==
In its original description, Gobititan was considered to be a basal titanosaur closely related to Tangvayosaurus, suggesting that titanosaurs might have originated in Asia no later than the Early Cretaceous. However, based on the fact that the fifth digit is still present on the foot (a trait unknown in all other titanosaurs), more recent research has generally considered it to be a titanosauriform, more specifically a member of the Somphospondyli. Nevertheless, some analyses still recover Gobititan as a titanosaur.
