= Anisopleurodontis =

Anisopleurodontis Temporal range: Permian

Scientific classification
- Domain: Eukaryota
- Kingdom: Animalia
- Phylum: Chordata
- Class: Chondrichthyes
- Order: †Eugeneodontiformes
- Family: †incertae sedis
- Genus: †Anisopleurodontis da Silva Santos, 1994
- Species: †A. pricei

Binomial name
- †Anisopleurodontis pricei da Silva Santos 1994

Extinct genus of cartilaginous fish

Anisopleurodontis is a genus of prehistoric, shark-like holocephalan, the remains of which have been discovered in the Pedra de Fogo Formation of Brazil. There is one known species, A. pricei. As a member of the Holocephali, it is distantly related to modern chimaeras and ratfish.
