= Parnaíba Basin =

Cratonic sedimentary basin in Brazil

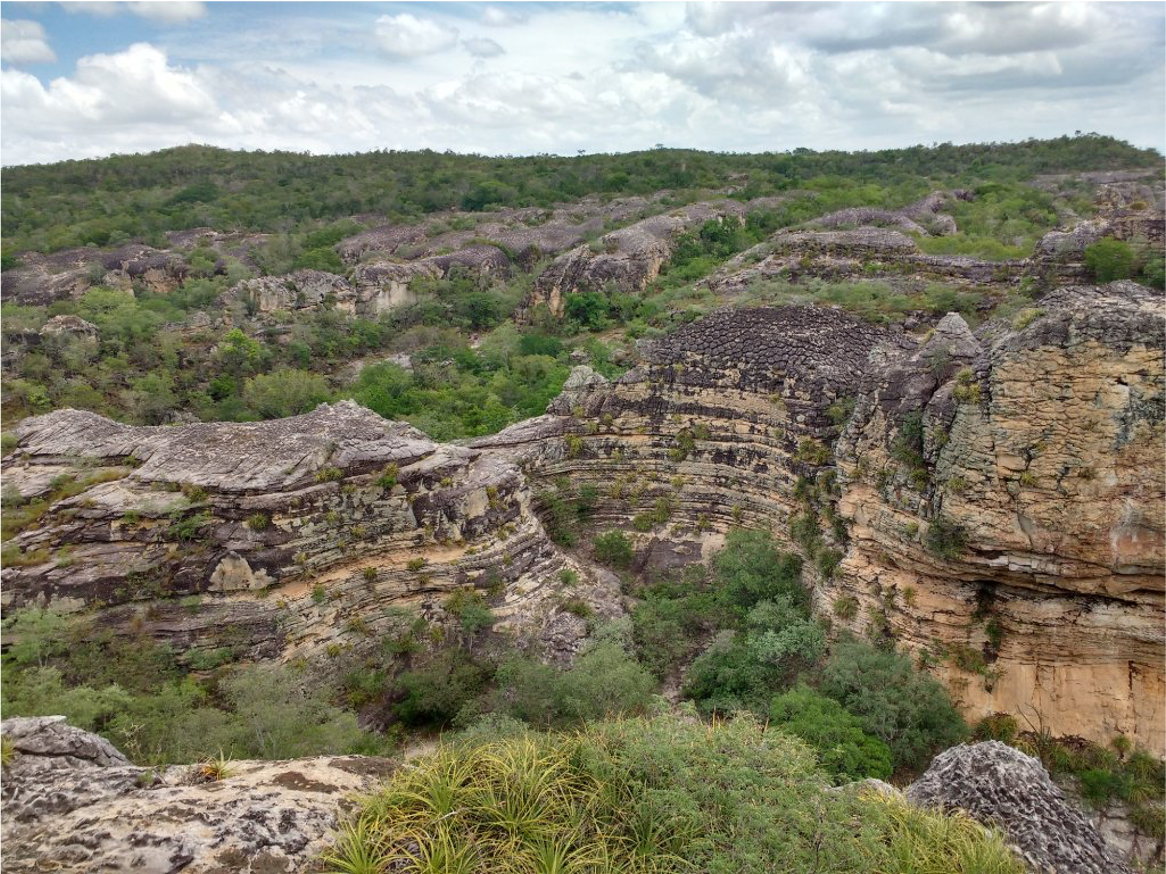
- Field view of the Parnaíba Basin in Piracuruca, State of Piauí, Brazil

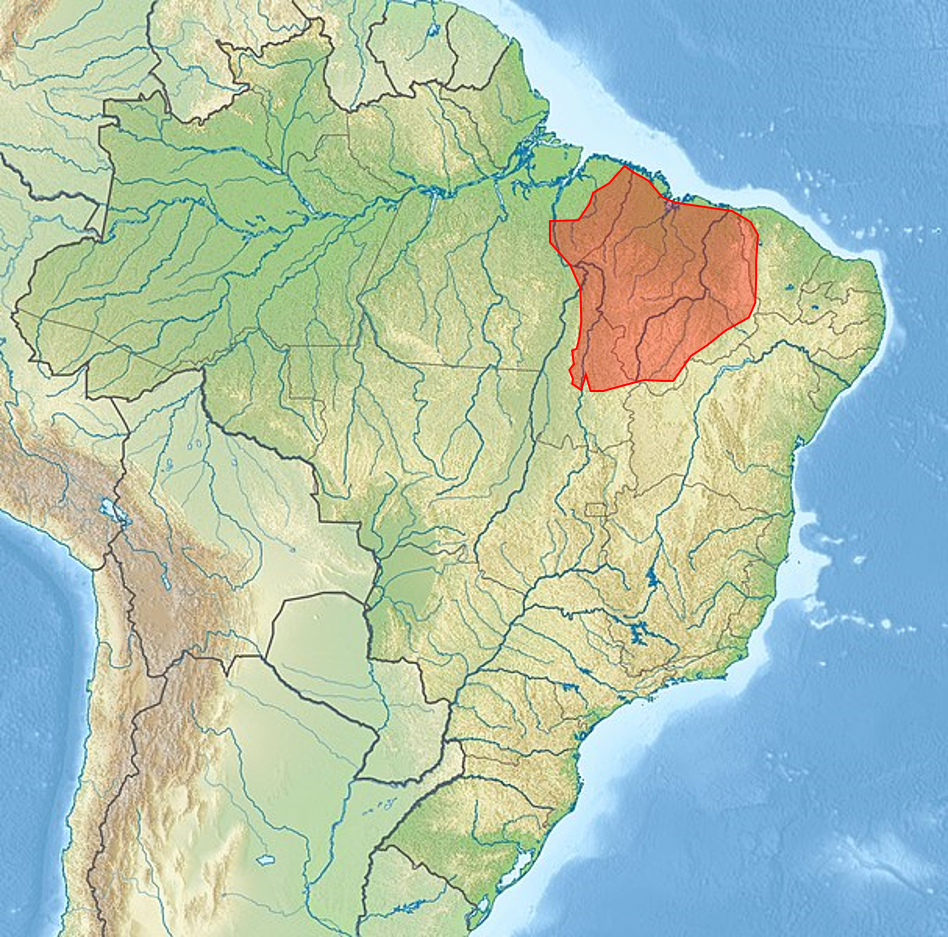
- Map view of the Parnaíba Basin in Brazil
- Coordinates: 06°28′00″S 45°35′00″W
- Region: North Region, Brazil, Northeast Region, Brazil
- Country: Brazil
- States: Pará, Maranhão, Piauí, Ceará, Tocantins
- Cities: Teresina, Palmas, Araguaína, Parnaíba

Characteristics
- On/Offshore: Onshore
- Boundaries: São Luís Craton (N), São Francisco Craton (SE), Borboremo Province (E), Amazonian Craton (W)
- Part of: Brazilian onshore basins
- Area: 665,888 km^{2} (257,101 sq mi)

Hydrology
- Rivers: Parnaiba River, Tocantins River

Geology
- Basin type: Cratonic basin
- Plate: South American
- Orogeny: Brasiliano orogeny
- Age: Paleozoic to recent
- Stratigraphy: Stratigraphy
- Fields: Gavião Real field, Gavião Branoc field, Gavião Vermelho field, Gavião Caboclo field, and the Gavião Azul field

The Parnaíba Basin (Portuguese: Bacia do Parnaíba) is a large cratonic sedimentary basin located in the North and Northeast portion of Brazil. About 50% of its area is in the state of Maranhão, and the other 50% is in the states of Pará, Piauí, Tocantins, and Ceará. It is one of the largest Paleozoic basins in the South American Platform. The basin has a roughly ellipsoidal shape, occupies over 600,000 km^{2}, and is composed of ~3.4 km of mainly Paleozoic sedimentary rock that overlies localized rifts.

The basin as named after the Parnaíba River, which is approximately 1,400 kilometres (870 mi) long, and runs relatively parallel to the major axis of the basin.

== Regional Setting ==
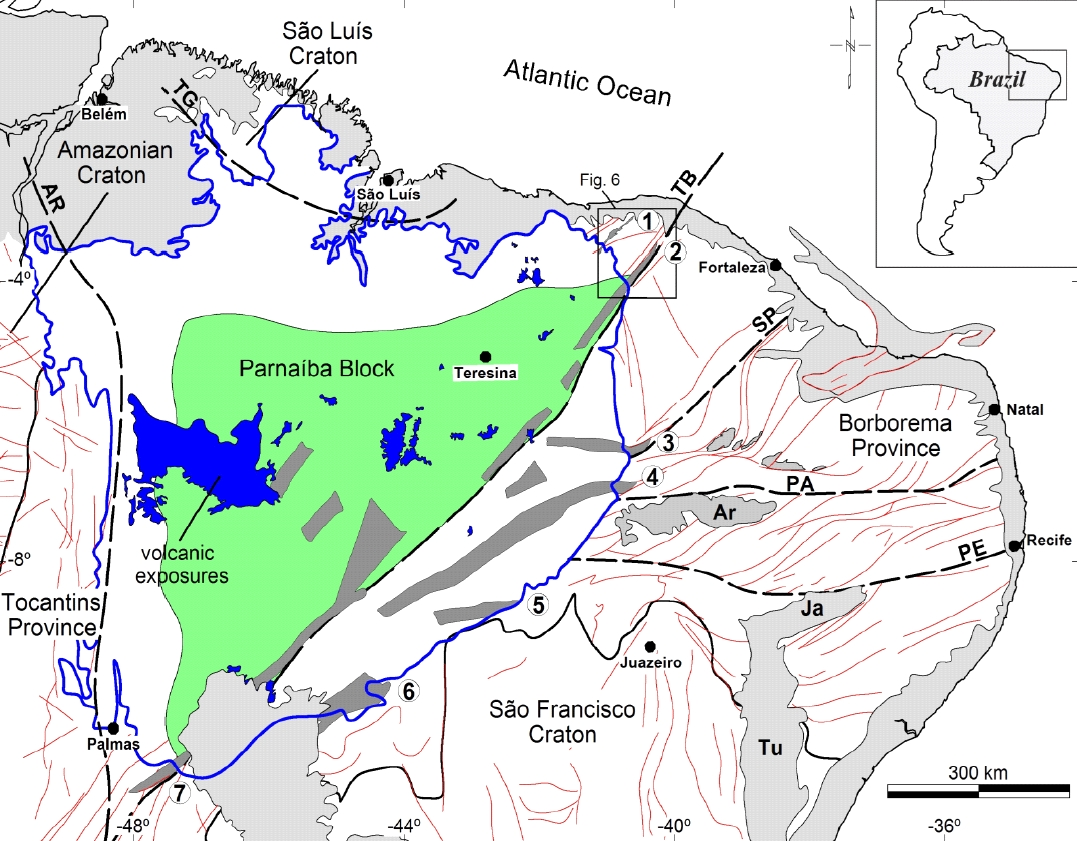
Regional map of the Parnaíba basin and its boundaries

It is located between the Amazonian Craton to the west and the São Francisco Craton to the south east. The São Luís Craton sits north of the basin and the Borborema Province is to the east. The basin currently covers a Precambrian basement composed of Archean to early Proterozoic cratonic blocks, Late Proterozoic Brasiliano/Pan-African fold belts and basement inliers.

The existence of a Parnaíba block was hypothesized from geophysical evidence, petrography, geochronology of the basement rocks, and from collisional tectonic models.

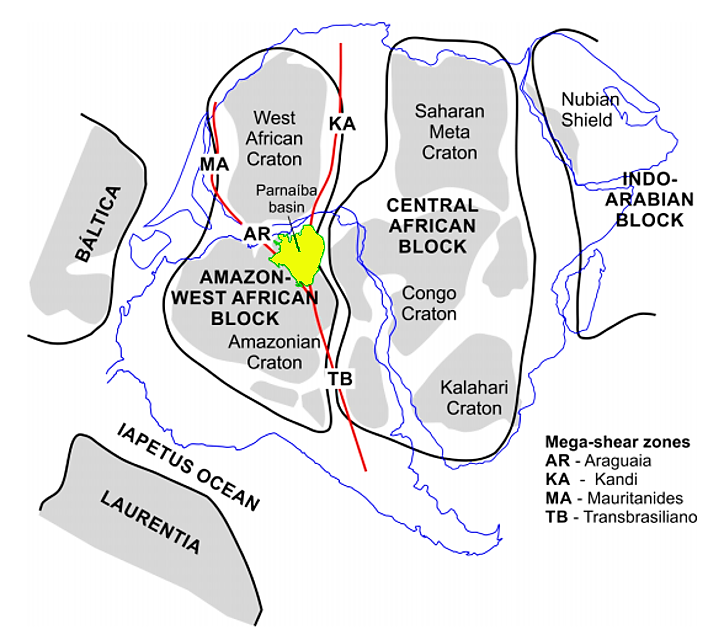
Location of the Parnaíba basin within a reconstruction of West Gondwana at ~540 Ma

It was regarded as one of the continental fragments inherited by the South American platform after the dispersal of the Rodinia supercontinent to form the Gondwana supercontinent. The São Francisco Craton and São Luis Craton existed before the opening of the Atlantic Ocean in Mesozoic times, were part of larger cratonic landmasses, and probably surrounded a central Parnaíba block presently concealed under the basin's sediments. To the west, the Araguaia suture zone represents the final Neoproterozoic collision between the Amazonian craton and the Parnaíba block and, to the east, the Transbrasiliano Lineament marks the border with the Borborema Province.

== Depositional History ==
Stratigraphy of the Parnaíba basin contains depositional sequences, varying in age from Silurian to Cretaceous, marked by a progressive change in depositional environment from marine to continental. Like many other cratonic basins, the Parnaíba Basin displays a polyphase sedimentary history. There are five distinct and recognizable tectonostratigraphic (TS) units that are separated by basin-wide unconformities that make up the area. These TS units include: the Riachão unit (TS-1), the Jaibaras unit (TS-2), the Parnaíba unit (TS-3), the Mearim unit (TS-4), and the Grajau unit (TS-5). The sedimentary rocks vary greatly throughout the stratigraphy of the basin and depsostional environment changes, and includes shale, siltstone, mudstone, sandstone, conglomerate, breccia, limestone, and more. Two magmatic pulses can be seen in the rock record, and are known as the Mosquito Formation and the Sardinha Formation. Most of the magmatic rocks are sub-alkaline tholeiitic basalts, and occur as dikes and sills mainly within the Silurian to Carboniferous and as magmatic flows in the Jurassic and, less commonly, in the Cretaceous.

=== Grajau Unit (TS-5) ===
- Cretaceous (deposition between ~120 and 95 million years ago)
- Comprises the Corda, Grajau, Codo, and Itapecuru Formations
- Deposition of near-shore, shallow marine, and fluviolacustrine clastic sediments has been attributed to subsidence associated with early opening of the South Atlantic

=== Sardinha Formation ===
- Middle Cretaceous (emergence between ~130 and 125 million years ago)
- Occur mainly as diabase dikes and sills and as minor basaltic flows with higher alkali content when compared to the other magmatic pulse in the basin, the Mosquito Formation
- Interpreted as a second phase of basaltic magmatism manifesting itself as extensive sills interlocking basin strata that is attributed to the early opening of the South Atlantic Ocean

=== Mearim Unit (TS-4) ===
- Late Jurassic (deposition between ~165 and 155 million years ago)
- Comprises the Pastos Bons Formation
- Deposition of sandstone in a sabkha environment that is restricted to the center of the basin and undergoes of central "sag"

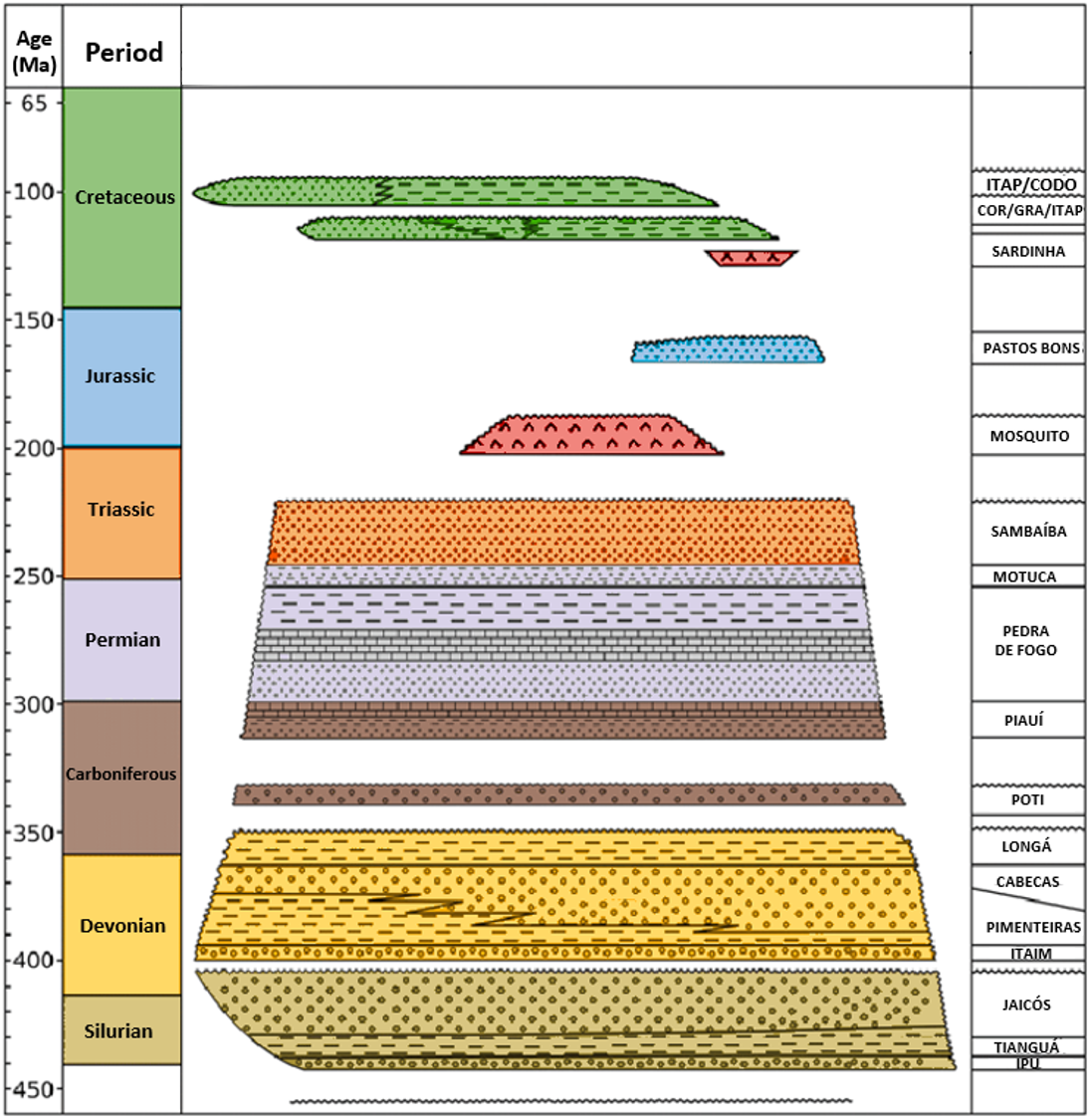
Stratigraphy of the Parnaíba unit, Mearim unit, and the Grajau unit in the Parnaíba Basin from 450 Ma to 65 Ma

=== Mosquito Formation ===
- Early Jurassic (emergence between ~205 and 185 million years ago)
- Formed mainly by lava flows that are occasionally interbedded with sandstones with lower alkali content when compared to the other magmatic pulse in the basin, the Sardinha Formation
- Interpreted as a phase of extrusive volcanism with the deposition of basaltic lava flows resulting from the Central Atlantic magmatic province and the opening of the central Atlantic Ocean

=== Parnaíba Unit (TS-3) ===
- Late Ordovician/Silurian to Early Triassic (deposition between ~445 and 220 million years ago)
- Interpreted as the product of basinal "sag" or cratonic basin subsidence
- Consists of three megasequences, separated by regional unconformities and comprising shallow marine, fluviolacustrine, and terrestrial siliciclastic sediments

Balsas megasequence

- Late Carboniferous to Middle Triassic (deposition between ~310 and 220 million years ago)
- Comprises the Piaui, Pedra de fogo, Motuca, and Sambaiba Formations
- Consists of clastic sandstone and evaporites deposited in subaerial environments

Caninde megaseqeuence

- Lower Devonian to Carboniferous (deposition between ~400 and 330 million years ago)
- Comprises the Itaim, Pimenteiras, Cabecas, Longa, and Poti Formations
- Consists of interbedded shallow marine and deltaic depositional environments

Serra Grande megasequence

- Early Silurian to Lower Devonian (deposition between ~440 and 405 million years ago)
- Comprises the Ipu, Tiangua, and Jaicos Formations
- Consists of quartz arenites of fluvioglacial, glacial marine, and shallow marine sediments that account for a complete transgressive/regressive cycle

=== Jaibaras Unit (TS-2) ===
- Cambrian (deposition between ~530 and 485 million years ago)
- Comprises the Jaibras Group, which is the Massapé, Pacujá, Parapuí and Aprazível Formations
- Interpreted as a rift infill resulting from a prevalent Cambro-Ordovician rifting event or pull-apart infill resulting from dextral strike-slip motion on the Transbrasiliano shear zone during the Cambrian/Early Ordovician

=== Riachão Unit (TS-1) ===
- Late Neoproterozoic to Cambrian (deposition between ~570 and 515 million years ago)
- Comprises the Riachão Package, which is Riachão I, II and III Sequences
- Interpreted as a Neoproterozoic rift, or a remnant foreland basin, bounded by thick skinned thrust faults of Cambro-Ordovician age

== Tectonic Evolution ==
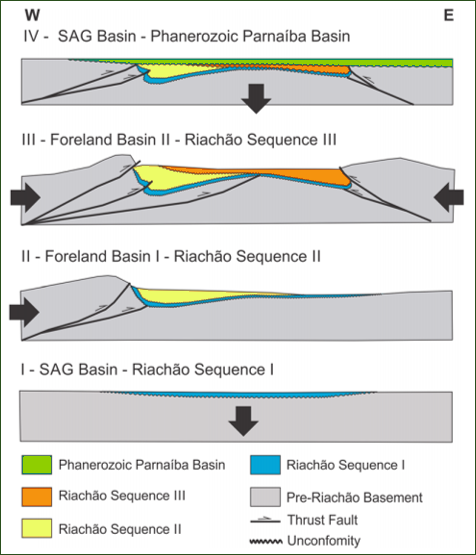
Schematic diagram of the tectonic evolution of the Riachão basin from the Late Neoproterozoic to the Paleozoic

The Parnaíba basin is located above a complex basement comprising several Archaean and Proterozoic terranes that stabilized during the Brasiliano orogeny. Seismic reflection data reveal a remnant basin beneath the major pre-Silurian unconformity and the base of the sediments of the Parnaíba cratonic basin. This pre-Silurian basin, known as the Riachão basin, covers an area of at least 35,000 km^{2} along a north–south trend. The remnant basin is thought to have originated as a foreland basin, and is poorly constrained between 574 and 500 million years ago.

=== The Riachão basin ===
The Riachão basin has sedimentation that reaches a thickness of 4 km at its maximum, and is composed of three seismostratigraphic sequences (Riachão I, II and III). These sequences are defined by onlaps and erosive unconformities.

The Riachão III sequence is a wedge-shaped package of low-amplitude continuous reflectors that onlap the top of the Riachão II sequence to the west. These clastic sediments were deposited in the second foreland phase to the east.

The Riachão II sequence is a wedge-shaped package of very low-amplitude discontinuous reflectors that onlap the top of the Riachão I sequence to the east. These sediments were deposited in the first foreland phase, centered in the west.

The Riachão I sequence is a thin, banded package of high-amplitude reflections that extend across most of the basin area and define a broad arch. This is interpreted as a carbonate marine platform sequence that took place before any foreland subsidence or clastic sediment input.

The Phanerozic Parnaíba basin sits on top of the remnant Riachão basin sequences, and shows no signs of deformation from thrust faulting. An intense erosional event took place after the deposition of the Riachão basin sequences that ultimately created a profound pre-Silurian unconformity. The subsidence and deposition of the Parnaíba basin sediments occurred after this event and have little to do with the previous development and deformation of the Riachão basin.

=== Modern Parnaíba basin ===
The current Parnaíba basin has maximum thickness of 3.5 km in its center, covers a Precambrian basin composed of Archean-Early Proterozoic cratonic blocks, consists of phanerozoic sediment, and is termed a cratonic sag basin. Low-to-moderate thermal subsidence caused the tectonostratigraphic units to become increasingly thicker in the central portion of the basin, which produces a saucer shape typical of cratonic sag basins. Tectonic subsidence curves through the Parnaíba Unit, done by backstripping data from 21 different wells, show an exponentially decreasing subsidence profile over 300 million years. Thermal time constraints of this subsidence range from 70 to 90 million years ago. The underlying subsidence appears largely continuous throughout the basin's history, though there are minor deviations associated with regional unconformities. These variations in subsidence can be interpreted as brief uplift events from epeirogenic movement caused by changing patterns of dynamic topography.

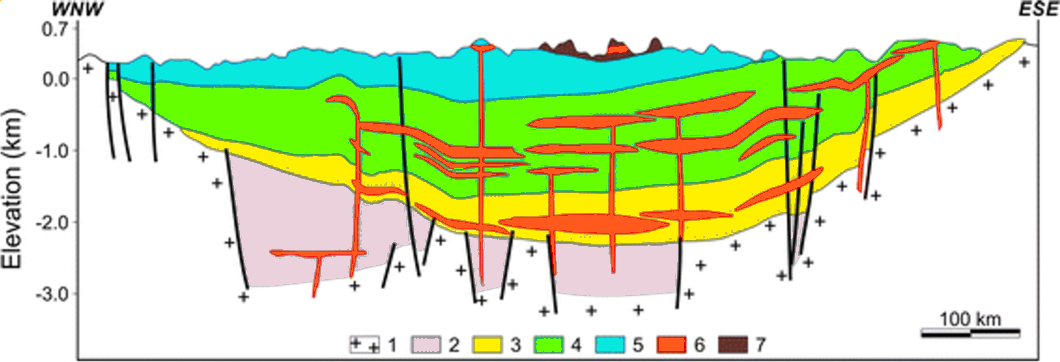
Schematic cross section of the Parnaíba Basin 1- Precambrian basement, 2- Pre-silurian rift sequence, 3- Silurian, 4- Devonian-Carboniferous, 5- Permian-Triassic, 6- Magmatic rocks (basalt/diabase), 7- Cenozoic to recent sedimentary cover
