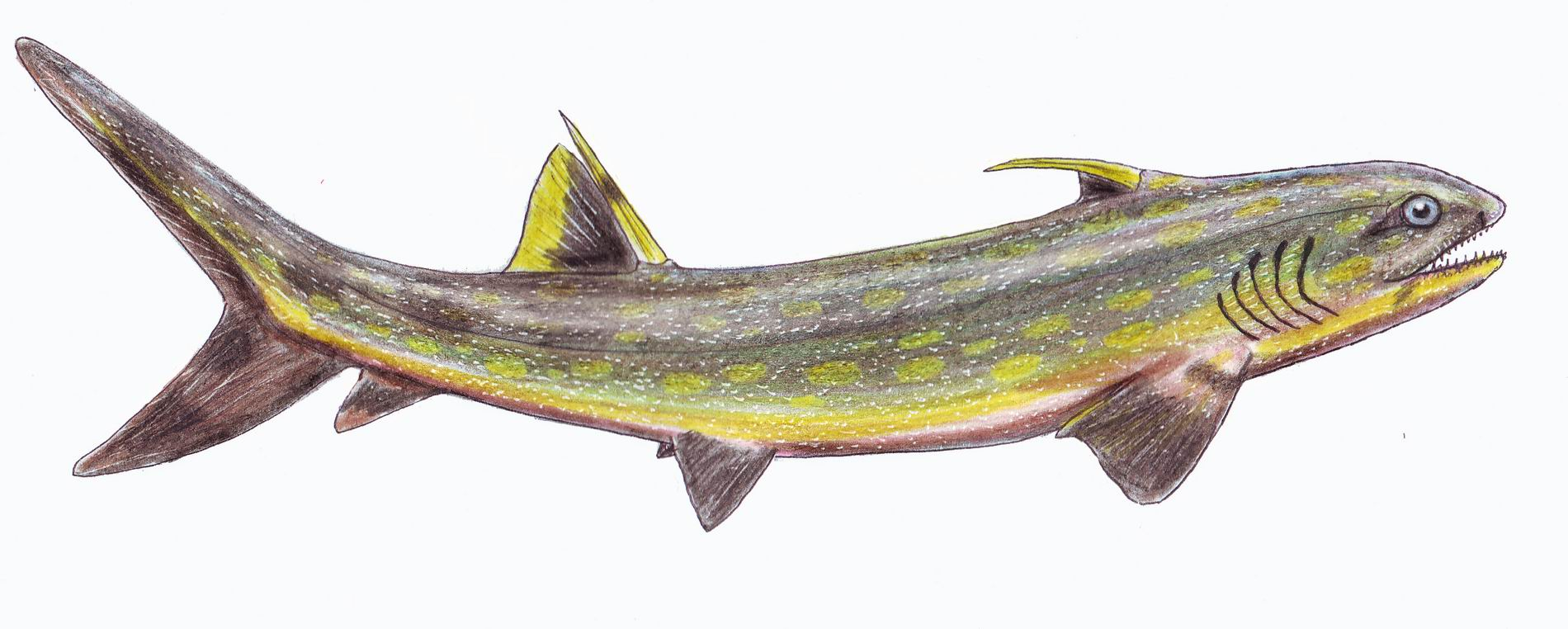

Scientific classification
- Kingdom: Animalia
- Phylum: Chordata
- Class: Chondrichthyes
- Family: †Sphenacanthidae
- Genus: †Sphenacanthus; Agassiz, 1837

Type species
- Sphenacanthus serrulatus Agazzis, 1837

Species
- Sphenacanthus aequistriatus Davis, 1879; Sphenacanthus carbonarius Giebel, 1848; Sphenacanthus costellatus Traquair, 1884; Sphenacanthus gondwanus Silva Santos, 1947; Sphenacanthus hybodioides; Sphenacanthus hybodoides; Sphenacanthus hybodoides Newberry, 1873; Sphenacanthus ignis Figueroa & Gallo, 2017; Sphenacanthus maranhensis Silva Santos, 1946; Sphenacanthus marshi Newberry, 1873; Sphenacanthus riorastoensis Pauliv et al., 2012; Sphenacanthus sanpauloensis Chahud et al., 2010; Sphenacanthus serrulatus Agassiz, 1837

= Sphenacanthus =

Sphenacanthus Temporal range: Late Devonian-Late Permian

Extinct genus of cartilaginous fishes

Sphenacanthus (from Greek: σφήν sphḗn, 'wedge' and Greek: ἄκανθα akantha, 'spine') is an extinct genus of a chondrichtyan xenacanthiform that belongs to the Sphenacanthidae family and lived from the Late Devonian, through Carboniferous until the Late Permian period in Scotland, Spain, Russia and Brazil. It lived 359 million years ago, and probably it was one of the first member of the elasmobranchians, the lineage that leads to the modern sharks. Sphenacanthus probably hunted small fishes and, unlike their modern-day relatives, it inhabited fresh water lagoons. Sphenacanthus had seven fins, two in the upper part and five in the underside, and it had a heterodont dentition and mandibles relatively long and deeper. Sphenacanthus serrulatus is still only known from incomplete neurocranial remains and associated dermal material. These suggest that it was a relatively large shark, probably well over one meter in length when fully grown. Its body form was probably similar to that of other phalacanthous sharks.

== Paleobiology ==
Sphenacanthus was discovered in Carboniferous terrains of Scotland (Visén Oil Shale Groups), in the United Kingdom, in ancient fresh water systems, a habitat that also is known in the Paraná Basin in Brazil (Rio do Rasto Formation). Another findings, like those of the Puertollano Bason in Spain suggests that also it lived in zones of marine influence, in brackish waters. It shared its environment with other primitive sharks, including to Xenacanthus of one meter in length and the similar species, Tristychius arcuatus. It is possible that Sphenacanthus may have preyed on its smaller relatives.
